= Republic station =

Former train station in New York, US

Republic
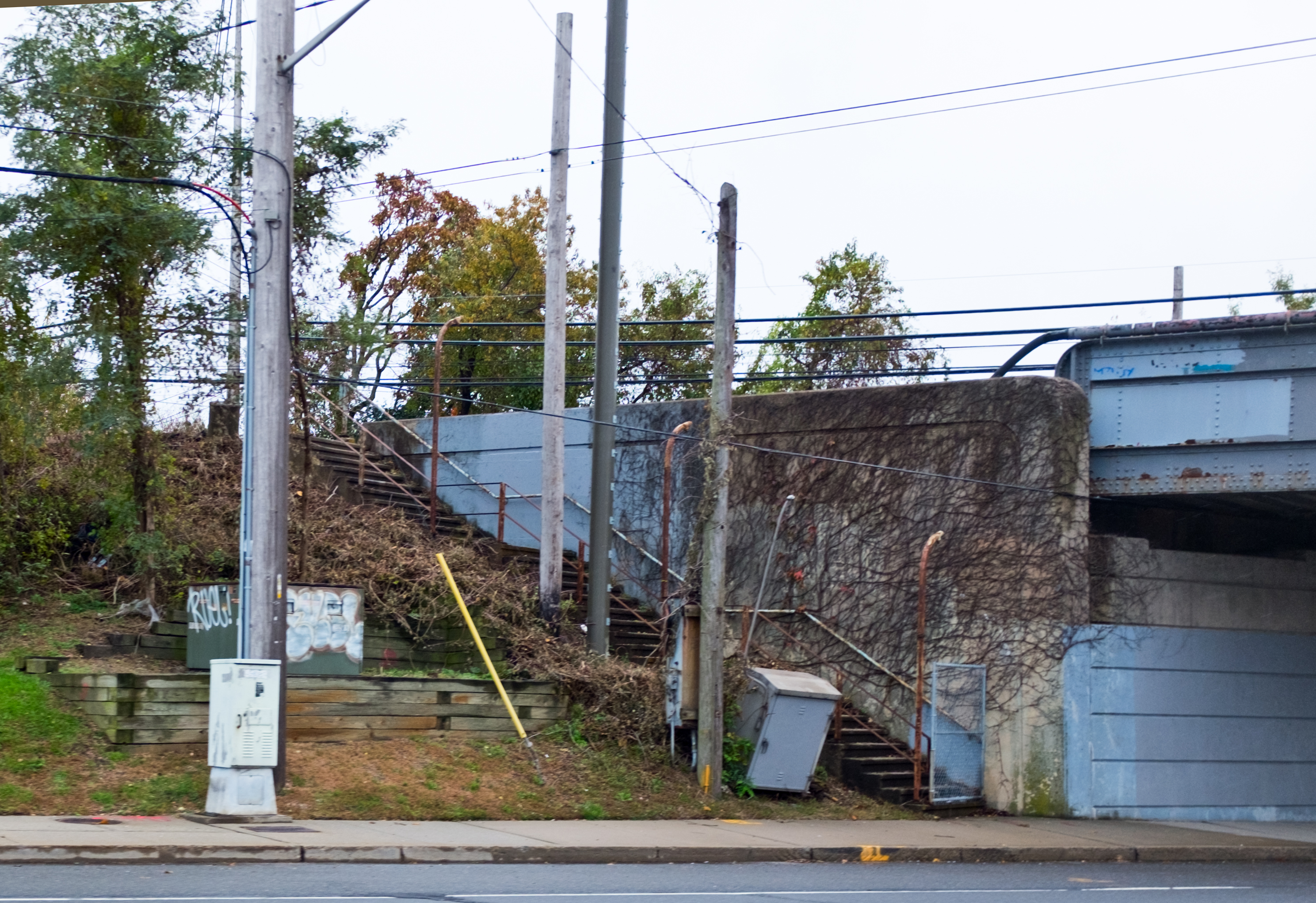
- Remains of the staircase to the former Republic station

General information
- Location: Broad Hollow Road and Conklin Street; East Farmingdale, New York
- Coordinates: 40.740278°N 73.421944°W
- Owner: Long Island Rail Road
- Line: Main Line
- Platforms: 2 side platform
- Tracks: 2

Other information
- Station code: None

History
- Opened: December 9, 1940
- Closed: 1986 or 1987

Former services
Preceding station	Long Island Rail Road	Following station
Farmingdale toward Penn Station or Grand Central	Ronkonkoma Branch	Pinelawn toward Ronkonkoma
Preceding station	Long Island Rail Road	Following station
Farmingdale toward Long Island City or Penn Station	Main Line	Pinelawn toward Greenport
Location

Republic was a station stop along the Ronkonkoma Branch which served employees of the Fairchild Engine & Airplane Manufacturing Company and the nearby Republic Airport from 1940 to the late 1980s. As part of a double-tracking project on the line, the station may be reopened.

== History ==
=== Original station ===
Republic station opened on December 9, 1940, with simple wooden shelters for passengers. When electrification was extended from Hicksville to Ronkonkoma in the 1980s, the LIRR proposed to close the stops at Republic, Grumman, Pineaire, Brentwood, and Deer Park to speed travel times and to avoid the cost of building high level platforms at lightly used stations. The latter two were ultimately kept, but Republic closed in either 1986 or 1987 due to its low ridership and the high cost of new platforms. The old station platforms have been removed, but the two staircases down to Route 110 remain, though gated off.

=== Proposed reopening ===
As part of the project that added a second track from Farmingdale to Ronkonkoma, the MTA is considering reopening Republic station. The reopened station would serve the State Route 110 corridor, a major north–south commercial route. The station was cut from the project in 2010 due to budgetary issues, but revived in 2012. The MTA Board included money for planning and engineering in the approved 2015-2019 Capital Plan, and anticipates funding construction through a future Capital Plan.
