= Central Islip station =

Long Island Rail Road station in Suffolk County, New York

Central Islip
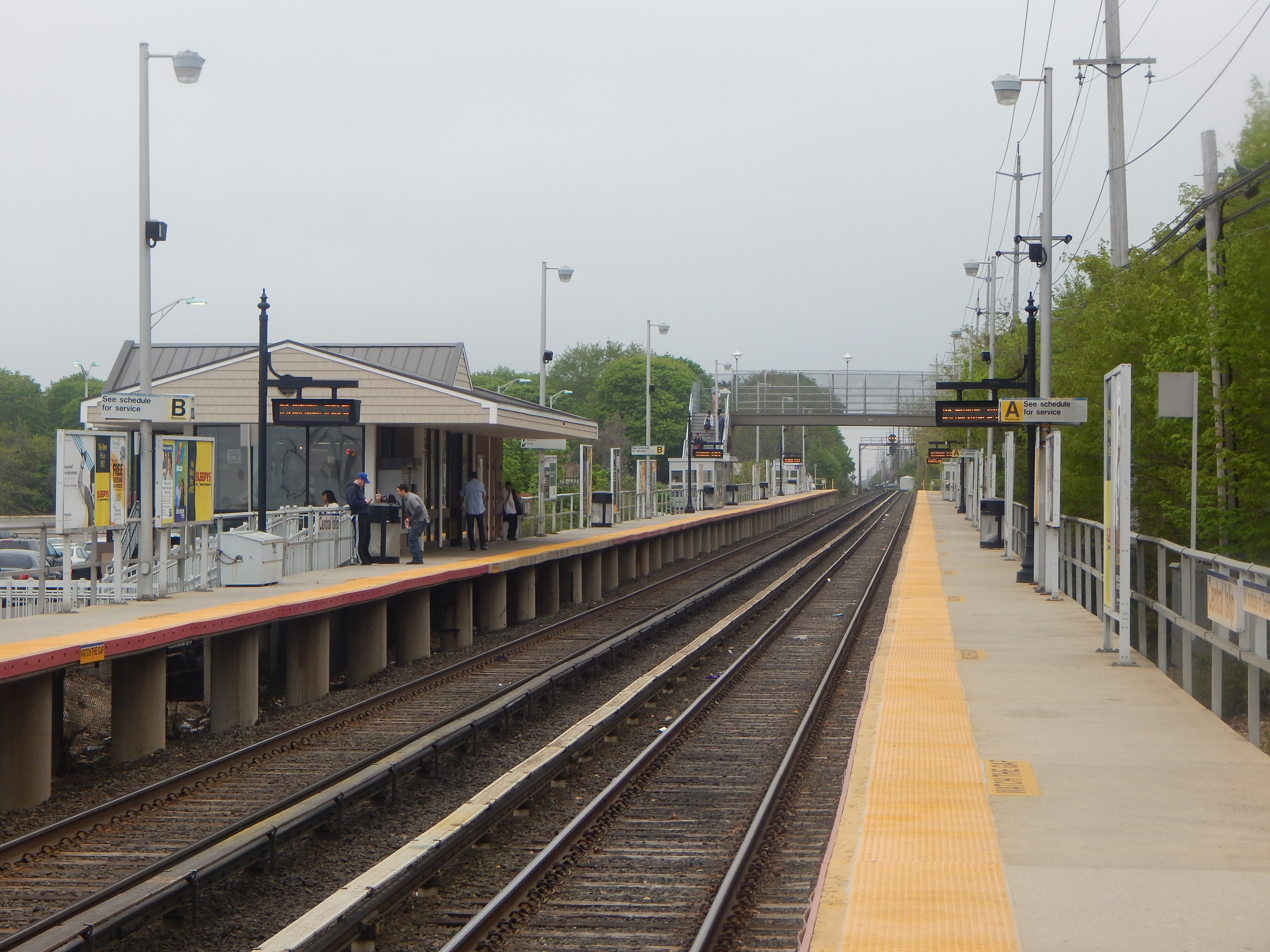
- The Central Islip station in 2015

General information
- Location: Suffolk Avenue & Lowell Avenue; Central Islip, New York
- Coordinates: 40.79188°N 73.19467°W
- Owner: Long Island Rail Road
- Line: Main Line
- Distance: 43.6 mi (70.2 km) from Long Island City
- Platforms: 2 side platforms
- Tracks: 2
- Connections: Suffolk County Transit: 4, 6, 17, 52A, 52B (52B weekdays only)

Construction
- Parking: Yes
- Cycle facilities: Yes; Bike racks and lockers
- Accessible: Yes

Other information
- Station code: CI
- Fare zone: 10

History
- Opened: November 4, 1873
- Electrified: January 18, 1988; 750 V (DC) third rail

Passengers
- 2012—2014: 3,627 per weekday

Services
Preceding station	Long Island Rail Road	Following station
Brentwood toward Penn Station or Grand Central	Ronkonkoma Branch	Ronkonkoma Terminus
Former services
Preceding station	Long Island Rail Road	Following station
Brentwood toward Long Island City or Penn Station	Main Line	Ronkonkoma toward Greenport
Location

Central Islip is a station on the Main Line (Ronkonkoma Branch) of the Long Island Rail Road. It is at the southwest corner of Suffolk Avenue (CR 100) and Lowell Avenue in Central Islip, New York. Short-term parking is also available on Suffolk CR 100 across from the intersections between Pineville and Hawthorne Avenues.

== History ==
=== Suffolk station ===
Prior to the opening of the Central Islip station, the LIRR opened Suffolk in the present border between Brentwood and Central Islip on July 14, 1842 on the south side of the track and on the west side of Islip Avenue (also NY 111 and Fifth Avenue). A post office was opened on June 15, 1857, and continued to operate there until January 7, 1874 when it was transferred to Central Islip. This site was selected by President Fisk of the Long Island Rail Road as the most eligible site for a depot, car house, engine house and well, as long as the land on the north and south sides of the track were handed over. The owner on the north side complied, but the owner on the south side refused, so the idea fell flat. This site was on the main and most travelled route between the Town of Smithtown and Islip. This station was closed as it was replaced by the Central Islip depot that was built further east and opened on November 4, 1873 as a flag stop. A team track and a freight spur were located on the northeast and southwest corners of the railroad crossing near the original station site until 1959, the southwest spur having been used by the Long Island Lighting Company.

=== Moving to Central Islip ===
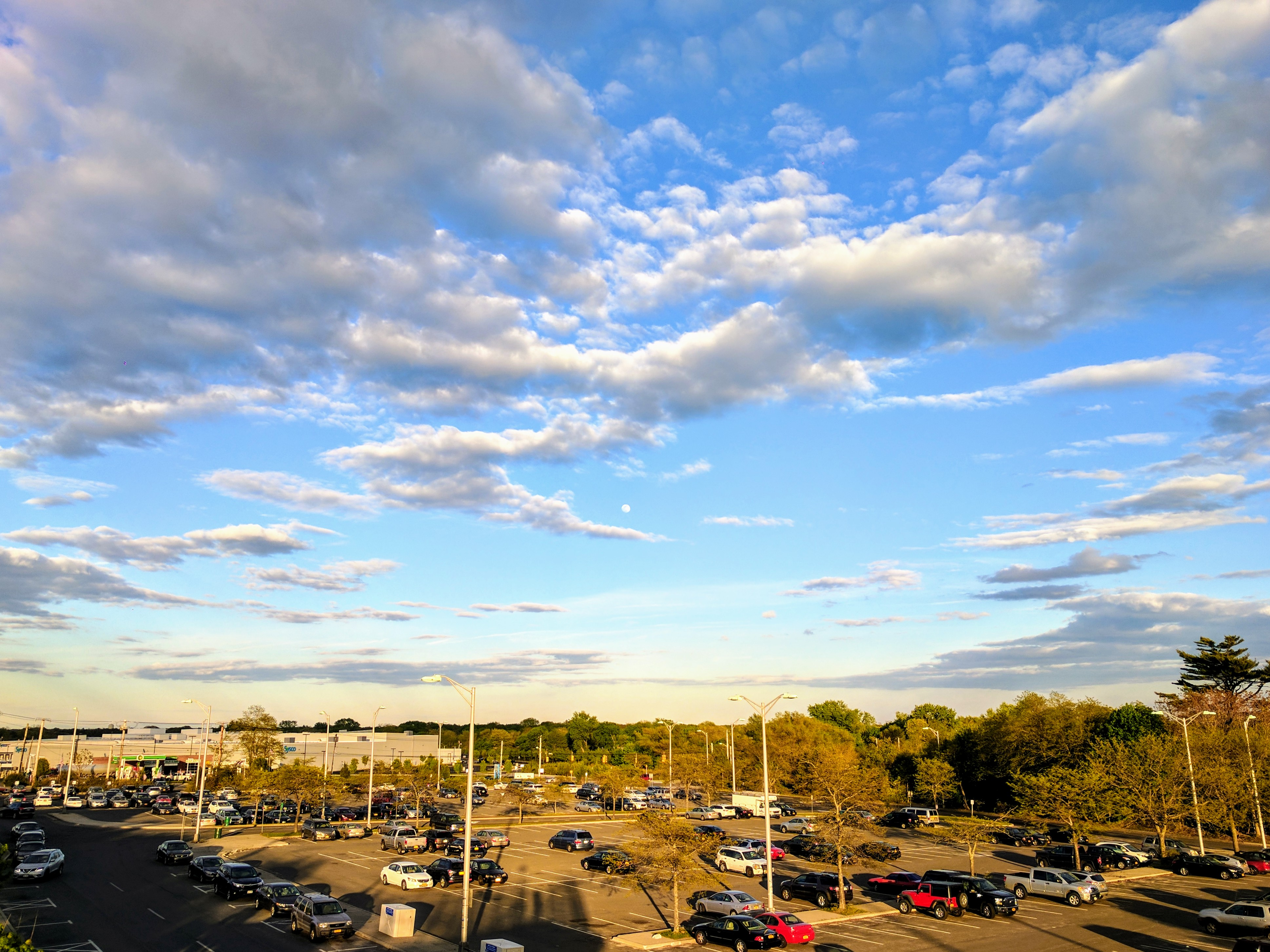
View of the station parking lot from the footbridge on May 8, 2017.

Central Islip station was built between August and October 1873 and opened on November 4, 1873, on the southeast corner of Suffolk County Roads 17 & 100 as a replacement for the former July 14, 1842-built Suffolk station on Islip Avenue (now NY 111, then Fifth Avenue). The condition for getting the depot was that the people had to donate all the land that was needed in addition to $600. The land was deeded over on June 14, 1873 and the $600 paid by July 1, 1873. It was remodeled in 1916 and the original depot was razed in August 1958. On November 16, 1987, it was moved to the corner of Lowell Avenue as part of a major reconstruction of the line in Ronkonkoma, Central Islip, Brentwood, Deer Park, and Wyandanch. The station was built on the site of a former spur to the Central Islip Psychiatric Center, including the hospital's power plant that was abandoned years before the hospital was closed. Across Lowell Avenue is the site of a Waldbaum's warehouse that once had a freight spur leading to it. The site of the 1958-built station was used as an MTA Police station until that was moved to a larger facility across Suffolk CR 17.

=== Central Islip Hospital station ===
Central Islip State Hospital originally had two railroad spurs from the team track east of the former site of Central Islip station, although not necessarily used simultaneously. One which ran along what is today Audwin Road and curved southwest through Carleton Avenue and South Research Place was for passengers, patients, and visitors, and the other along Lowell Avenue was for freight, which by 1950 was used fuel the power plant at the station, and a state-run warehouse. The switching locomotives contained markings exclusively for the hospital, rather than the LIRR.

With medication, de-institutionalization, and social reforms that reduced the criteria for committing people, the use of rail service at the hospital was gradually reduced. The station house was moved from the Audwin Road spur to the Lowell Road Spur, around 1966. Passenger service was eliminated by 1971, and rail service was reduced to freight only. The Lowell Avenue spur was neglected through the years until it was finally demolished before the station was moved from Carleton Avenue in 1987.

== Station layout ==
The station has two high-level side platforms, each 12 cars long. Prior to substantial completion of the Main Line Double Track Project in mid-2018, trains mainly served Platform B in both directions.
