= Central Islip Recreation Center =

Coordinates: 40°47′16″N 73°11′36″W

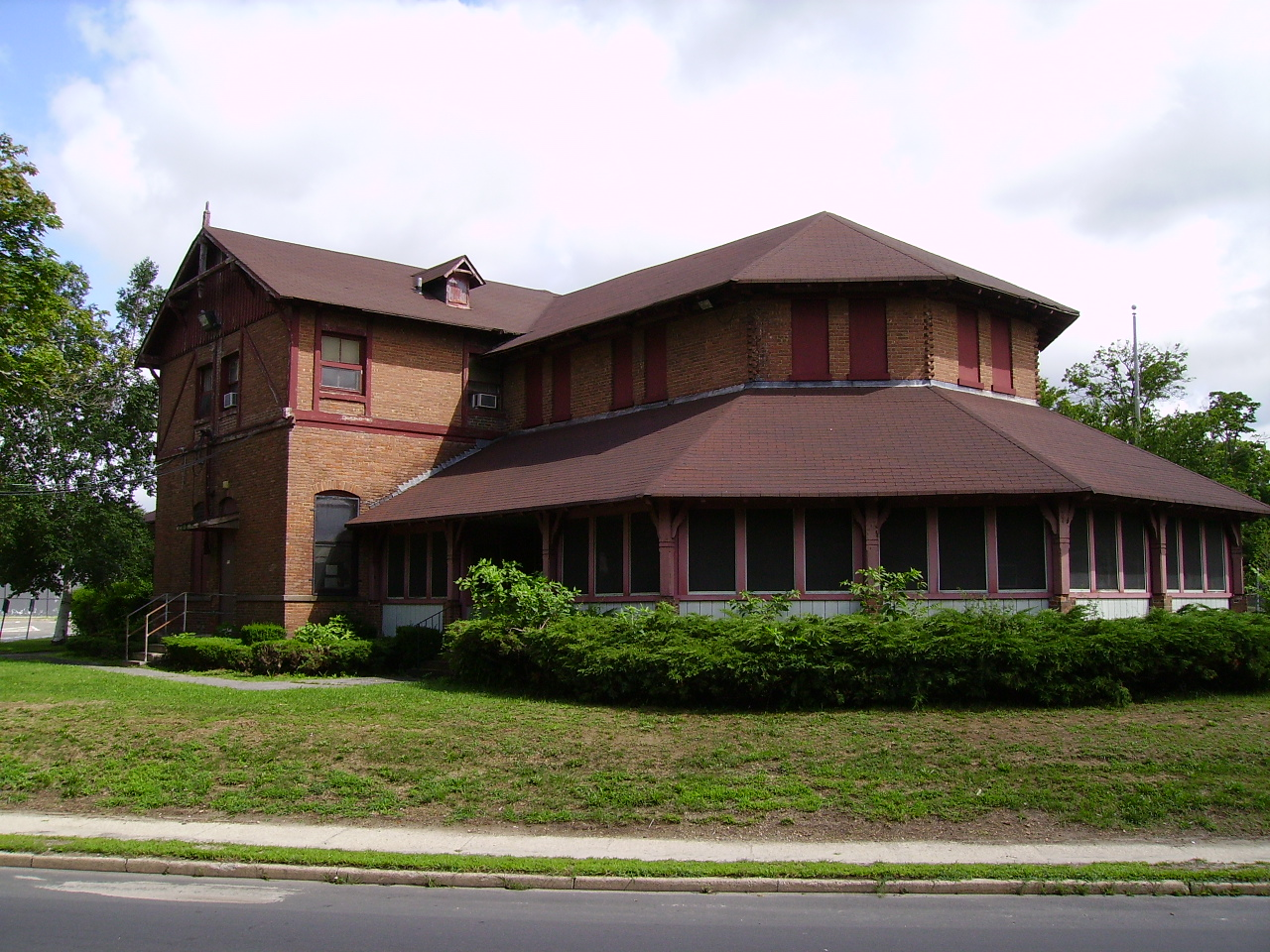
One of five buildings of the C.I. Rec Center

Historic Central Islip Recreation Center Building, located on 555 Clayton Street in Central Islip, New York, was constructed in the late 19th century as part of the Central Islip State Hospital First Colony.

== See also ==
- Central Islip State Hospital Powerplant.
