= Wyandanch station =

Long Island Rail Road station in Suffolk County, New York

Wyandanch
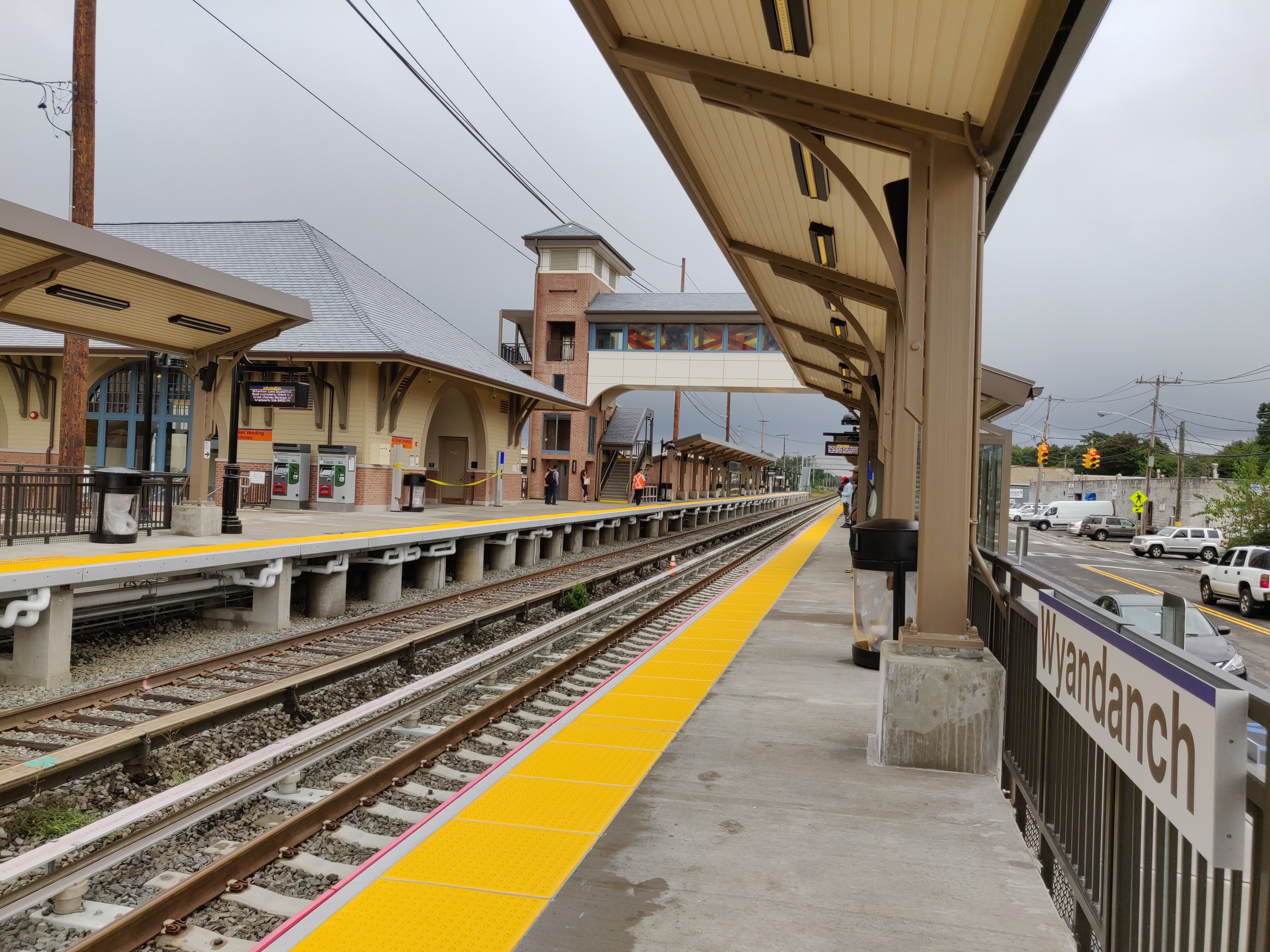
- Wyandanch station, focused eastward on platform "B" in September 2018

General information
- Location: Straight Path & Long Island Avenue, off Acorn Avenue; Wyandanch, New York
- Coordinates: 40.754889°N 73.35781°W
- Owner: Long Island Rail Road
- Line: Main Line
- Distance: 34.7 mi (55.8 km) from Long Island City
- Platforms: 2 side platforms
- Tracks: 2
- Connections: Suffolk County Transit: 3, 4, 12

Construction
- Parking: Yes; Free
- Cycle facilities: Yes
- Accessible: Yes
- Architect: Urbahn Architects

Other information
- Station code: WYD
- Fare zone: 9

History
- Opened: May 1875
- Rebuilt: 1958, 1987, 2018
- Electrified: January 18, 1988; 750 V (DC) third rail
- Former names: West Deer Park

Passengers
- 2012–2014: 4,217 per weekday

Services
Preceding station	Long Island Rail Road	Following station
Farmingdale toward Penn Station or Grand Central	Ronkonkoma Branch	Deer Park toward Ronkonkoma
Pinelawn limited service toward Penn Station or Grand Central	Ronkonkoma Branch	Deer Park toward Ronkonkoma
Former services
Preceding station	Long Island Rail Road	Following station
Pinelawn toward Long Island City or Penn Station	Main Line	Deer Park toward Greenport
Location

Wyandanch is a station along the Main Line (Ronkonkoma Branch) of the Long Island Rail Road. It is located on Straight Path (CR 2) and Long Island Avenue, off Acorn Avenue, in Wyandanch, New York, United States. All parking near the station is free, and maintained by either Suffolk County or the Town of Babylon.

== History ==
Wyandanch station was originally built in May 1875 as "West Deer Park." The station and tracks have always been at ground level. During the 1920s and 1930s, the vicinity of the station became the site of numerous accidents involving crashes with trains at the unguarded grade-level rail crossings at Straight Path, 18th Street and Little East Neck Road. In 1935, after repeated protests from the people of Wyandanch, the New York Public Service Commission (PSC) ordered the LIRR to provide crossing guards at the 18th Street and Straight Path grade crossings during school hours on school days, so to ensure that school children living north of the LIRR could safely walk across the railroad on their way to the schoolhouse at South 20th Street and Straight Path on the south side of the tracks.

In December 1948, a model railroading club called the New York Live Steamer Society built a miniature steam railroad ride along the line at Merritt Avenue at North 17th Street, on a plot of land which was owned by the LIRR. No fees were ever charged, and the rides proved to be quite popular. By 1951, three miniature engines were in operation on Sundays and holidays, "two of them steam and the other diesel." The miniature railway moved to Freeport in 1953, when the LIRR needed the land on which the New York Live Steamer Society had been using without charge.

The station was razed in February 1958. It was replaced with a non-descript, flat-roofed, 37' x 12', $40,000 concrete block depot on the north side of Long Island Avenue about 500 feet (150 m) west of the 1875 station. The relocated station was built in June 1958 and was similar to the current Bethpage station house.

As part of its reconstruction, the LIRR leased 50,600 square feet (4,700 m^{2}) of property on both sides of the track between Straight Path and 18th Street for expanded parking and also lengthened the platform at Wyandanch from 300 feet (90 m) to 898 feet (274 m), in order to accommodate longer trains. However, parking at Wyandanch station became problematic in the 1960s with the development of upscale housing in Half Hollow Hills. These upper middle class commuters boarded at Wyandanch since it was closer than the Huntington station in the eponymous community.

In early 1983, the MTA announced that it was planning to electrify the Main Line from Hicksville to Ronkonkoma. As part of an attempt to speed commuting times through Suffolk County, they wanted to eliminate railroad service in Wyandanch after 108 years. Similar proposals were considered for Pinelawn and Brentwood stations. The LIRR believed moving the Deer Park station to Pineaire and eliminating the Wyandanch and Pinelawn stations would allow the faster electric trains to significantly reduce commuting times to Penn Station. The closing of the Wyandanch station would have meant that all LIRR trains would have sped through Wyandanch at speeds of up to 90 mph. This angered and united disparate groups in Wyandanch, prompting civic groups to mobilize residents to protest any termination of railroad service in Wyandanch. Working on a bipartisan basis, Senator Owen Johnson (R-West Babylon) and Assemblyman Patrick Halpin (D-Lindenhurst) convinced the MTA to maintain rail service in Wyandanch as well as Pinelawn. The LIRR agreed to add a fence along the tracks to prevent residents from crossing the tracks and touching the third rail, and built two steel crossover bridges at South 27th Street and at Deer Street, just east of the new station.

The 1958 station was razed, and in 1987, a new station was built, along with new Ronkonkoma, Central Islip, Brentwood, and Deer Park stations. The new $667,000, unstaffed Wyandanch station was erected by Slattery Associates (Farmingdale) on the site of the original 1875 Wyandanch station at Straight Path and Acorn Street. The new station was larger than the 1958 structure it replaced. Of the five stations within the 1987 reconstruction project, Wyandanch station was moved closest to its previous location, specifically the original site of "West Deer Park" station. The LIRR started electric rail service in Wyandanch on January 18, 1988.

On July 13, 2013, the LIRR and state and local elected officials broke ground on "Wyandanch Rising," a 40-acre transit-oriented development project that is to create an intermodal facility at the station, including a parking facility for 900 cars and a new station building; an apartment and retail complex is under construction. The expanded LIRR station is also intended to support the increased ridership anticipated when LIRR trains begin serving Grand Central station in 2018 (see East Side Access).

As part of the Double Tracking Project completed in 2018, the LIRR constructed two new platforms and installed a snow melt system, a new pedestrian overpass with elevators to provide ADA-compliance, new canopies, new platform shelter, and add platform amenities such as help points and complimentary WiFi. The rebuilt station was designed by Urbahn Architects.

== Station layout ==
This station has two 12-car long side platforms.

== Image gallery ==
Wyandanch station

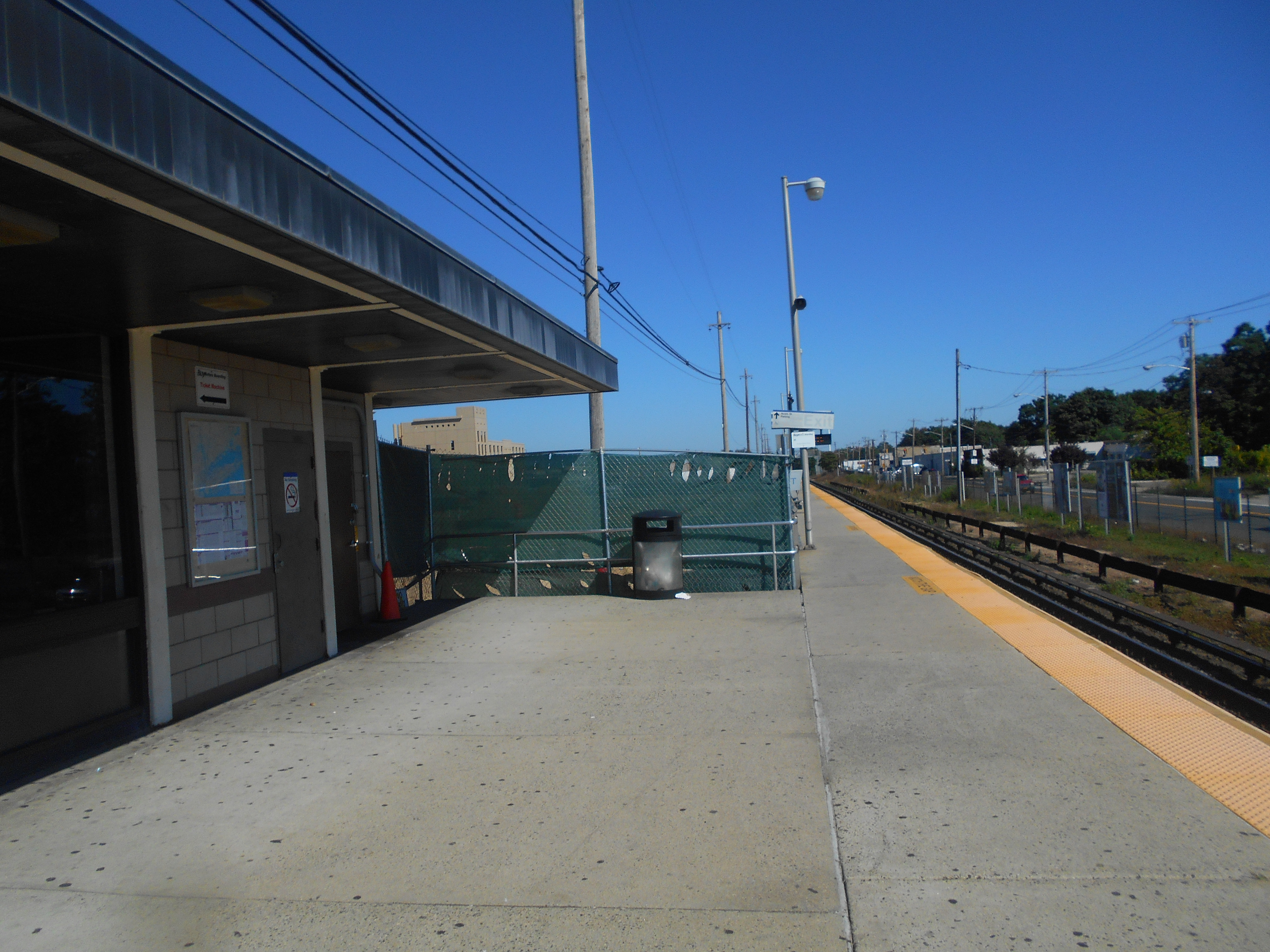
Wyandanch station, focused eastward on the old platform in September 2014, prior to the Double Track Project.

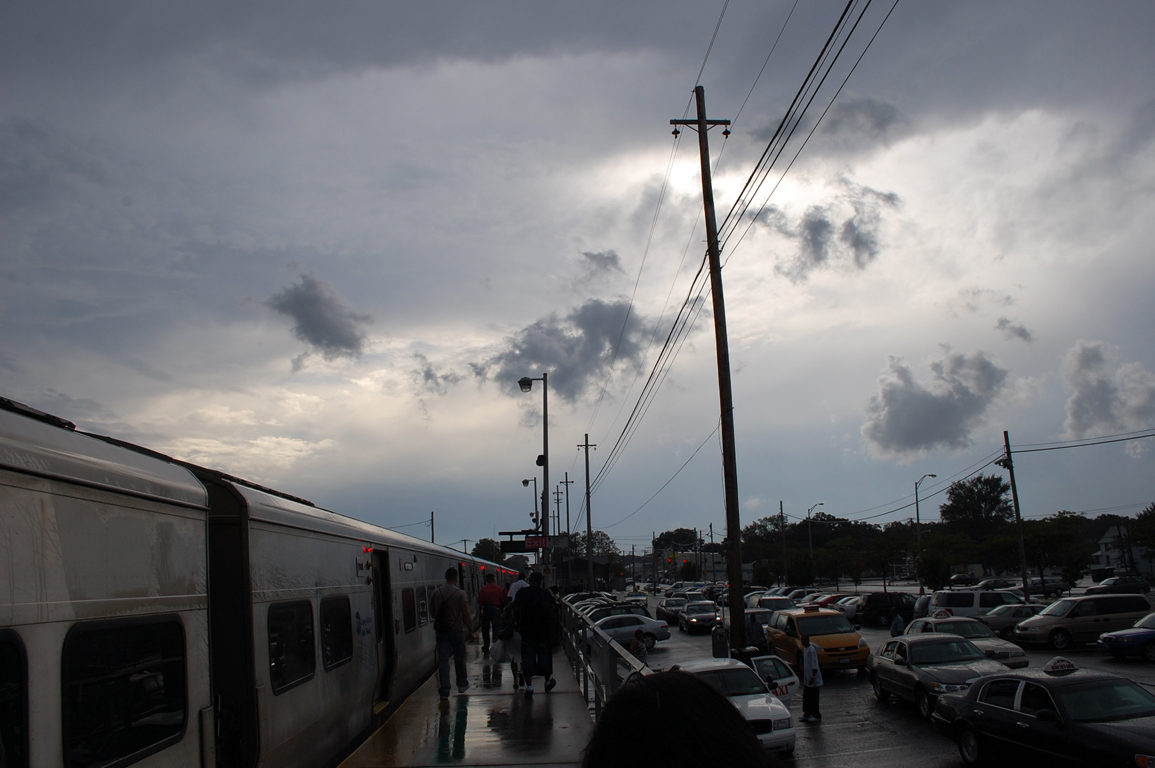
A train stopped at Wyandanch, prior to the Double Track Project.

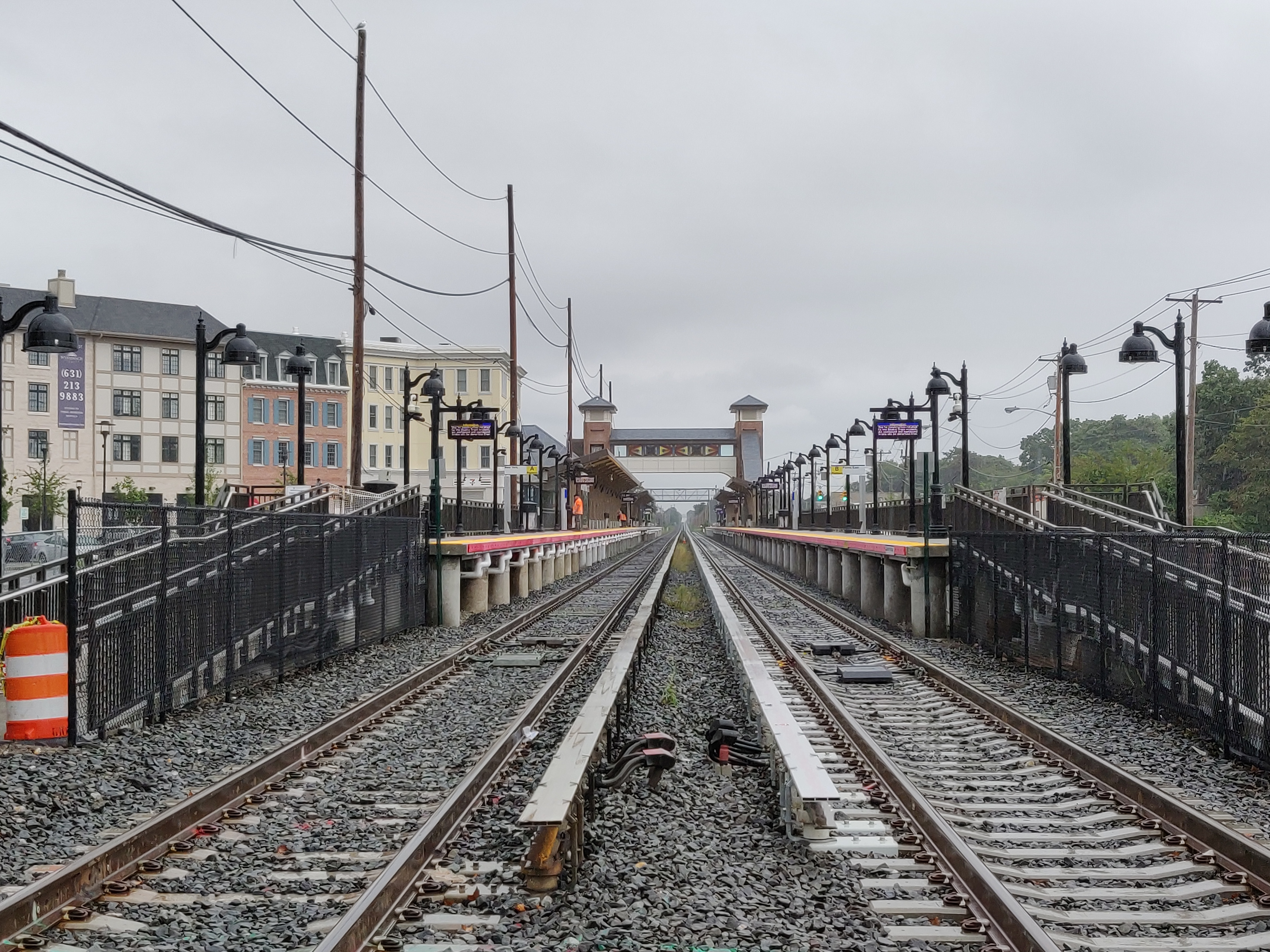
Both tracks as seen from the Straight Path grade crossing in September 2018.

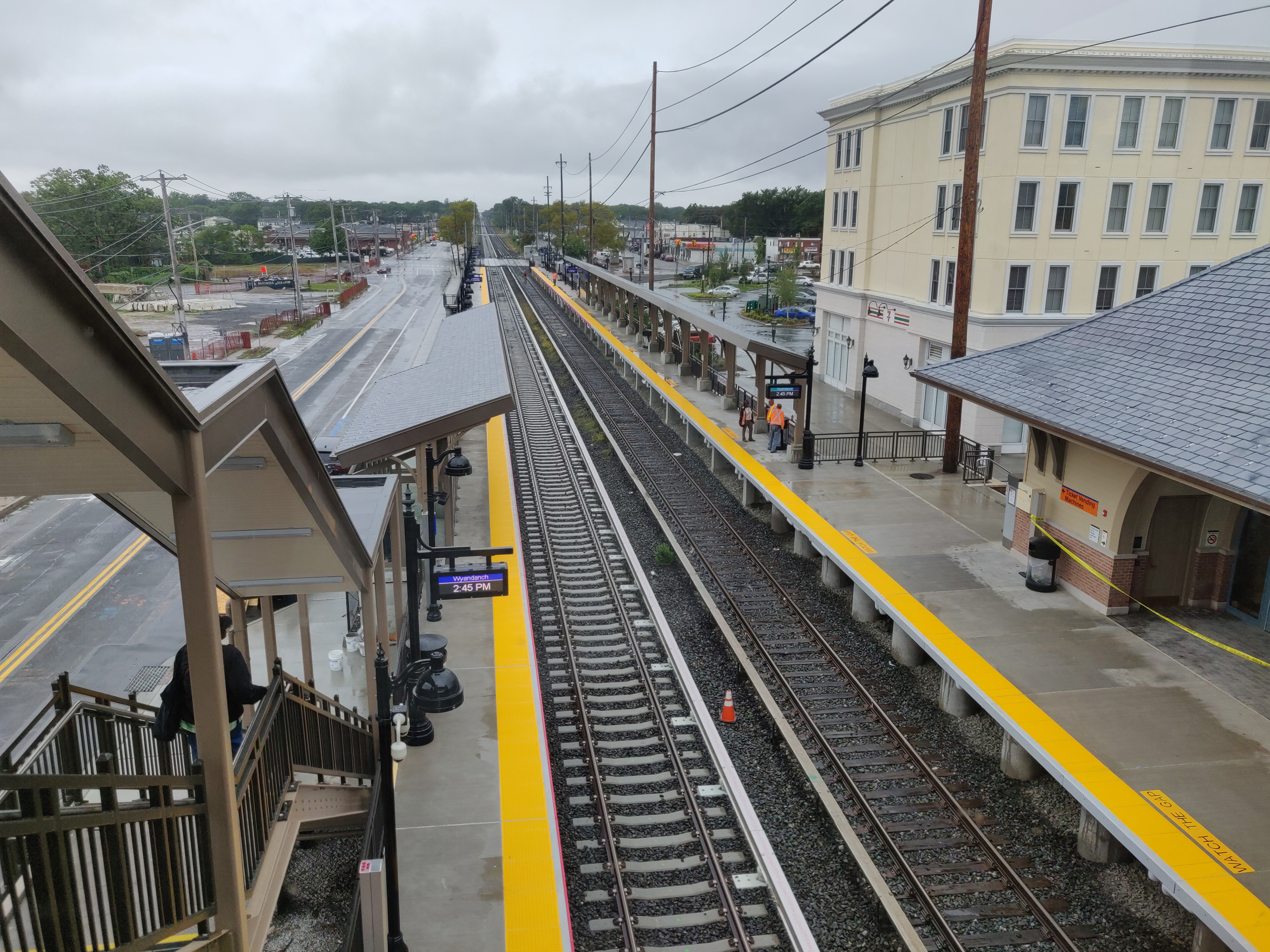
The view from the wheelchair accessible overpass, facing west in September 2018.

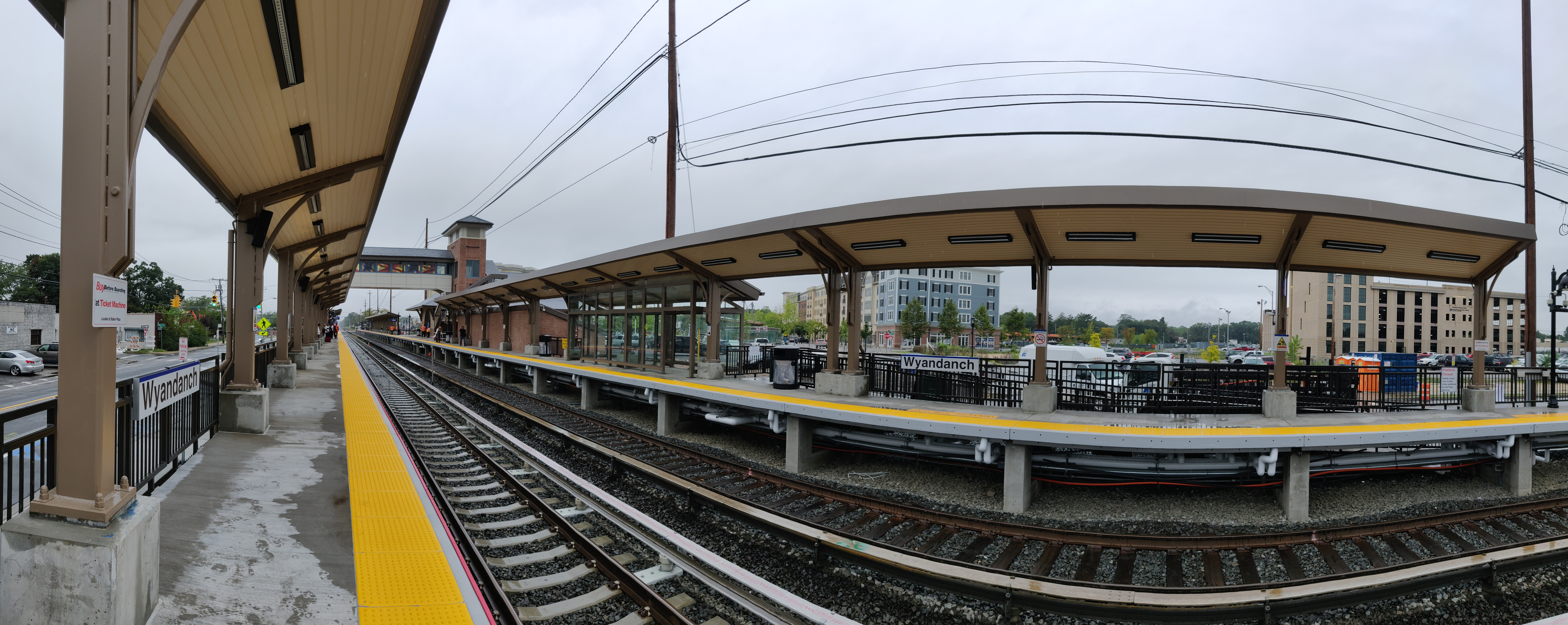
Panoramic Photo of the platforms facing west in September 2018.
