= Pinelawn station =

Long Island Rail Road station in East Farmingdale, Suffolk County, New York

Pinelawn
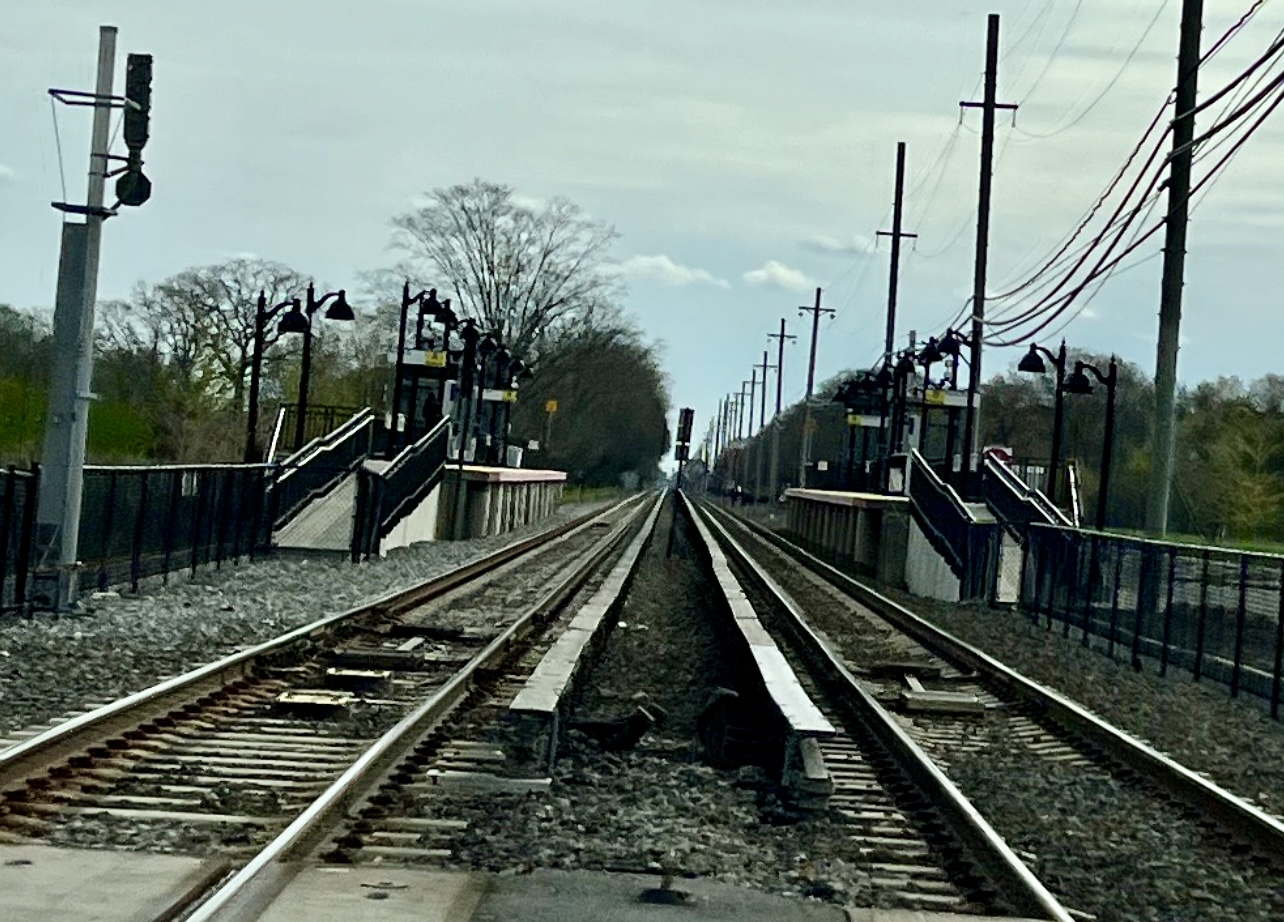
- The station, as seen from the Wellwood Avenue grade crossing, in 2024

General information
- Location: Wellwood Avenue (County Route 3) and Long Island Avenue; East Farmingdale, New York
- Coordinates: 40.745339°N 73.399572°W
- Owner: Long Island Rail Road
- Line: Main Line
- Distance: 32.4 mi (52.1 km) from Long Island City
- Platforms: 2 side platforms
- Tracks: 2

Construction
- Parking: Yes; Free
- Accessible: Yes

Other information
- Station code: PLN
- Fare zone: 9

History
- Opened: 1895
- Rebuilt: 1915, 1925, 1979, 2018
- Electrified: 1987; 750 V (DC) third rail
- Former names: Melville (1895–1897); Pinelawn (Melville) (1897–1899)

Passengers
- 2012—2014: 36 per weekday

Services
Preceding station	Long Island Rail Road	Following station
Farmingdale toward Penn Station or Grand Central	Ronkonkoma Branch limited service	Wyandanch toward Ronkonkoma
Former services
Preceding station	Long Island Rail Road	Following station
Republic toward Long Island City or Penn Station	Main Line	Wyandanch toward Greenport
Location

Pinelawn is a railroad station along the Main Line (Ronkonkoma Branch) of the Long Island Rail Road. It is located on Long Island Avenue, just east of the Wellwood Avenue (CR 3) grade crossing in East Farmingdale, New York.

The Pinelawn station primarily serves off-peak local trains on the Ronkonkoma Branch. Approximately 36 trains currently stop at the station every week. As of 2024, the station sees no service during late nights or peak hours.

== History ==
The Pinelawn station originally had two different station houses with their own histories. Both were created to serve Pinelawn Cemetery, Wellwood Cemetery, and other cemeteries in the vicinity. The first station opened as a flag stop on the northeast corner of Wellwood Avenue in 1895 as Melville, a name it maintained until 1897. From there it would be named Pinelawn (Melville) and finally Pinelawn in 1899.

The second station was built in 1915, and moved to the southeast side of Wellwood Avenue in 1925. It was remodeled again in June 1979, but only as a shelter. Despite nearly being eliminated as part of the Long Island Rail Road's electrification of the main line towards Ronkonkoma, the Pinelawn station – along with the Wyandanch and Brentwood stations – was saved as part of a bipartisan effort by New York State Senator Owen H. Johnson (R–West Babylon) and Assemblyman Patrick G. Halpin (D–Lindenhurst), and given a high-level platform in 1986.

In the late 2010s, as part of the Main Line Second Track Project, which built a second track between Farmingdale and Ronkonkoma, two new platforms were constructed at the Pinelawn station. The existing station building and platform were demolished, allowing construction of a second track and platform. Long Island Avenue was also shifted slightly south, with the road's old alignment becoming a parking lot for the station with a drop-off area.

On April 17, 2025, a westbound commuter train collided with a vehicle at the Wellwood Avenue crossing just outside the station, causing a fire that engulfed the vehicle and the front of the train. The driver of the car was killed and the first car of the train, M9 #9157, was severely damaged.

== Station layout ==
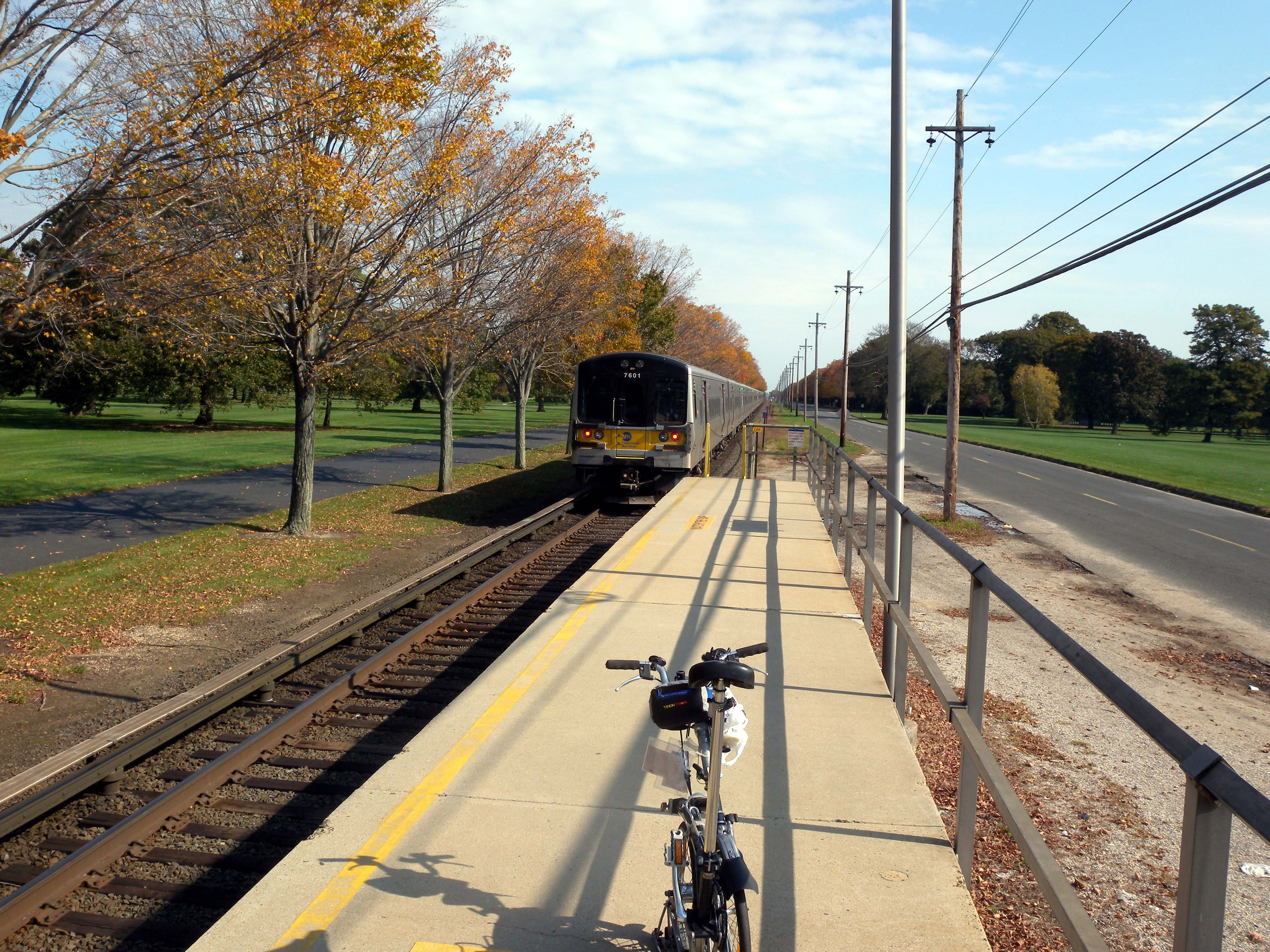
A Ronkonkoma-bound M7 departing the station, with its old layout.

This station has two tracks and two 2-car-long side platforms. South of Platform B is a small drop off area with six parking spaces.

Platform A, side platform
Track 1	← Ronkonkoma Branch limited service toward Grand Central Madison or Penn Station (Farmingdale)
Track 2	Ronkonkoma Branch limited service toward Ronkonkoma (Wyandanch) →
Platform B, side platform

== Pinelawn Cemetery station ==
Despite the presence of the shack-sized station, a much more elaborate station was built across Wellwood Avenue on August 30, 1904. The station had a tall clock tower, a cemetery office, a chapel, and a fancy ticket office in the main lobby, however it is widely believed never to have been used by the public. Pinelawn Cemetery station remained in service for a business located within the cemetery, until it was destroyed by a fire in April 1928. The walls of the station were still standing in 1960, and the arched entrance to this station remained intact until 1985, when the Long Island Rail Road was beginning its electrification of the Main Line.
