= Farmingdale station =

Long Island Rail Road station in Nassau County, New York

Farmingdale
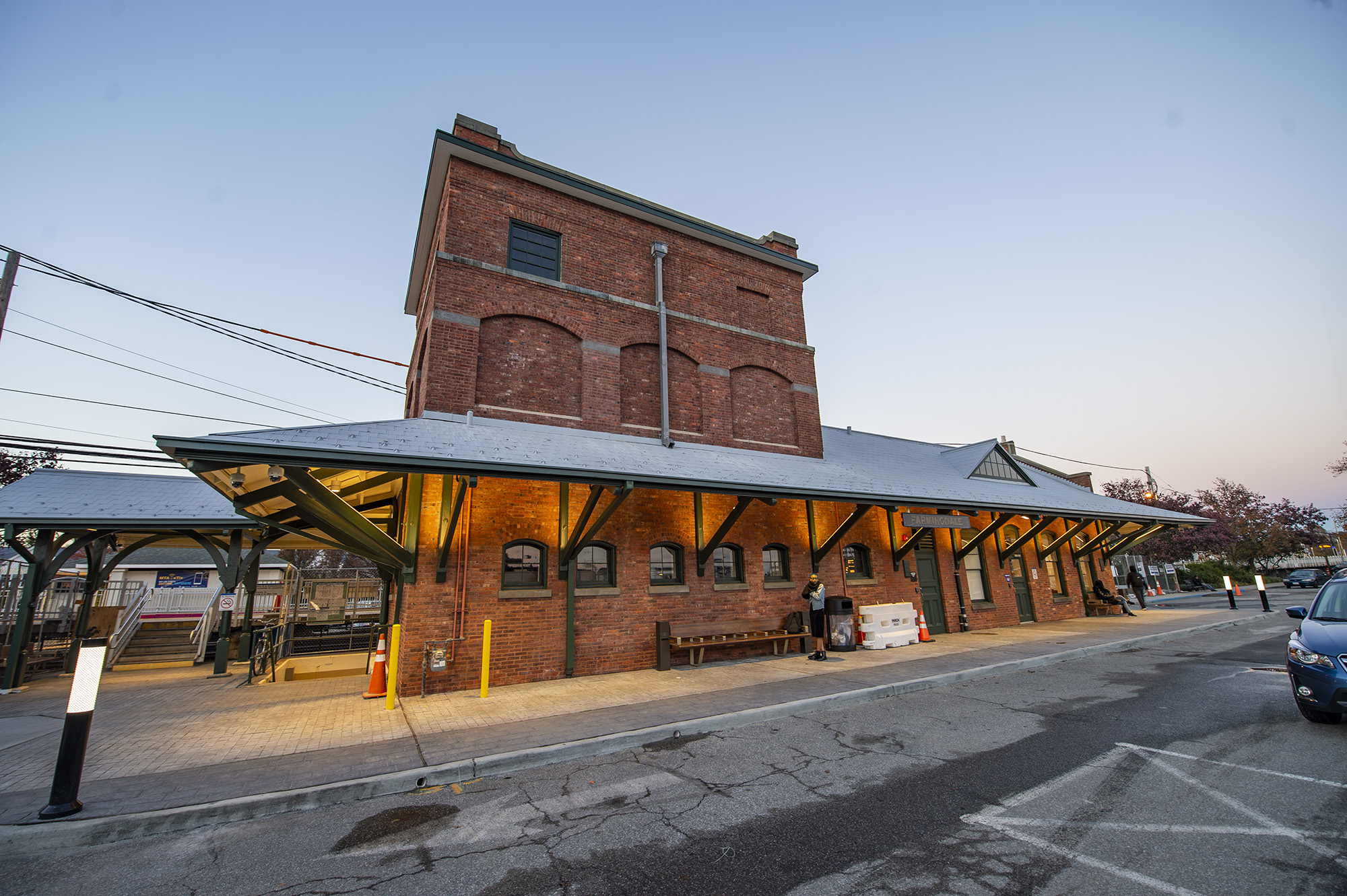
- The Farmingdale station house in 2018

General information
- Location: Off Secatogue Avenue, on Front Street & Atlantic Avenue; Farmingdale, New York
- Owner: Long Island Rail Road
- Line: Main Line
- Distance: 30.2 mi (48.6 km) from Long Island City
- Platforms: 2 side platforms
- Tracks: 2
- Connections: Nassau Inter-County Express: n70, n72 (on Conklin Street)

Construction
- Parking: Yes; Village Permit and Metered
- Cycle facilities: Yes; Bike Rack
- Accessible: Yes

Other information
- Station code: FMD
- Fare zone: 7

History
- Opened: October 15, 1841
- Rebuilt: 1875, 1890, 2018
- Electrified: 1987; 750 V (DC) third rail

Passengers
- 2012—2014: 3,820 per weekday

Services
| Preceding station | Long Island Rail Road | Following station |
|---|---|---|
| Bethpage toward Penn Station or Grand Central | Ronkonkoma Branch | Wyandanch toward Ronkonkoma |
| Bethpage toward Penn Station or Grand Central | Ronkonkoma Branch | Pinelawn limited service toward Ronkonkoma |
Former services
| Preceding station | Long Island Rail Road | Following station |
|---|---|---|
| Bethpage toward Long Island City or Penn Station | Main Line | Republic toward Greenport |
- Farmingdale Railroad Station
- U.S. National Register of Historic Places
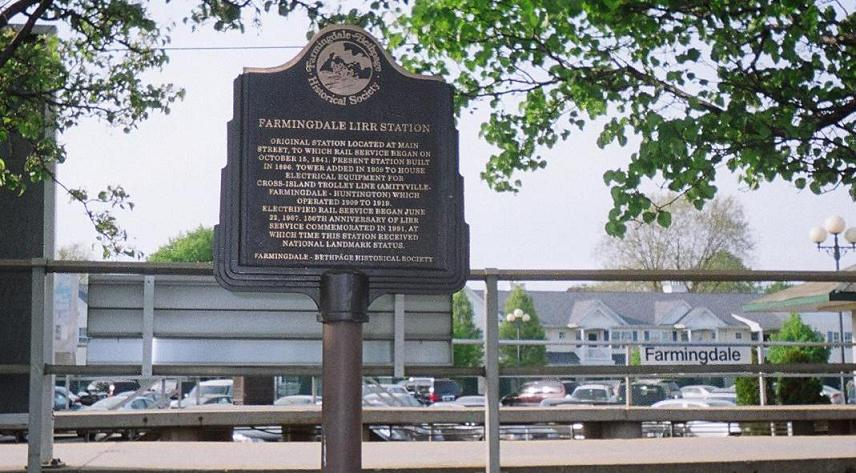
- Farmingdale station's Historical marker.
- Location: Farmingdale, New York, USA
- Coordinates: 40.735665°N 73.441713°W
- Built: 1890
- Architectural style: Queen Anne
- NRHP reference No.: 91001677
- Added to NRHP: November 13, 1991
Location

Farmingdale (co-signed as Farmingdale State College) is a railroad station in the Village of Farmingdale, Nassau County, New York, along the Main Line (Ronkonkoma Branch) of the Long Island Rail Road. It is located just east of Secatogue Avenue, on South Front Street and Atlantic Avenue. The station has two platforms, with an underground pedestrian walkway connecting them. The station house is on the south platform. Parking is available on both sides of the tracks.

== History ==
Farmingdale station was originally opened on October 15, 1841, when the Long Island Rail Road first went through the village. It was rebuilt in July 1875 and again in 1890. An electric sub-station was added between 1908 and 1909 for the Huntington Railroad. The Main Line was electrified from Hicksville to Ronkonkoma in 1987, and the Farmingdale station began serving electric trains in June 1987; the electrified line east of the station, meanwhile, was not officially in service until December 1987.

On November 13, 1991, the station house was added to the National Register of Historic Places. In 1996, federal funding from the Intermodal Surface Transportation Efficiency Act was obtained to restore the station building.

During the 2002 US Open and 2009 US Open golf tournaments at Bethpage State Park, the station was used by spectators as a transfer point to shuttle buses to Bethpage Black Course. In 2009, approximately 29 percent of all attendees arrived via the Long Island Rail Road.

The station underwent a renovation in 2018. The station received a new ADA-compliant station house, new canopies, new platform shelter, and added platform amenities such as help points and complimentary WiFi.

== Station layout ==
This station has two high-level side platforms, each 12 cars long. Westbound trains generally serve Platform A and eastbound trains Platform B, though some weekday trains stop at the opposite platform. Farmingdale is the eastbound terminal for select weekday trains.

=== Parking ===
Parking is available on both sides of the tracks, and requires either a permit from the Village of Farmingdale (available to residents and non-residents) or payment at parking meters. Meter regulations are not enforced on weekends. Another parking lot exists west of the station along Front Street and behind private property along the west side of Elizabeth Street. Village permits are also required for this parking lot.

== See also ==
- South Farmingdale station
