= Deer Park station =

Long Island Rail Road station in Suffolk County, New York

Deer Park
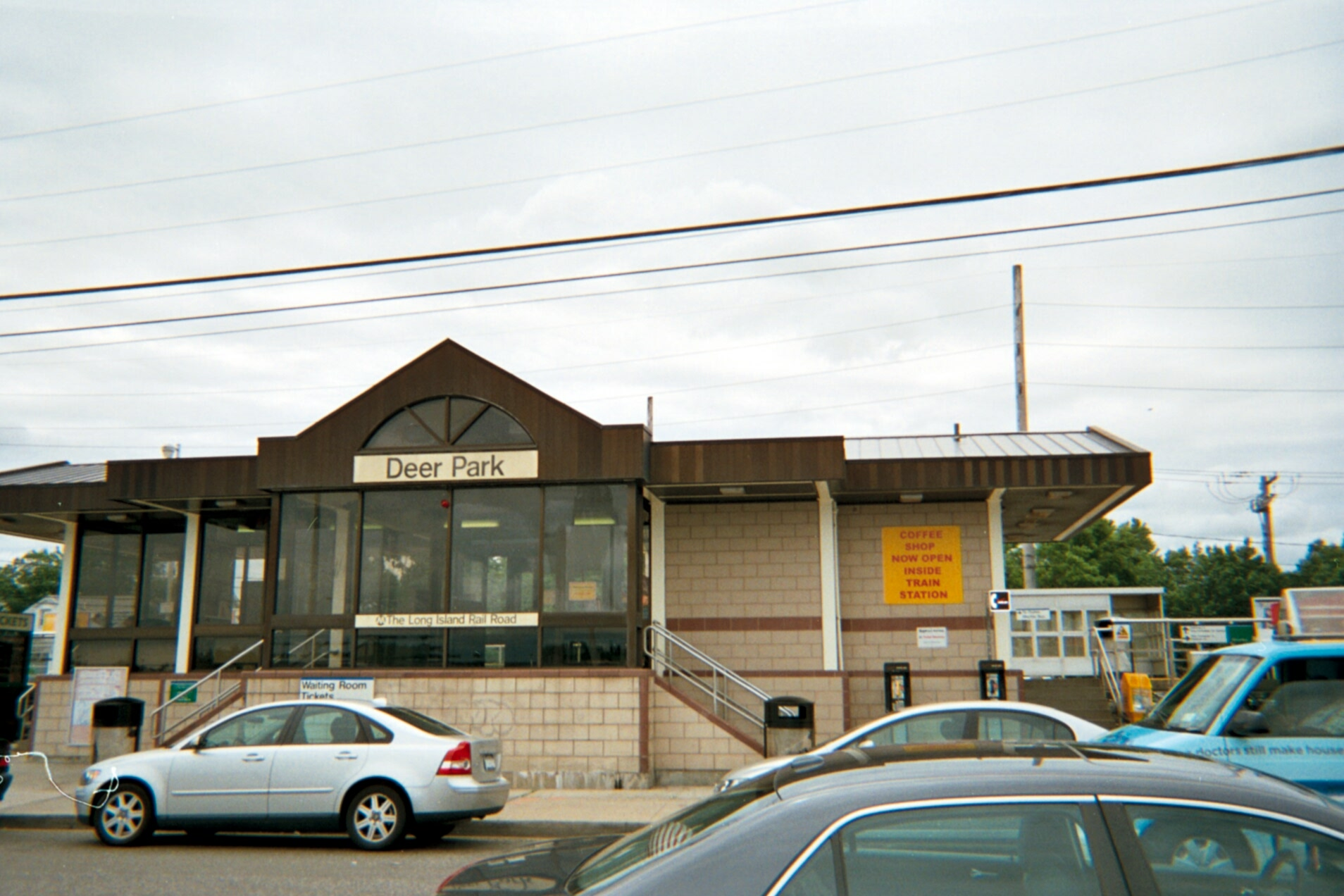
- The Deer Park station, as seen prior to its 2010s renovations

General information
- Location: Pineaire Drive, Grant (Executive) Avenue & Long Island Avenue; Baywood, New York
- Coordinates: 40°46′10″N 73°17′37″W
- Owner: Long Island Rail Road
- Line: Main Line
- Distance: 38.4 mi (61.8 km) from Long Island City
- Platforms: 2 side platforms
- Tracks: 2
- Connections: Suffolk County Transit: 4, 5 Tanger Outlets shuttle

Construction
- Parking: Yes; Free
- Cycle facilities: Yes; Bicycle Rack
- Accessible: Yes

Other information
- Station code: DPK
- Fare zone: 9

History
- Opened: 1842
- Electrified: January 18, 1988; 750 V (DC) third rail

Passengers
- 2012—2014: 6,189 per weekday

Services
| Preceding station | Long Island Rail Road | Following station |
|---|---|---|
| Wyandanch toward Penn Station or Grand Central | Ronkonkoma Branch | Brentwood toward Ronkonkoma |
Former services
| Preceding station | Long Island Rail Road | Following station |
|---|---|---|
| Wyandanch toward Long Island City or Penn Station | Main Line | Brentwood toward Greenport |
| Terminus | Pilgrim spur Sunday service; 1931–1978 | Pilgrim State Hospital Terminus |
Proposed services
| Preceding station | Amtrak | Following station |
|---|---|---|
| Hicksville toward Norfolk, Newport News or Christiansburg | Northeast Regional | Ronkonkoma Terminus |
Location

Deer Park is a station along the Main Line (Ronkonkoma Branch) of the Long Island Rail Road. It is located at Pineaire Drive, Executive (formerly Grant) Avenue, and Long Island Avenue in Baywood, New York.

== History ==
Deer Park, sometimes mentioned as Deerpark, station was previously located at the bridge over New York State Route 231, until it was moved as part of a major reconstruction project of the line at Ronkonkoma, Central Islip, Brentwood, Deer Park, and Wyandanch. The original station was built in 1842, then rebuilt in 1884, and again 1936 for the bridge over Deer Park Avenue (NY 231 did not exist at the time). The 1987-built station was built close to the former Pine Aire station near the Pilgrim State Psychiatric Center (see below), served as a replacement for both stations, and was also originally planned also to replace Brentwood Station until public opposition from Brentwood thwarted that proposal. As a result, some people refer to it as "Pine Aire" station rather than its given name. In the process of reconstruction, a former one-lane bridge was blocked off.

The station underwent a renovation in 2019 as part of the MTA's Enhanced Station Initiative and the LIRR's Double Track Project. The station received a new ADA-compliant station house, new canopies, new platform shelter, and added platform amenities such as help points and complimentary WiFi. The rebuilt station was designed by Urbahn Architects.

=== Pineaire station ===
Pineaire (or Pine Aire) was a station stop along the Ronkonkoma Branch of the Long Island Rail Road in West Brentwood, New York. It was located east of the Pilgrim State Hospital Spur than the currently combined Deer Park-Pineaire complex. In fact it was located on the east side of Sagtikos State Parkway on the opposite side of the intersection of Pine Aire Drive (formerly Edgewood Road) and Manatuck Boulevard. The station first opened around 1915 near the former Thompson's Station across from a freight spur, and was finally closed around October 1986, when the two stations were being combined into one.

=== Pilgrim State Hospital station ===
The former Pilgrim State Hospital station is located within Pilgrim State Psychiatric Center in West Brentwood, at the end of a spur leading south to the main line. The station was opened on October 1, 1931 and closed on May 21, 1978. The remains of the station can be found where G Road becomes Suffolk County Road 106 on the southwest corner of the Sagtikos State Parkway underpass.

=== Edgewood station ===
Nearly a century before the current Deer Park station was built, another LIRR station was built between the former Deer Park and Pine Aire Stations in the same area, named Edgewood. The station was a two-story wooden depot built in 1892 on Grant Avenue by a developer, but originally only existed as a signal stop. Service began to decline by June 1911 and it was closed down in 1914. Local residents used the station for scrap lumber. By the 1940s it became the site of the spur for Edgewood State Hospital, which began just west of the current Deer Park station and ran parallel to the west side of Grant Avenue. The hospital closed in 1971, and was demolished in 1989. While the existing Deer Park station is located on the west side of Executive Boulevard, the site of Edgewood station was on the east side of Grant Avenue and is occupied by a miniature golf course today.

== Station layout ==
The station has two high-level side platforms, each 12 cars long.

== Gallery ==
Deer Park station

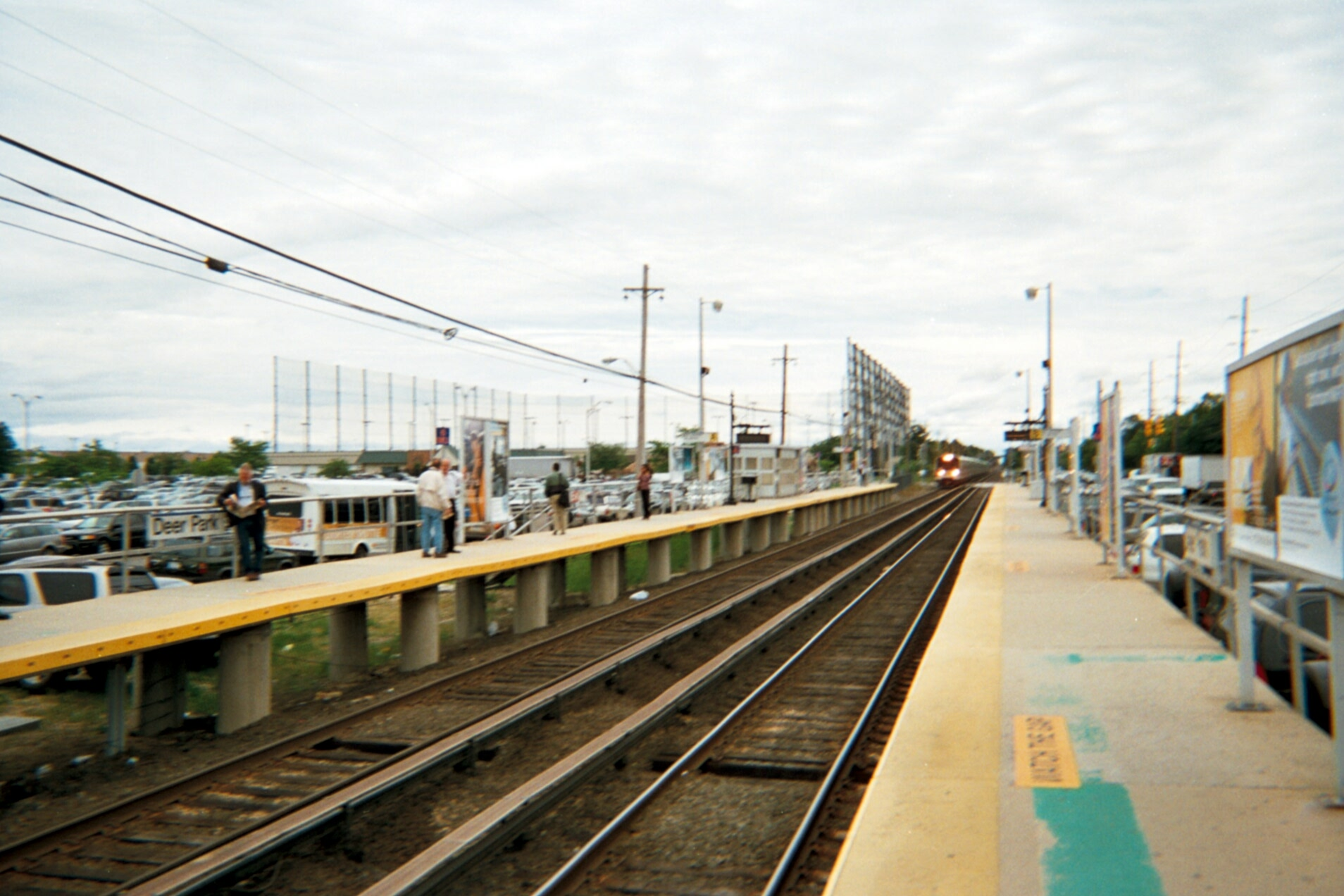
Penn Station-bound train arriving.

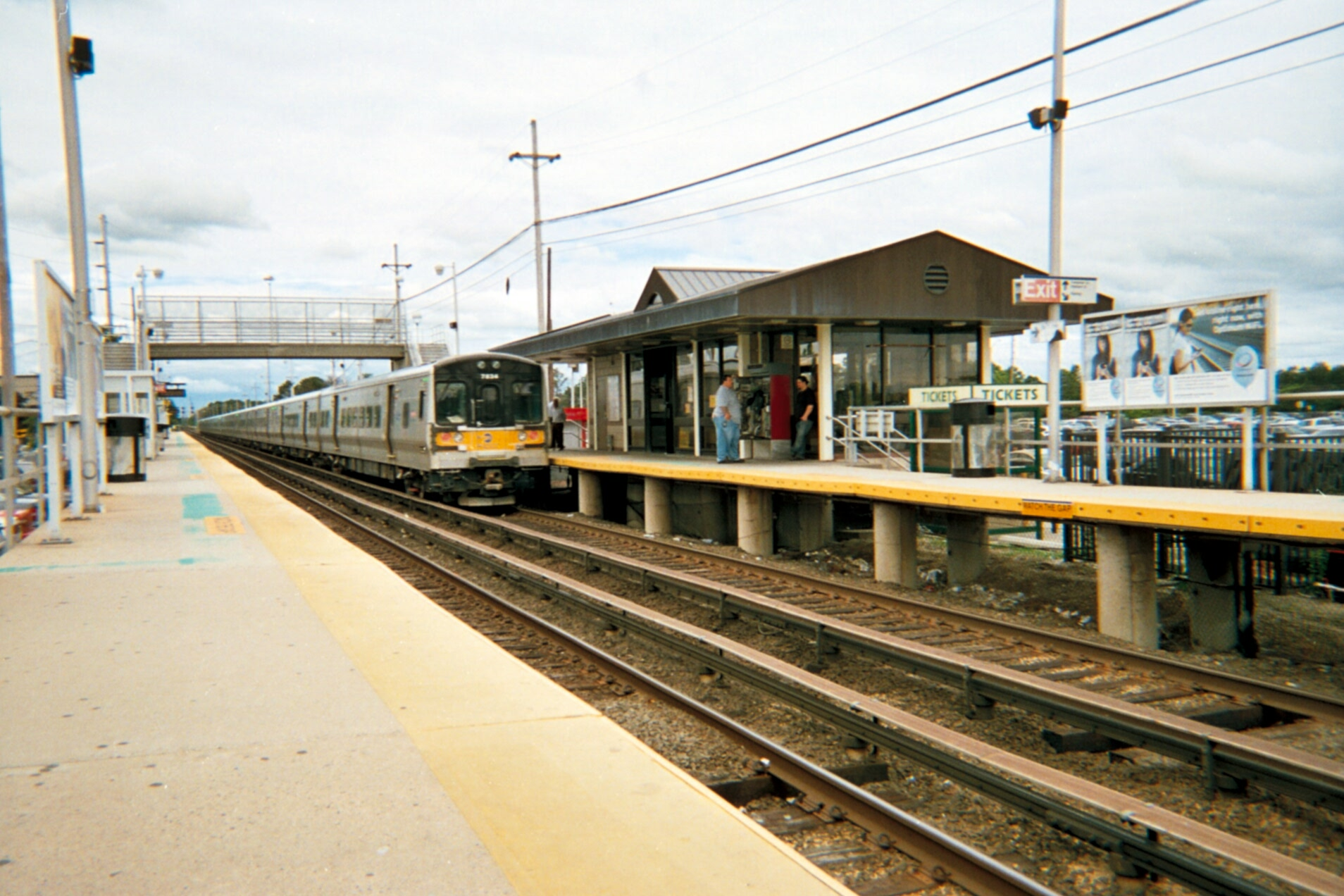
Penn Station-bound train departing.

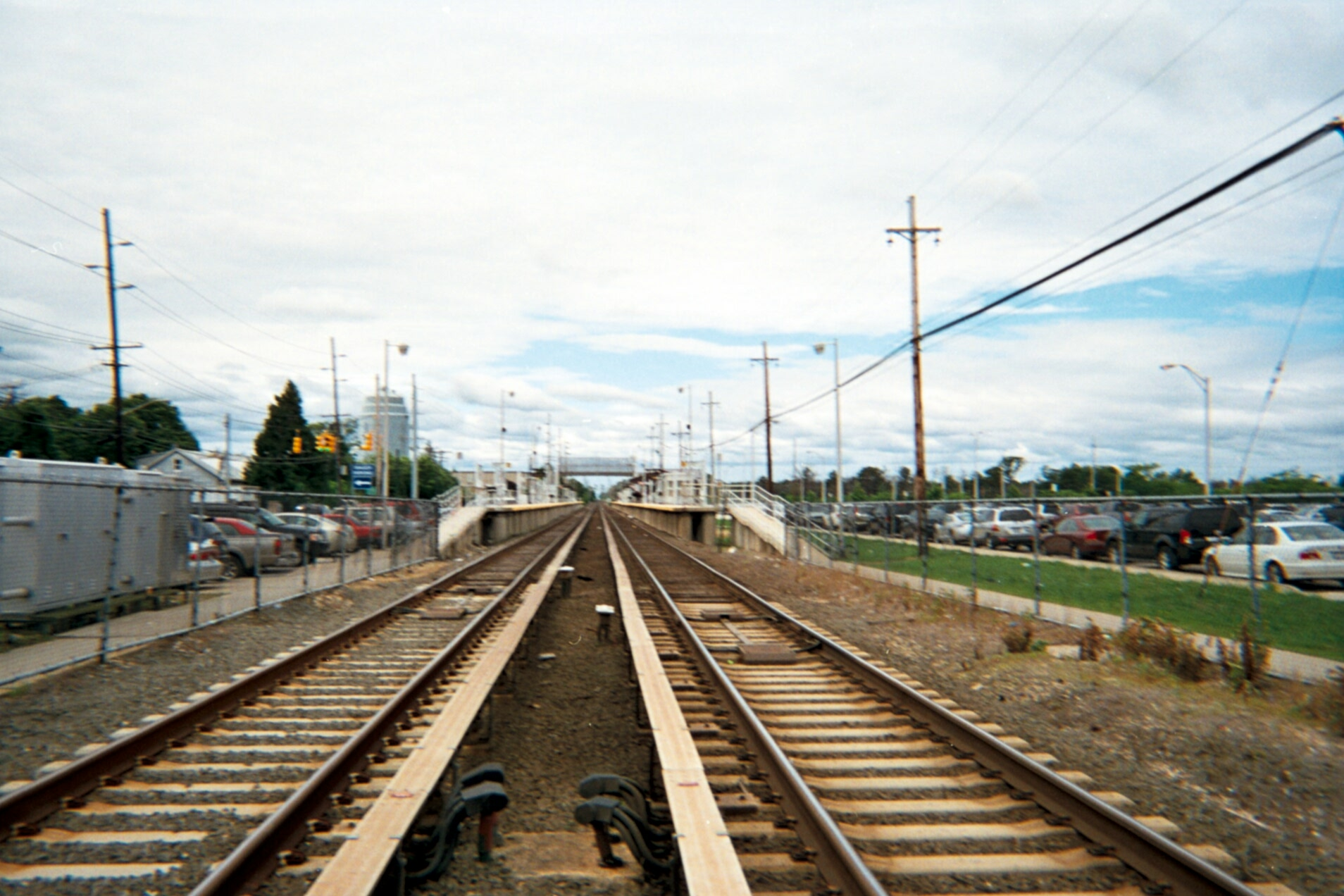
Westbound view from the Executive Drive railroad crossing.
