= Central Islip Psychiatric Center =

Psychiatric hospital in New York, United States

Coordinates: 40.759574°N 73.190585°W

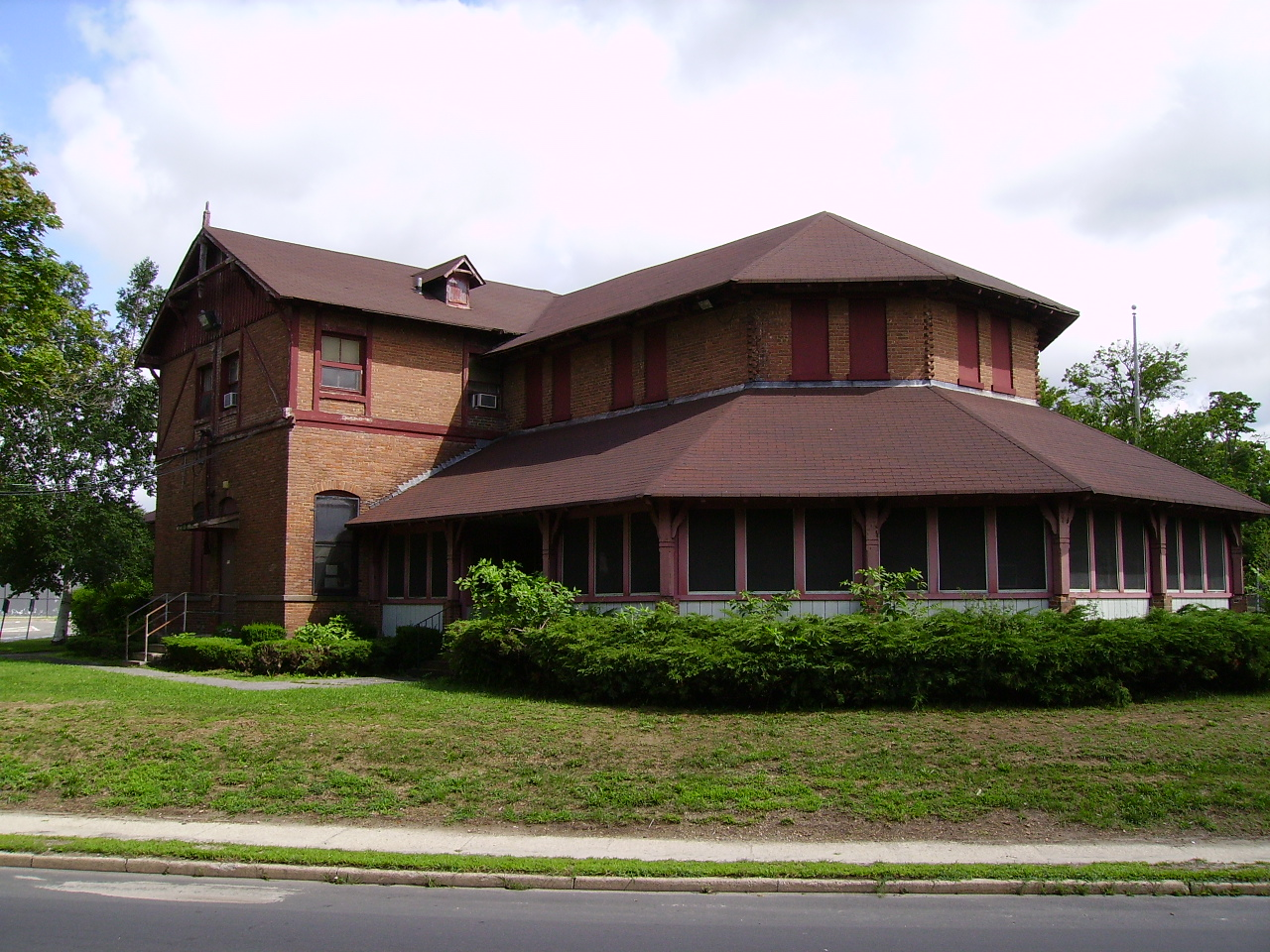
One of the original buildings which is now used for the Central Islip Recreation Center

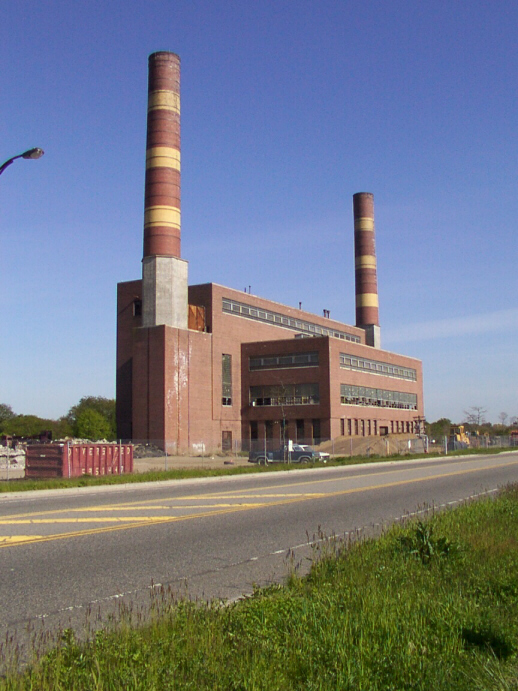
The 1953 Central Islip State Hospital Powerplant which was imploded in 2006.

The Central Islip Psychiatric Center, formerly State Hospital for the Insane, was a state psychiatric hospital in Central Islip, New York, United States from 1889 until 1996.

The center was one of the four major hospital "farms" in central Long Island to house the sick from New York City; the others were Kings Park, Pilgrim State Hospital, and Edgewood State Hospital. In 1955 it housed 10,000 patients, making it the second largest psychiatric hospital in the United States next to Pilgrim State Hospital, which was the largest psychiatric institution ever to exist in the United States.

== History ==
It opened in 1889 to house the sick from Manhattan in what was called at the time the New Colony. Kings County Farm Colony opened in the fall of 1886 to house those from Brooklyn. Pilgrim opened in 1931 and Edgewood in 1946 (which acted as Pilgrim's Tubercular Division).

The state bought the land for US$25 per acre.

49 male and 40 female patients were admitted in 1889 for "O&O" (Occupation and Oxygen) and "R&R" (Rest and Relaxation) at a working farm. Patients cleared the land, constructed buildings, made the furniture and mattresses, sewed their clothing, grew crops and raised dairy cattle, pigs and chickens.

After New York State bought it, it was renamed the Manhattan State Hospital for the Insane (although the "for the Insane" portion was frequently not included in articles).

The initial buildings grew to be a nearly mile-long interconnected series of buildings called the "string of pearls."

Until the Great Depression patients would arrive by a special hospital train with bars on the windows on a siding off the Long Island Rail Road.

More modern buildings were arranged closer together in the Sunburst building.

The hospital was renamed the Central Islip State Hospital and finally the Central Islip Psychiatric Center.

It closed on October 10, 1996 when the last patients were transferred to the Pilgrim Psychiatric Center.

== Current use ==
Most of the buildings, including the String of Pearls, have been demolished. The 1953 power plant was torn down in 2006, the Corcoran treatment building was torn down in 2008.

As the hospital was being phased out, part of its grounds were used for Suffolk County, New York to locate its offices in the John P. Cohalan Jr. Court Complex in 1992.

The New York Institute of Technology has the biggest collection of buildings in the Sunburst Building. The Town Center at Central Islip shopping center covers much of it. Islip Town Fire Museum, Fairfield Properties Ballpark, Touro Law Center, and the Alfonse M. D'Amato United States Courthouse are also on the land.

With the closure of most of the NYIT Central Islip Campus, a luxury apartment developer has begun renovating buildings into 354 studio, one-bedroom , two-bedroom, and three-bedroom apartments on 83 acres of the property.
