= Brentwood station (LIRR) =

Long Island Rail Road station in Suffolk County, New York

Brentwood
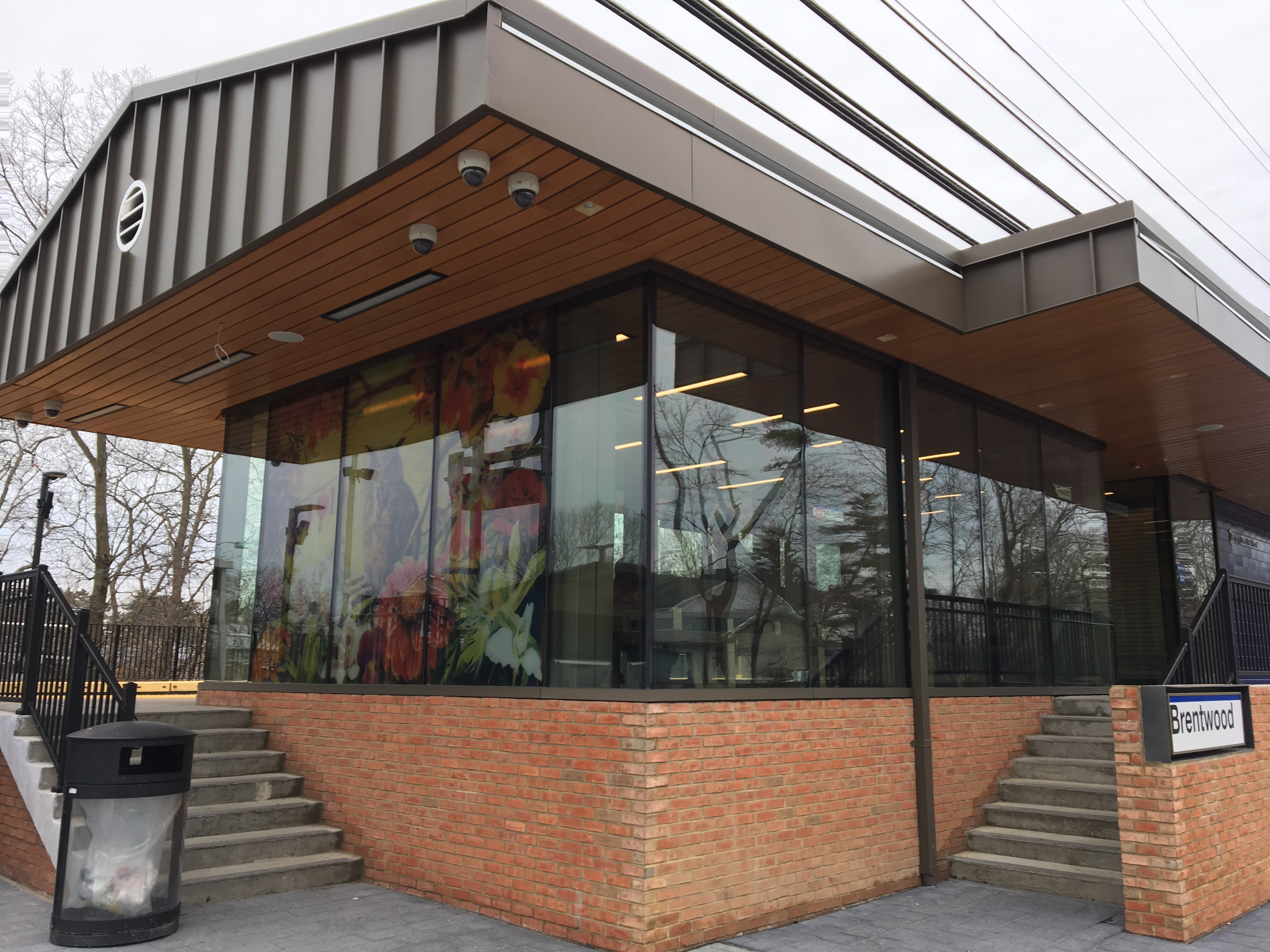
- The station house at the Brentwood station in March 2019, following its renovations

General information
- Location: Brentwood Road & Suffolk Avenue; Brentwood, New York
- Coordinates: 40°46′51″N 73°14′37″W
- Owner: Long Island Rail Road
- Line: Main Line
- Distance: 41.1 mi (66.1 km) from Long Island City
- Platforms: 2 side platforms
- Tracks: 2
- Connections: Suffolk County Transit: 4, 5, 7, 11, 58

Construction
- Parking: Yes
- Cycle facilities: Yes
- Accessible: Yes

Other information
- Station code: BWD
- Fare zone: 10

History
- Opened: 1987 (current station)
- Rebuilt: 1903, 1987, 2019
- Electrified: January 18, 1988; 750 V (DC) third rail
- Former names: Modern Times

Passengers
- 2012—2014: 2,906 per weekday

Services
Preceding station	Long Island Rail Road	Following station
Deer Park toward Penn Station or Grand Central	Ronkonkoma Branch	Central Islip toward Ronkonkoma
Former services
Preceding station	Long Island Rail Road	Following station
Deer Park toward Long Island City or Penn Station	Main Line	Central Islip toward Greenport
Location

Brentwood is a station on the Main Line (Ronkonkoma Branch) of the Long Island Rail Road. It is officially located at Suffolk Avenue (CR 100) and Brentwood Road in Brentwood, Suffolk County, New York. However, it has parking facilities and other amenities that are extended far beyond its given location. The actual station is located across the tracks from the dead end of Eighth Street near Leroy Avenue. The parking lot entrance is on Suffolk Avenue 0.5 miles (0.80 km) east of Brentwood Road/Washington Avenue.

== History ==
The station opened as Modern Times and was renamed Brentwood on September 7, 1864. The post office moved here from Thompson's station on January 17, 1870. Inhabitants donated land and money for the depot which was erected in 1870. The depot was burned in April 1903 and was replaced on November 10, 1903. Until 1987, Brentwood station was located on First Avenue between Fourth Street and Brentwood Road. It was moved as part of a major electrification and reconstruction project of the line in Ronkonkoma, Central Islip, Brentwood, Deer Park, and Wyandanch. Originally, the LIRR had planned to merge Deer Park, Pineaire, and Brentwood stations into a single station; however, residential opposition blocked that proposal, and only Deer Park and Pineaire were merged. The current station was built close to the former Brentwood station, which was converted into a restaurant shortly after it was abandoned. All grade crossings in the Brentwood area remained unchanged after the station was moved.

The station underwent a renovation in 2019 as part of the MTA's Enhanced Station Initiative and the LIRR's Double Track Project. The station received a new ADA-compliant station house, new canopies, new platform shelter, and added platform amenities such as help points and complimentary WiFi. The rebuilt station was designed by Urbahn Architects.

=== Thompson's station ===
Prior to the construction of Brentwood station, another station existed in Brentwood where the Sagtikos State Parkway now crosses over the Main Line of the Long Island Rail Road. This was known as Thompson's station or Thompson's Siding, and served as a private home, a station, an inn, and a general store. It was opened as a station on June 24, 1842, with the arrival of the railroad, and closed in December 1869, before Brentwood station was built further east. The railroad spur continued to exist through the 20th Century and was used as a freight spur which served industries such as Hills Supermarkets, Thompson Tires and Carnation Paper. The site was replaced with the former Pineaire in 1915, until it was closed in 1986 and combined into the new Deer Park west of Sagtikos State Parkway.

== Station layout ==
This station has two high-level side platforms, each 12 cars long.

== Gallery ==
Brentwood station

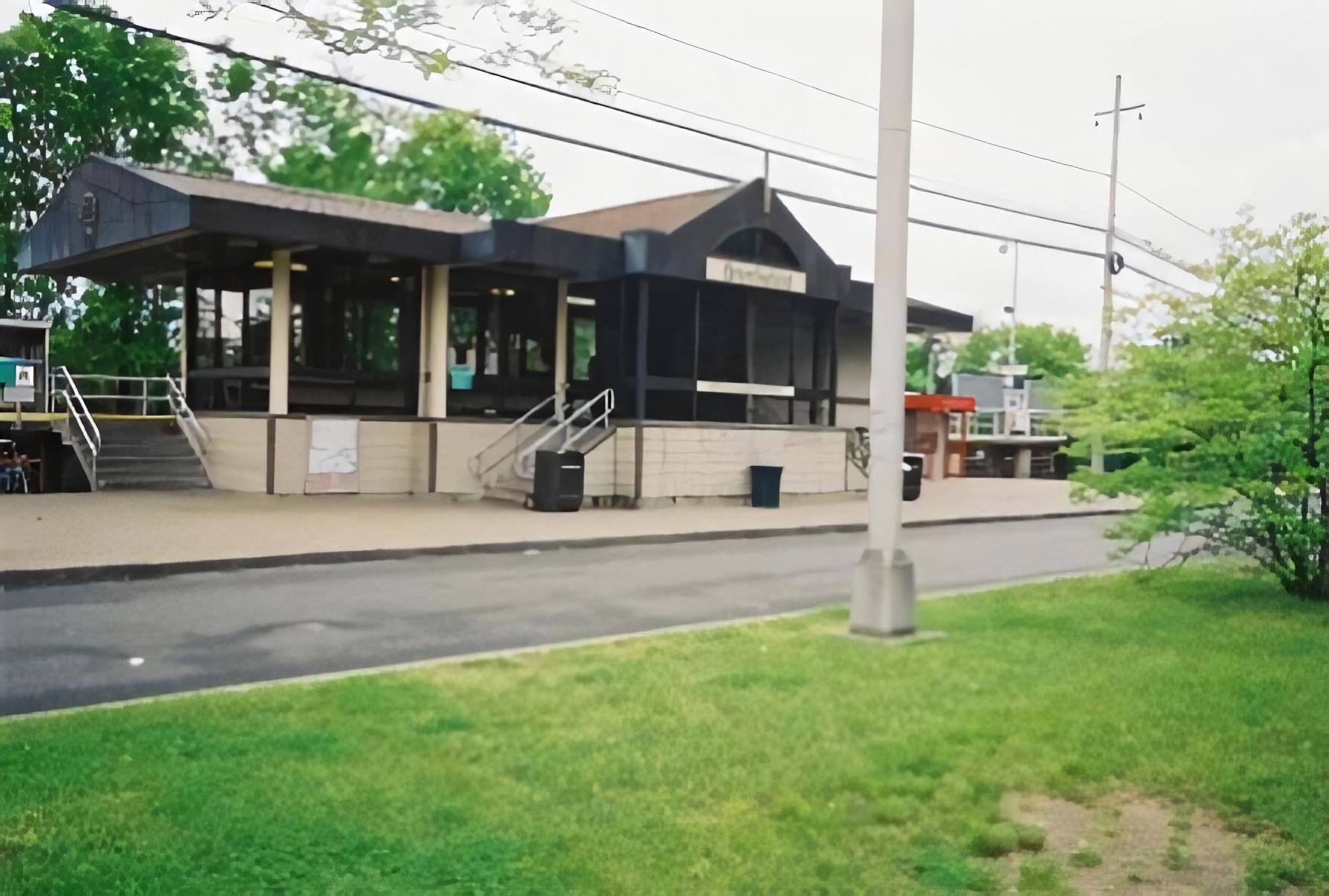
The station house prior to renovations.

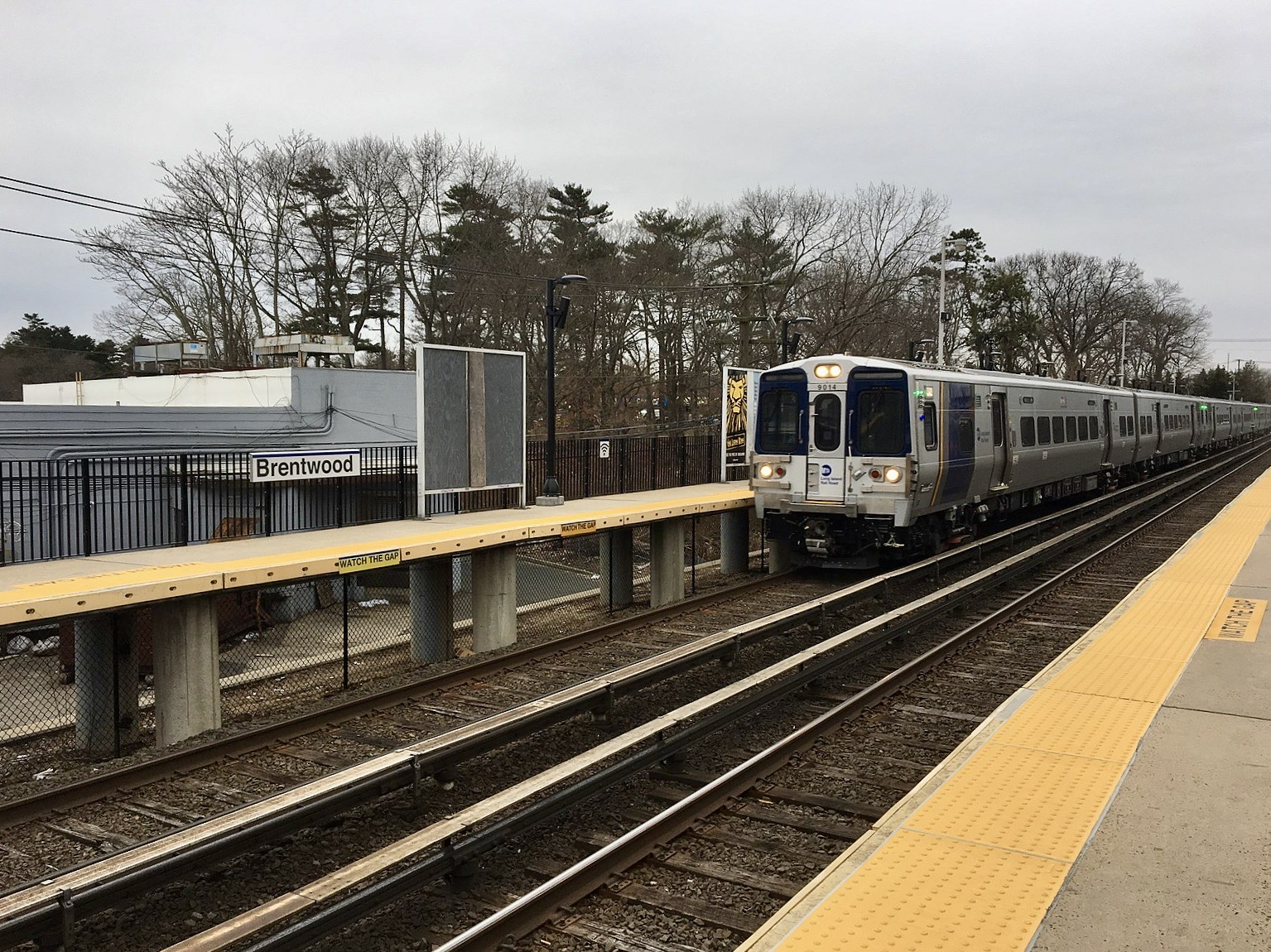
Test run of an M9 passing through.

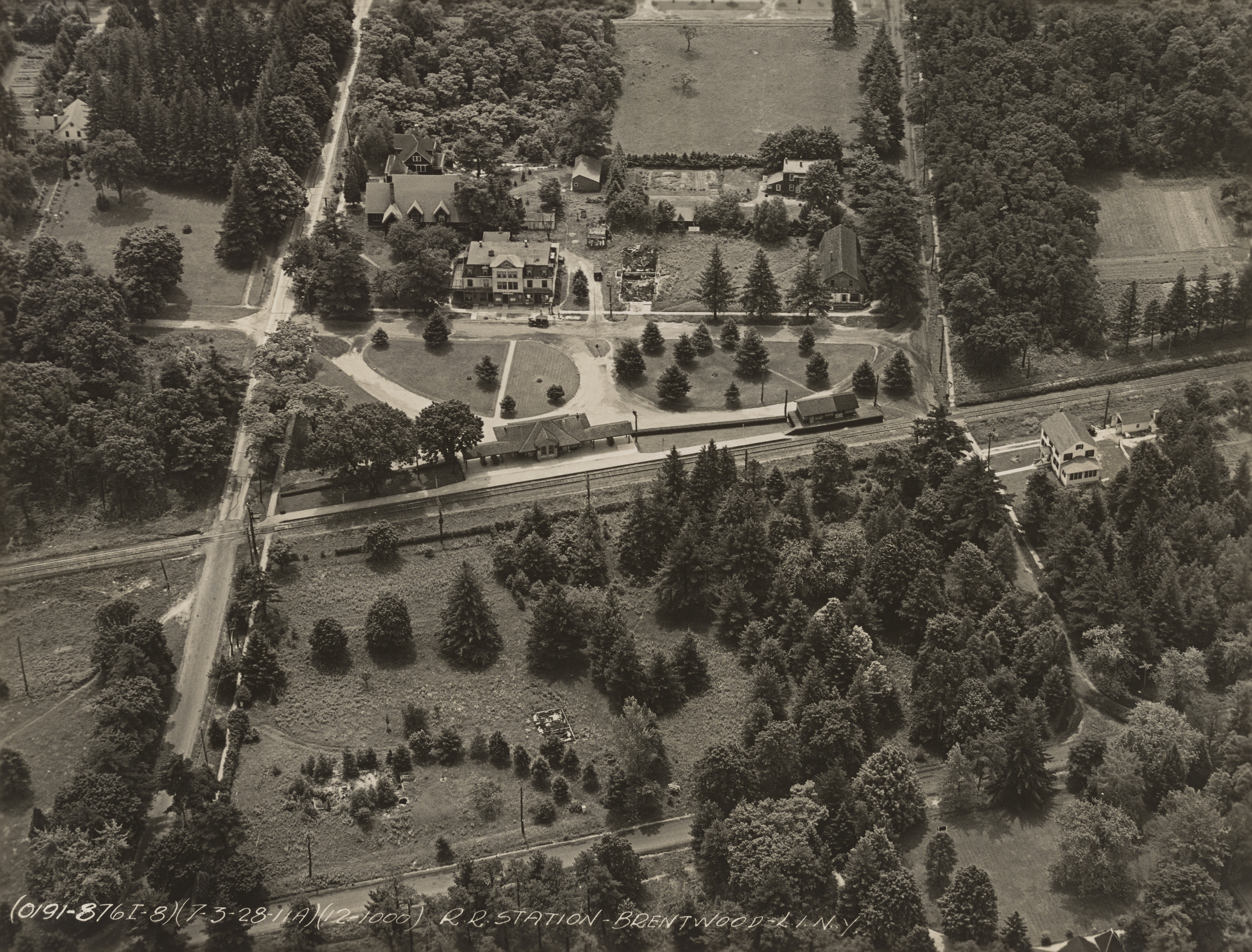
Brentwood station aerial view in 1931
