= Suffolk County Transit =

Public bus system in Suffolk County, New York

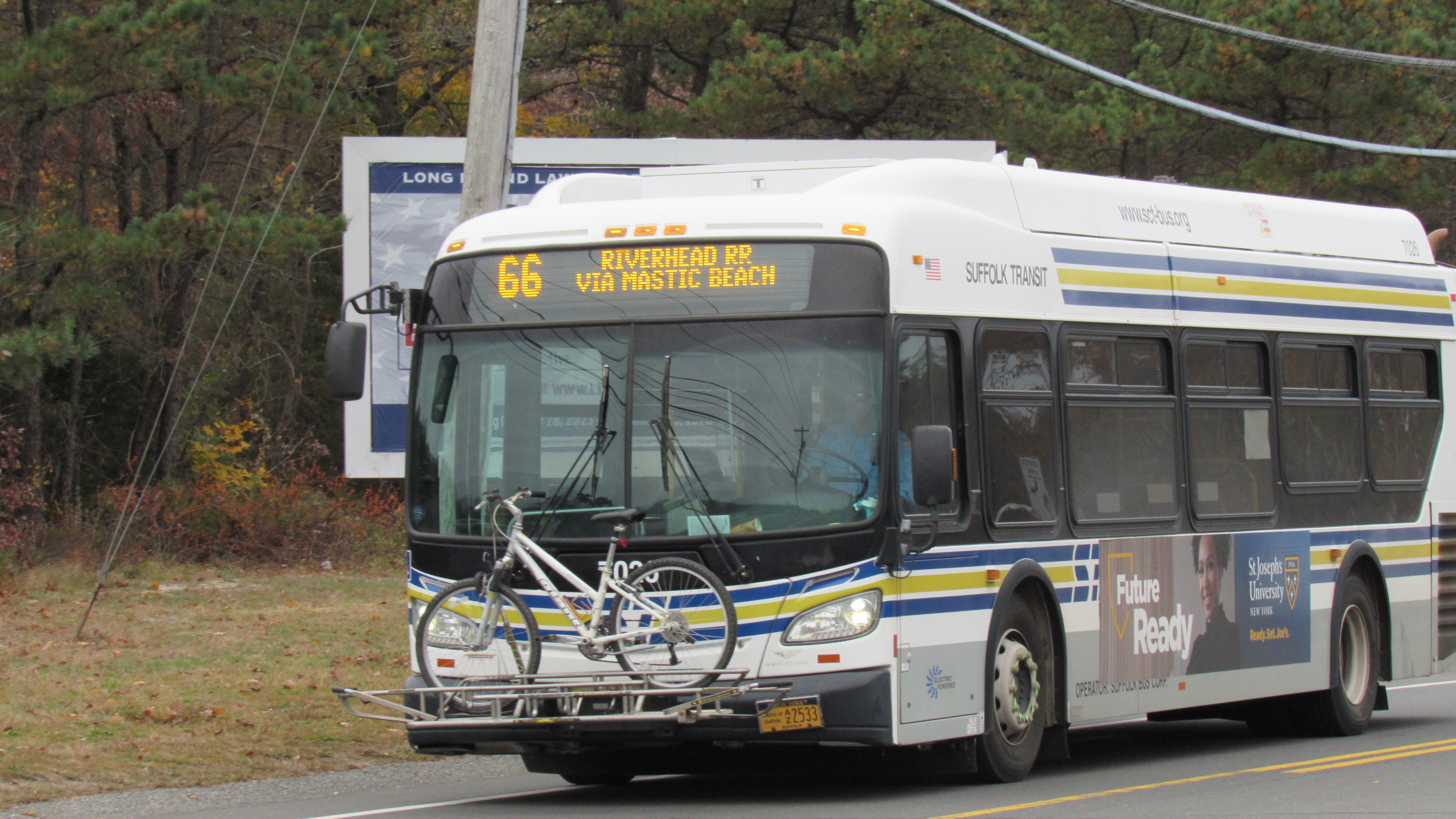
- Suffolk County Transit #7026 on the 66
- Founded: 1980
- Headquarters: Yaphank, New York
- Service area: Suffolk County
- Service type: Bus service, microtransit, paratransit
- Routes: 24, 3 On-Demand Zones
- Destinations: Full county-wide service with major hubs at Amityville LIRR station, Bay Shore, Brentwood LIRR station, Central Islip LIRR station, Patchogue LIRR station, Riverhead LIRR station and the Smith Haven Mall.
- Depots: 7 (1 EBT, 3 Suffolk Bus Corp, 1 Sunrise Coach, 2 Hampton Jitney)
- Fleet: 154 Fixed route, 195 SCAT/On-Demand (2025 figures)
- Fuel type: Diesel, Hybrid-Electric, Electric
- Operator: See operator list below
- Website: sctbus.org

Suffolk County Transit (SCT) is the public transit bus system of Suffolk County, New York, on Long Island, and is an agency of the Suffolk County government. It was founded in 1980 as a county-run oversight and funding agency for a group of private contract operators which previously provided such services on their own. While the physical maintenance and operation of the buses continue to be provided by these contractors, other matters ranging from bus purchases to route and schedule planning to fare rules are set by Suffolk Transit itself.

Though serving the entirety of Suffolk County, the one exception is in Huntington – located in the northwestern part of the county, where that town's private operator declined to join SCT. Instead, Huntington took over that town's system which became Huntington Area Rapid Transit, or HART. Most of HART's routes do connect to both Suffolk County Transit and Nassau Inter-County Express, transfers can be made between HART and SCT. In addition, the village of Patchogue previously had its own local bus service, but discontinued it.

== History ==
=== Predecessors ===
Prior to the formation of Suffolk County Transit in 1980, public bus services within Suffolk County were provided by private operators. These included the Bornscheuer Bus Company, which served Amityville, Copiague, Lindenhurst, West Babylon, and Babylon. An affiliated company – EBT, Inc. (an affiliate of school bus company Educational Bus Transportation, Inc.) – continues to operate several of these routes under contract with Suffolk County Transit.

In Central Suffolk, the East Patchogue-based Louis A. Fuoco Bus Line (1962–1992) served Patchogue, East Patchogue, Hagerman, Bellport, South Haven, Mastic, Mastic Beach, Port Jefferson, Medford, Coram, Ridge, Calverton, and Riverhead; it continued to exist during early years of Suffolk County Transit. Additionally, although Coram Bus Service (1958–1992) primarily operated school buses, that company began operating mass transit routes in the Town of Brookhaven towards locations as far west as Commack and East Northport, and as far east as Riverhead.

In Western Suffolk and on the North Shore, the Huntington Coach Corporation (1927–present) served Huntington, East Farmingdale, Melville, and Halesite. Quinn's Bus Lines (and later Coram Bus Service, after the two merged in 1969) mainly served the area between Port Jefferson and Wading River – especially after the demise of the Wading River Extension of the Port Jefferson Branch.

In the western parts of the Town of Islip, Suffolk Bus Corporation (1946–present) served Bay Shore, Brentwood, West Brentwood, Central Islip, Islip, and Babylon; it continues to operate several of these routes under contract with Suffolk County Transit.

On the East End, Sunrise Coach Lines (1946–present) served Greenport, Riverhead, Southampton, Sag Harbor, and East Hampton; it continues to operate several of these routes under contract with joint venture Twin Forks Transit for the routes they originally operated for Suffolk County Transit. In 2006, Sunrise Coach's EXPRESS Routes were purchased by Hampton Jitney. This joint venture was discontinued on October 29, 2023, as the discontinuation of the S92 – which had been co-operated by Sunrise and Hampton Jitney – rendered it obsolete.

Utility Lines – a Bee Line, Inc. subsidiary – ran from Patchogue via Montauk Highway, thence Merrick Road into Nassau County. This line was merged into the Metropolitan Suburban Bus Authority (MSBA) in 1973, but funding and service disputes lead to the splitting of that route between the N19 west of Babylon and S40 east of Babylon.

Inter-County Motor Coach Incorporated – based in the Village of Babylon – has been operating since 1922. Affiliated companies included Babylon Transit (operating from 1937 until around 1986), and Lindenhurst Bus Company (which operated from 1952 to 1986) – both companies running in their final years under contract with Suffolk County Transit.

Alert Coach, an affiliate of Baumann & Sons Buses, Incorporated, and Acme Bus Corporation began on November 30, 1966, and had at least four lines within the county, which included a troubled history with the Suffolk portion of the old Utility Lines bus.

=== Suffolk County Transit (1980–present) ===
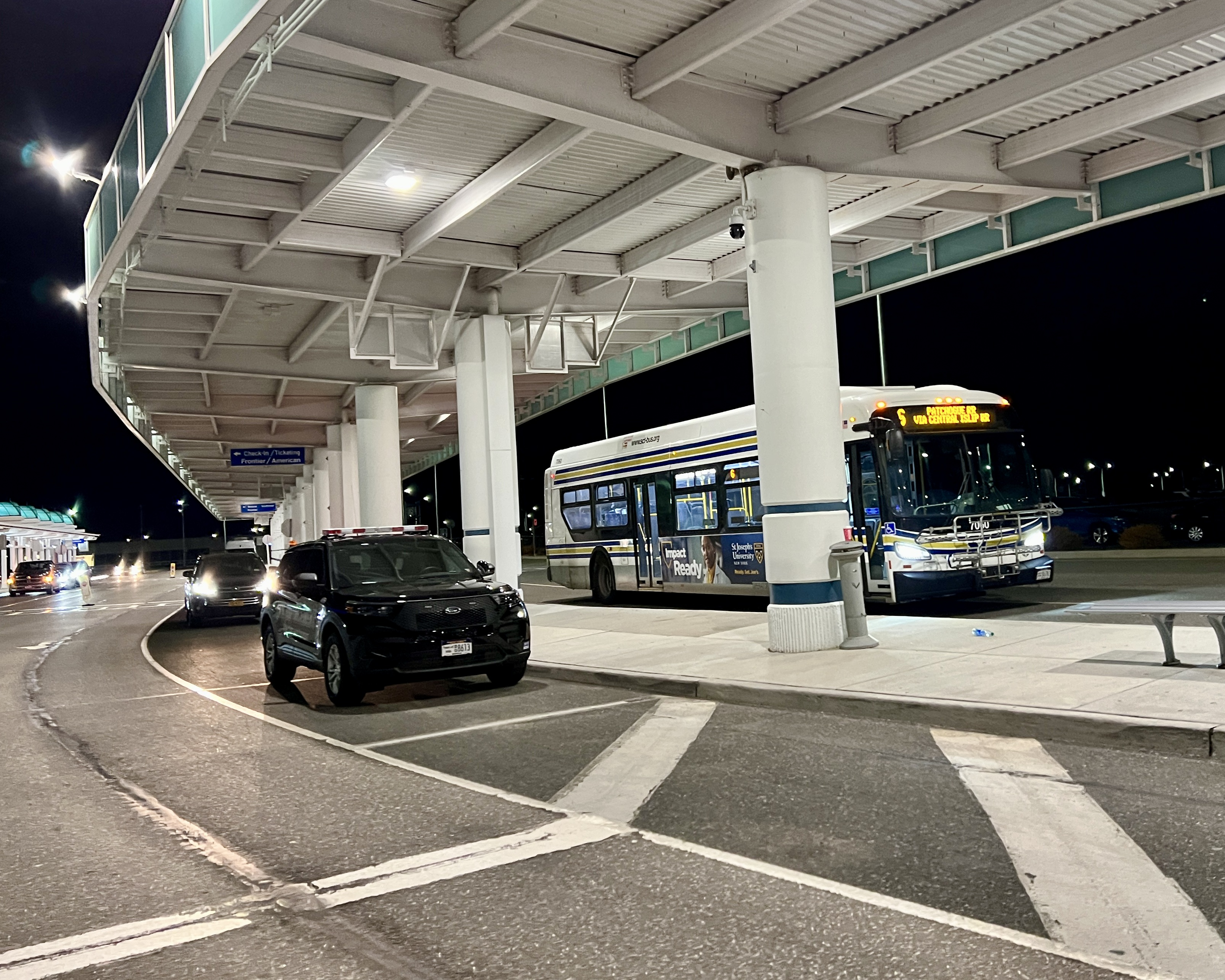
A SCT 6 bus at Long Island MacArthur Airport in 2023

Suffolk County Transit was established in 1980, as the consolidation of the various private bus companies – several of which would become contractors for the county and its new bus services – that predated the agency and previously operated the bus services independently.

During his tenure as Suffolk County executive, Steve Levy proposed a takeover of Suffolk County Transit by the Metropolitan Transportation Authority.

In 2011, the Suffolk County Legislature authorized a fare hike from $1.50 to $2.00 on the S92 and 10C routes only. In return, service on those two routes was expanded to Sunday during the summer months. The fare hike took place on June 17, 2011, with Sunday service operating from July until September.

In 2023, Suffolk County Transit released their redesign plan for routes, as part of its "Reimagine Transit" initiative. This redesign was supposed to go into effect on October 1, 2023, but was postponed until the end of that month. Because of this, NICE bus made a change to weekend service on the n71 bus route in September 2023, to provide a connection to the timed transfer point at Amityville from the Sunrise Mall in Nassau County, where both the n71 and S20 (now route 2) previously terminated.

On October 29, 2023, the redesigned network's new services went into effect. All new routes, maps, and schedules were posted on the agency's website – and the "S" route prefix was eliminated on all bus routes and their designations. On October 26, 2026, schedule changes were made reflecting on the redesigned routes, including the elimination of the 77, 77Y and the extension of former S110 Suffolk Clipper to the Long Island Express (HOV) Bus.

== Fare ==
The current Suffolk County Transit base fare for most one-way local bus travel is $2.25. For seniors, veterans, and disabled people, the base fare is $0.75; personal care attendants (PCA) may ride for free when traveling with seniors or disabled people. Students with school-issued identification pay a reduced fare of $1.25. Undergraduate students of Stony Brook University – which prepays for the rides at the start of the school year so that it does not have to run its own buses – may ride to the Smith Haven Mall on Route 51 for free on weekends, with a valid SBU ID. Children under five years of age are free, with a limit of three children for every paying adult.

Fare payment is conducted with Suffolk Transit bus tokens, coins or paper currency, or via the FastFare app. If excess fare is paid, a paper card is issued with the difference in balance. Bus transfers cost an additional $0.25, and must be requested and paid for upon boarding the bus. These transfers are valid for two hours after issue and can be used on Suffolk County Transit connecting routes, Huntington Area Rapid Transit (HART) or to Nassau Inter-County Express (NICE) connecting routes. Transfers from SCT to NICE require payment of an additional $0.25 "step-up" fare, while transferring from NICE to SCT does not.

== Operations ==
=== Bus service hours ===
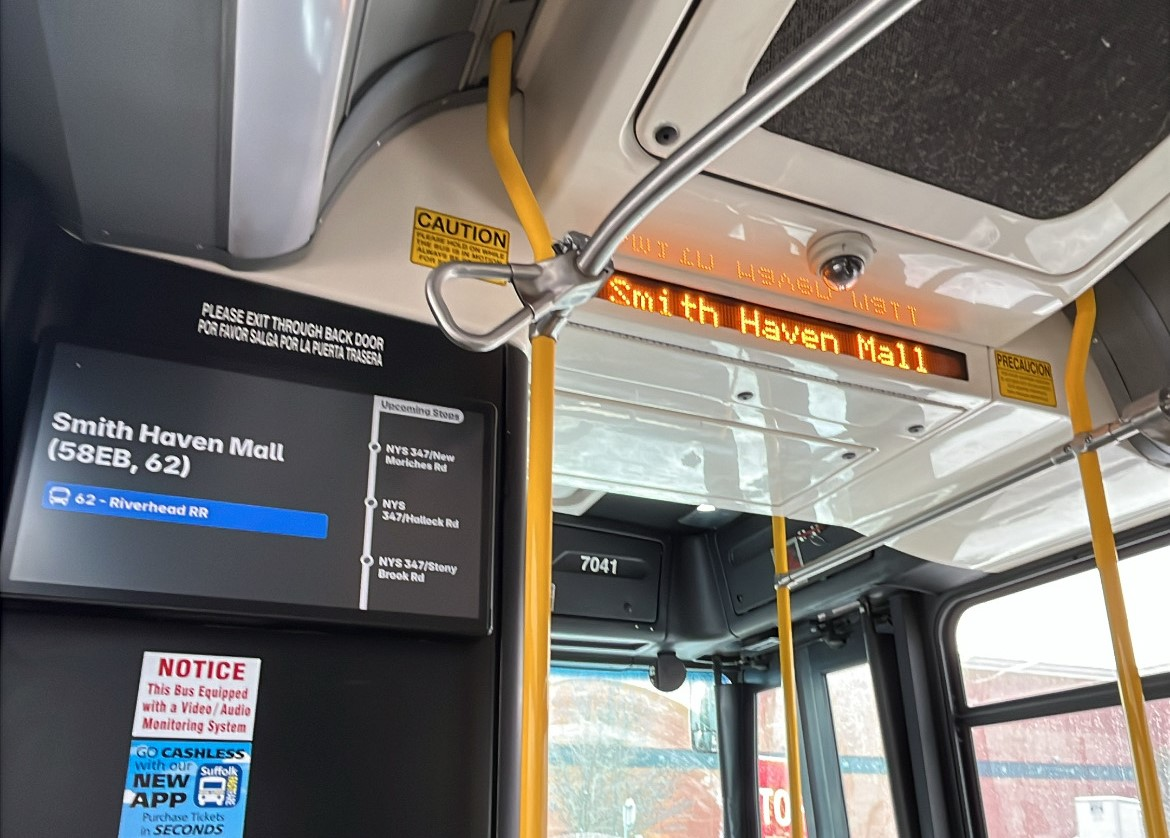
SCT Next Stop display and LED screen – new systems installed in the 2020s – in 2025

Suffolk County Transit bus service operates seven days a week. All routes run Monday through Friday, 6 a.m. to 10 p.m., Saturdays 6 a.m. to 9 p.m. and Sundays 6 a.m. to 8 p.m. with a few exceptions on weekdays where some routes start around 5 a.m. and others end service right before 12 midnight.

On weekdays, routes 1, 2, 4, 5, 6, 7, 11, 12, 17, 51, 52 (between Central Islip and Selden, and the Gordon Heights terminus), and 66 operate every 30 minutes on weekdays until 6 p.m., with route 17 until 7 p.m., and route 1 until 8 p.m.

Routes 3, 10, 15, 53, 55, 56, 58, 62, 80, and 92 operate every 60 minutes on weekdays at all times. Route 495 (HOV Long Island Express) operates in directional 60-minute peak service only, and routes 52A/B run every 60 minutes on weekdays between Selden and Gordon Heights.

On weekends and holidays, all routes operate every 60 minutes.

Routes 52B, 56, and 495 (HOV Long Island Express) operate weekdays only.

Route 495 (HOV Long Island Express) operates during peak hours only.

Route 15 operates only during daytime in the summer.

SCT now runs on all 365 days of the year, including holidays.

=== Route assignments ===
Rather than operate its services in-house like many other transit agencies, Suffolk County Transit contracts all their routes to private contractors.

The table below lists the private contractors hired to provide fixed-route services and their assignments as of June 3, 2024. It does not include Suffolk County Accessible Transportation (SCAT) paratransit service, which is solely operated by Suffolk Bus Corporation.

Company	Routes
Suffolk Bus Corporation	2, 11, 15, 17, 51, 52A, 52B, 53, 55, 56, 58, 62, 66, 495 (HOV Long Island Express), South Country On-Demand Zone
EBT Inc.	1, 3, 4, 5, 6, 7, 10, 12
Sunrise Coach Lines Inc.	80, 92
Hampton Jitney	East Hampton–Montauk, Southampton–Sag Harbor On-Demand Zones

Note: EBT Inc. is the operator of Suffolk County Transit Buses, and is the sister company of Educational Bus Transportation (a school bus company).

Note: As of October 29, 2023, Twin Forks Transit has been split into separate operations by Sunrise Coach Lines and Hampton Jitney, as route 92 is no longer co-operated by Sunrise and Hampton Jitney.

== Fleet ==
=== Current Fixed-route Fleet ===
Photo	Year	Manufacturer	Model	Length	Fleet number	Number in service	Notes
	2010	DaimlerChrysler North America	Orion VII Next Generation; 07.501	40.5 ft	1001-1015 (15 buses)	8 (retiring)	1001-1009, 1011 assigned to EBT, Inc.; 1007, 1011 out of service; Soon to be replaced by the ongoing delivery of 2026-27 New Flyer Xcelsior buses
	2010	DaimlerChrysler North America	Orion VII Next Generation; 07.502	35 ft	1016-1065 (50 buses)	20 (retiring)	1016, 1018, 1021, 1022, 1024-1026, 1037, 1038, 1059-1062 assigned to Suffolk Bus Corp; 1040, 1041, 1044, 1048, 1049, 1053, 1055, 1056 assigned to EBT, Inc; 1021 out of service for an unknown reason, currently at the NEBR facility in Ronkonkoma; 1062 is a training unit and is part of the reserve fleet for Suffolk Bus Corp.; Currently being replaced by the ongoing delivery of 2026-27 New Flyer Xcelsior buses
	2010	DaimlerChrysler North America	Orion VII Next Generation; 07.503	32.5 ft	1066-1081 (16 buses)	5 (retiring)	1067, 1070, 1071, 1073, 1075 assigned to Suffolk Bus Corp; Soon to be replaced by the ongoing delivery of 2026-27 New Flyer Xcelsior buses
	2017	New Flyer	Xcelsior; XDE40	40 ft	7001-7010 (10 buses)	10	Assigned to Sunrise Coach Lines, Inc.
	2017	New Flyer	Xcelsior; XDE35	35 ft	7011-7030 (20 buses)	18	7011-7017, 7019, 7020 assigned to EBT, Inc; 7021-7030 assigned to Suffolk Bus Corp.; 7029 out of service, currently at a repair shop in Lodi, NJ
	2017	ARBOC	Spirit of Mobility	29 ft	7101-7140 (40 buses)	3 (retiring)	Chevrolet Express G4500 chassis; 7110, 7127, 7137 assigned to Suffolk Bus Corp.; The vast majority of the fleet is retired; Some units were replaced by several retrofitted 2020 Coach and Equipment Phoenix minibuses (Former SCAT buses); Currently being replaced by the ongoing delivery of 2026-27 New Flyer Xcelsior buses
	2019	New Flyer	Xcelsior; XDE35	35 ft	7031-7046 (16 buses)	15	7031-7033 assigned to Sunrise Coach Lines, Inc.; 7034-7037 assigned to EBT, Inc.; 7038-7046 assigned to Suffolk Bus Corp.; 7040 out of service for an unknown reason, currently at the NEBR facility in Ronkonkoma
	2019	New Flyer	Xcelsior; XDE40	40 ft	7047-7052 (6 buses)	5	7047-7048 assigned to Sunrise Coach Lines, Inc.; 7049-7052 assigned to Suffolk Bus Corp.; 7052 out of service for an unknown reason
7060 s1 xcelsior	2020	New Flyer	Xcelsior; XDE35	35 ft	7053-7056, 7061–7071 (15 buses)	14	7053-7056 assigned to EBT, Inc.; 7061-7071 assigned to Suffolk Bus Corp.; 7071 out of service for an unknown reason, currently at a facility in Commack, NY
	2020	New Flyer	Xcelsior; XDE40	40 ft	7057-7060, 7072–7073 (6 buses)	6	7057-7060 assigned to EBT, Inc.; 7072-7073 assigned to Sunrise Coach Lines, Inc.
	2020	Coach and Equipment	Phoenix	20.8 ft	20001–20003, 20037–20040 (7 buses)	4 (retiring)	Ford F-350 chassis; 20037-20040 assigned to Suffolk Bus Corp.; 20001-20003 are retired; Displaced from SCAT paratransit service and retrofitted for fixed-route service to replace some of the 2017 ARBOC Spirit of Mobility bus fleet; Currently being replaced by the ongoing delivery of 2026-27 New Flyer Xcelsior buses; 2020 Models
	2020	Coach and Equipment	Phoenix	26 ft	20041–20045 (5 buses)	5	Ford F-450 chassis; Assigned to Suffolk Bus Corp.; Displaced from SCAT paratransit service and retrofitted for fixed-route service to replace some of the 2017 ARBOC Spirit of Mobility bus fleet; 2020 Models
	2026	New Flyer	Xcelsior XDE35	35 ft	7201-7292 (92 buses)	37 (under delivery)	7201-7239 are delivered. Last updated as of 11/19/26.; 7201, 7208, 7209, 7211-7213, 7215, 7217, 7218, 7220-7232 assigned to Suffolk Bus Corp.; 7202-7207, 7214, 7216, 7219, 7233-7239 assigned to EBT, Inc; 7210 assigned to Sunrise Coach Lines, Inc.; 7224 OOS after being involved in a MVA on 11/19/26; 7201 out of service for an unknown reason, currently at the NEBR facility in Ronkonkoma; 2026 delivery of 43 XDE35s are nearing completion, more buses expected in 2027; Replaced most of the remaining 2017 ARBOC Spirit of Mobility bus fleet; Currently replacing the remaining 2010 Orion VII NG and 2020 Coach and Equipment Phoenix ML bus fleets
	2026	New Flyer	Xcelsior XE40 CHARGE	40 ft	9001-9040 (40 buses)	6	9001-9003 assigned to Suffolk Bus Corp.; 9004-9006 assigned to EBT, Inc.; Due to bus configurations, 9004-9006 exclusively run on Route 1; 2026 delivery of 6 XE40s are complete, more buses expected in 2027; Features a special lighthouse wrap design; Replacing the remaining Orion VII NG bus fleet

=== Current On-Demand Fleet ===
Photo	Year	Manufacturer	Model	Length	Fleet number	Number in service	Notes
	2021	Coach and Equipment	Phoenix	20.8 ft	21003, 21008, 21031	3	Ford F-350 chassis; Assigned to Hampton Jitney, Inc.; Displaced from SCAT paratransit service in 2021 when SCT introduced their first On-Demand zone in Southampton, NY
	2023	Coach and Equipment	Phoenix	20.8 ft	23001, 23002-???	2	Ford F-350 chassis; Assigned to Hampton Jitney, Inc.
	2026	Coach and Equipment	Phoenix	26 ft	26008, 26009, 26011, 26013-26016, 26020, 26023, 26029	10	Ford F-450 chassis; Assigned to Suffolk Bus Corp.; Units modified with destination signs

=== Retired Fleet ===
All retired buses prior to 1981 were brought either secondhand by Suffolk County or the bus companies that operated for the county or brought by the operators and then by Suffolk County when they took over bus operations in 1980–1981. Some buses were renumbered after entering service; all fleet numbers listed are the numbers the buses were when they entered service.

Photo	Year	Manufacturer/Model	Length	Fleet number(s)	Year(s) retired	Notes
	19xx	GM TDHxxxx		92, 395, 421, 435, 436		
	19xx	GM TDH4517	35 ft	330, 340 (1st)	1987, 1995	
	1959	GM TDH5106	40 ft	617	1982	Formerly operated by Alert Coach Lines, Metropolitan Suburban Bus Authority (MSBA) and Bee-Line; Preserved by the Metropolitan Transportation Authority (MTA)
	1960	GM TDH4517	35 ft	420		Formerly operated by Steinway Transit Corportation and Babylon Transit
	1960	GM TDH5302	40 ft	371		
	1961	GM TDH4517	35 ft	106		
	1962	GM TDH5301	40 ft	409		
	1963	GM TDH4519	35 ft	527	1987	Ex-Suffolk Bus Corp.; Exx-Utica Transit Corporation
	1964	GM TDH5304	40 ft	158		
	1964	GM TDH4519	35 ft	837	1987	
	1965	GM TDH4519	35 ft	292-294, 840	1987, 1995	
	1966	GM TDH4519	35 ft	108, 111, 700	1982	
	1967	GM TDH4519	35 ft	104, 105	1995	
	1969	GM T6H4521	35 ft	517, 528	1986, 1995	
	1973	GM T6H4523A	35 ft	904, 909, 917, 921, 924		
	1974	GM T6H4523A	35 ft	124		
	1975	Flxible 45096-6-1	35 ft	14, 15, 828, 829, 836	1986, 1993, 1995	
	1981	New Flyer D901A 10235C	35 ft	108-115, 119-120, 550-557, 800-806	1986, 1993, 1995	
	1982	Gillig Phantom 3596T6V92	35 ft	5, 7-13, 118-125, 125-127, 209, 558-562, 815-820	1986, 1993	Operators: Alert Coach Lines, Bornscheuer Bus Company, CBS Lines Inc, Inter-County Motor Coach, Louis A. Fuoco Bus Line, Suffolk Bus Corp, Sunrise Coach Lines Inc
	1982	Chance RT-52	25.11 ft	1-4, 6, 20-22, 113-117, 121-124, 210-214, 807-814, 810-814	1986, 1993, 1995	
	1986	Gillig Phantom 35102TB6V92	35 ft	701-702, 710, 740-742, 750-759	1995, 1999, 2005	Operators: Alert Coach Lines, EBT Inc., Inter-County Motor Coach, Suffolk Bus Corp., Sunrise Coaches Inc.; 701-702 renumbered to 1970-1971; 720-733 renumbered to 8720-8733
	1987	Gillig Phantom 35102TB6V92	35 ft	703-704, 760	1995, 1999, 2005	Operators: Alert Coach Lines, EBT Inc., Inter-County Motor Coach, Suffolk Bus Corp., Sunrise Coaches Inc.; 701-702 renumbered to 1970-1971; 720-733 renumbered to 8720-8733
	1988	Chance RT-52	25.11 ft	300-303, 320, 321, 340 (2nd), 341, 350-352, 880-884	1997	
	1991	Gillig Phantom 40102TB6V92TA	40 ft	900, 910-916	2005	1991 Gillig Phantom operators: CBS Lines Inc, EBT Inc, Suffolk Bus Corp.; 900 renumbered to 9100; 901-908 renumbered to 9101-9108; Replaced by the 2005 Gillig Phantom bus fleet
	1991	Gillig Phantom 35102TB6V92TA	35 ft	901-908, 920, 930-934, 940-941	2005	1991 Gillig Phantom operators: CBS Lines Inc, EBT Inc, Suffolk Bus Corp.; 900 renumbered to 9100; 901-908 renumbered to 9101-9108; Replaced by the 2005 Gillig Phantom bus fleet
	1993	Flxible Metro D 30096-6-T	30 ft	9301-9303, 9311-9316, 9321-9326, 9331-9342	2005	1991 Gillig Phantom operators: CBS Lines Inc, EBT Inc, Suffolk Bus Corp.; 900 renumbered to 9100; 901-908 renumbered to 9101-9108; Replaced by the 2005 Gillig Phantom bus fleet
	1996	Gillig Phantom 35102TBS50	35 ft	9600-9617, 9620, 9630-9636, 9641-9655, 9660-9661	1999, 2010	Operators: CBS Lines Inc., EBT Inc., The Blue Coach Lines, Inter-County Motor Coach, Suffolk Bus Corp., Sunrise Coaches Inc.; Replaced by the 2010 Orion VII NG bus fleet
	1997	Gillig Phantom 30096TBS50	30 ft	9701, 9702, 9711-9714, 9721-9726, 9731-9734	2010	Operators: CBS Lines Inc., EBT Inc., Inter-County Motor Coach, Suffolk Bus Corp.; Replaced by the 2010 Orion VII NG bus fleet
	1999	Orion V 05.503	35 ft	9901-9942	2010, 2017	Operators: CBS Lines Inc, EBT Inc., Inter-County Motor Coach, Suffolk Bus Corp.; Introduced the new and current wrap used on all present SCT buses; Multiple were replaced by the 2010 Orion VII NG and 2017 New Flyer Xcelsior bus fleets
	2000	Gillig Phantom C20B102N4 Suburban	35 ft	2000-2005	2011, 2014, 2017	Frequently used on the former S110 Suffolk Clipper route
	2005	Gillig Phantom C21B102N4	35 ft	5001-5016, 5021-5034, 5041-5042, 5051-5060, 5071-5081, 5091-5096	2017-2019	Multiple were replaced by the 2017 ARBOC Spirit of Mobility and 2019 New Flyer Xcelsior bus fleets
	2008	Gillig BRT Hybrid	41 ft	8001-8004	2020, 2021	Operated by EBT, Inc.; Frequently used on the former S1 route; Replaced by 2020 New Flyer XDE40 units 7057-7060
	2010	Starcraft Starlite		2947, 2948		Ford E-450 chassis; Operator: Suffolk Bus Corp.; Transferred over from SCAT paratransit service to fixed-route service sometime around 2015 and 2016; Frequently used on the former 7A and S76 routes
	2010	DaimlerChrysler North America; Orion VII Next Generation 07.501	40.5 ft	1010, 1012-1015	2017, 2026	1012-1015 replaced by the 2017 New Flyer Xcelsior bus fleet; Remaining active units soon to be replaced by the 2026-27 New Flyer Xcelsior bus delivery
	2010	DaimlerChrysler North America; Orion VII Next Generation 07.502	35 ft	1017, 1019, 1020, 1023, 1027-1036, 1039, 1042, 1043, 1045-1047, 1050-1052, 1054, 1057, 1058, 1063-1065	2012, 2017-2026	1034 burned down from a fire prior to 2017; 1054 burned down from a fire in 2012; 1045 involved in a MVA on 10/5/2025 in Hauppauge; 1046 involved in a MVA in Babylon in 2019; 1051 burned down from a fire in South Huntington in 2023; Multiple were replaced by the 2026 New Flyer Xcelsior buses
	2010	DaimlerChrysler North America; Orion VII Next Generation 07.503	32.5 ft	1066, 1068, 1069, 1072, 1074, 1076-1081	2018	Remaining active units soon to be replaced by the 2026-27 New Flyer Xcelsior bus delivery
	2017	New Flyer Xcelsior XDE35	35 ft	7018	2026	Suffered severe rear damage after being involved in a fire on 7/22/2026 in Huntington; Currently being used for parts; Replaced by a new 2026 New Flyer XDE35 bus
	2017	ARBOC Spirit of Mobility	29 ft	7101-7109, 7111-7126, 7128-7136, 7138-7140	2018-2020, 2024-2026	Chevrolet Express G4500 chassis; Replaced the remaining 2005 Gillig Phantom bus fleet during 2017 and 2018; 7115 retired prematurely from an electrical fire; 7130 suffered severe front damage from an accident on 5/16/2018 in Patchogue; Multiple were replaced by several retrofitted 2020 Coach and Equipment Phoenix minibuses (Former SCAT buses) and 2026 New Flyer Xcelsior buses
	2020	Coach and Equipment Phoenix	20.8 ft	20001-20003	2026	Ford E-350 chassis; Displaced from SCAT paratransit service and retrofitted for fixed-route service to replace some of the 2017 ARBOC Spirit of Mobility bus fleet during late 2024 and in 2025; 20001 and 20003 were both spare units for EBT, Inc. in July 2026; EBT, Inc. is the first operator to use the incoming delivery of 2026 New Flyer Xcelsior buses to immediately get rid of the new minibus fleet due to complaints of overcrowding on multiple routes; Remaining active units soon to be replaced by the 2026-27 New Flyer Xcelsior bus delivery

== Routes ==
Effective October 29, 2023, the Suffolk County Transit Redesign removed the "S" prefix from all routes.

== Suffolk County Accessible Transportation ==
Suffolk County Accessible Transportation (SCAT) is Suffolk County Transit's federally mandated paratransit service for ADA-eligible passengers with disabilities.

=== Overview ===
SCAT service is available Monday through Friday, 6:00 AM to 10:00 PM, Saturday 6:00 AM to 9:00 PM, and Sunday 6:00 AM to 8:00 PM. The fare for an ADA eligible rider is $4.00. When that rider is accompanied by a personal care attendant (PCA), that PCA does not pay a fare, but must have the same origin and destination as the rider. If riders choose to travel with companions not a PCA, that person must pay the fare of $4.00.

== See also ==
- Transportation on Long Island
- Huntington Area Rapid Transit
- Nassau Inter-County Express
