= Central Islip State Hospital Powerplant =

Coordinates: 40.77410°N 73.18938°W

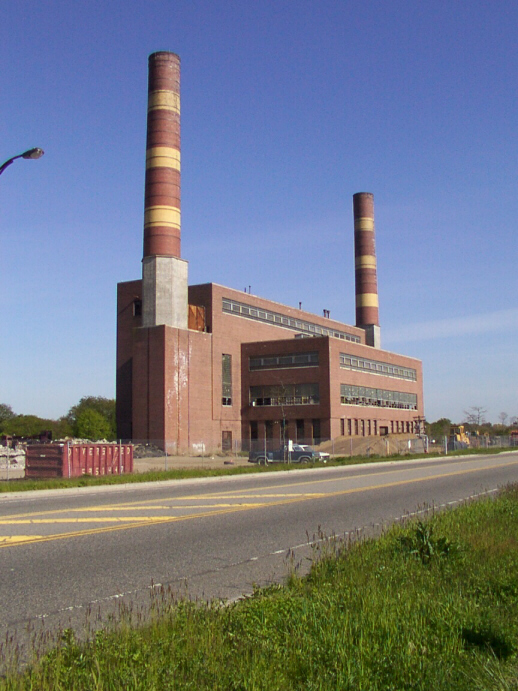
The CISH Powerplant, seen in 2006

The Central Islip State Hospital Powerplant (also known as Building Number 101 and colloquially as The Powerhouse) was a power station at the Central Islip Psychiatric Center in Central Islip, Suffolk County, New York, United States.

== Description ==
The Central Islip State Hospital Powerplant was constructed to meet the rising electrical demands of the expanding psychiatric facility located in Central Islip, New York on Long Island. It was constructed in 1953 by the Titusville Iron Works Co. and the Interboro Co.

The power plant utilized 3 large turbine generators driven by steam created in 6 water tube boilers heated by coal, then eventually oil. Both fuels were delivered by freight train. The steam that spun the generators was then funneled through a system of pipes housed in underground cement corridors to the various buildings on the psychiatric grounds for district heating. It was the last of three power plants constructed on the psychiatric facility grounds and by far, the largest.

In the mid-1970s, a World War II Sherman Tank was discovered buried south of the plant.

As deinstitutionalizing progressed across the United States and commercial power plants on Long Island emerged, the CISH Powerplant was eventually relegated to the role of an electrical distribution hub for externally supplied electricity to the few remaining psychiatric buildings still in use.

In 1996, The Central Islip State Hospital was closed down and the property and buildings were sold to New York Institute of Technology (NYIT).

NYIT sold off the property on which the CISH Powerplant resided – and, in 2006, it was demolished to make room for condominiums.

== See also ==
- Richard M. Flynn Power Plant
