= List of museums in Newfoundland and Labrador =

This list of museums in Newfoundland and Labrador contains museums which are defined for this context as institutions (including nonprofit organizations, government entities, and private businesses) that collect and care for objects of cultural, artistic, scientific, or historical interest and make their collections or related exhibits available for public viewing. Also included are non-profit art galleries and university art galleries. Museums that exist only in cyberspace (i.e., virtual museums) are not included.

Name	Town/City	Region	Type	Summary
Abbott's Wildlife Museum	Bonavista	Bonavista Peninsula	Natural history	information
Admiralty House Museum	Mount Pearl		History	Local history, wireless communication and Guglielmo Marconi, the tragedy of the S.S. Florizel and other shipwrecks and maritime artifacts
Banting Interpretation Center	Musgrave Harbour		History	website, life of Sir Frederick Banting, co-discoverer of insulin, who was killed in a local 1941 airplane crash
Barbour Heritage Village	Newtown		Open air	website, includes a schoolhouse, sealing interpretation center, fisherman's stage, theatre, art gallery, and visitor reception center
Battle Harbour Heritage Properties	Battle Harbour	Labrador	Open air	website, restored salt fish premises and community
Beaches Heritage Centre	Eastport	Eastport Peninsula	Art	website, arts centre with art gallery, theater
Beckett Heritage House	Old Perlican	Avalon Peninsula	Historic house	information, mid-19th century - mid-20th century fishery homestead
Bell Island Mine Museum	Bell Island	Avalon Peninsula	Mining	website, artifacts, equipment and tour of iron ore mine
Blackhead One Room School and Church Museum	St. John's		History	information, open by appointment, 1879 chapel that was originally constructed as a one-room school
Bird Cove Interpretation Centre	Bird Cove	Great Northern Peninsula	History	website, local history including pre-historic cultures, explorers and settlers
Bleak House Museum	Fogo		History	information, local history; built 1826-1827 as a merchant family house
Bonavista North Museum & Gallery	Wesleyville	Bonavista Peninsula	Multiple	website, local history, contemporary art gallery
Boyd's Cove Beothuk Interpretation Centre	Boyd's Cove		First Nations	website, archeological artifacts and exhibits about the Beothuk settlers
Burin Heritage Museums	Burin	Burin Peninsula	Multiple	information, includes 1910 Bank of Nova Scotia Museum with local history and culture exhibits, 1920 Reddy Heritage House with period furnishings and the Burin Cottage Hospital Exhibit
Cape Bonavista Lighthouse	Bonavista	Bonavista Peninsula	Maritime	website, lighthouse technology and lightkeepers' lifestyles
Cape Spear Lighthouse National Historic Site	Cape Spear	Avalon Peninsula	Maritime	Lighthouse and 1939 period keeper's residence
Carbonear Railway Station Museum	Carbonear	Avalon Peninsula	History	website, local history
Castle Hill National Historic Site	Placentia	Avalon Peninsula	History	Fort ruins, exhibits on the fort and the fishing village
Christopher Pratt Art Gallery	Bay Roberts	Avalon Peninsula	Art	website, located in the Western Union Cable Station building, works by artist Christopher Pratt and changing exhibits
Colony of Avalon Interpretation Centre	Ferryland	Avalon Peninsula	Archaeology	website, history and artifacts from the Province of Avalon, reproduction 17th century room with kitchen, archaeology dig site
Commissariat House	St. John's		Historic house	website, 1830s period house built to supply the city's garrison
Conception Bay Museum	Harbour Grace	Avalon Peninsula	History	website, local history, pirates, aviation
Cupids Museum	Cupids	Avalon Peninsula	History	website, local history and culture
Demasduit Regional Museum	Grand Falls-Windsor		Multiple	website, local history, artifacts and culture of the Beothuk and other are settlers; branch of The Rooms. Formerly Mary March Provincial Museum.
Dildo Area Interpretation Centre	Dildo	Avalon Peninsula	History	information, local history, archaeological artifacts from Maritime Archaic Indians, Dorset Eskimo, recent Indians and Beothuk; interpretation of the 19th Century cod fish hatchery
Dr. Henry N Payne Community Museum	Cow Head	Great Northern Peninsula	History	website, local history and culture
Durrell Museum	Durrell		History	Local history
Fishermen's Museum	Port de Grave	Avalon Peninsula	Multiple	website, includes exhibits on life and work of the Newfoundland inshore fisherman, Porter House, a typical fisherman's home, and a one-room school
Flambro Head Museum and Café	Job's Cove	Avalon Peninsula	History	information, local history
Fluvarium	St. John's		Natural history	Freshwater ecosystems
French Shore Interpretation Centre	Conche	Great Northern Peninsula	History	website, area history and culture, artifacts from shipwrecks
Gateway Labrador	Labrador City	Labrador	History	website, local history including aboriginal inhabitants, fur trading pioneers, mining, railroads, hydropower
Glovertown Museum	Glovertown		History	local history
Green Family Forge	Trinity	Avalon Peninsula	History	website, historic working blacksmith shop
Grenfell Campus Art Gallery	Corner Brook		Art	website, part of Grenfell Campus, Memorial University
Hawthorne Cottage National Historic Site	Brigus	Avalon Peninsula	Historic house	19th century period home of Arctic explorer Bob Bartlett, exhibits about his life and travels
Heart's Content Cable Station	Heart's Content	Avalon Peninsula	Media	website, information, site of the end of Cyrus West Field's first Transatlantic telegraph cable
Hiscock House	Trinity	Avalon Peninsula	Historic house	website, 1910 period house
Hopedale Mission National Historic Site	Hopedale	Labrador	History	information, information, local history, Moravian and Inuit artifacts from the 19th century
James J. O'Mara Pharmacy Museum	St. John's		Medical	website, operated by the Newfoundland and Labrador Pharmacy Board, 1895 drug store with equipment
Johnson Geo Centre	St. John's		Natural history	Geology of the earth and the province, including volcanoes, earthquakes, rainstorms, climate changes, impact on humans
Labrador Heritage Museum	North West River	Labrador	History	information, local history
Labrador Interpretation Centre	North West River	Labrador	First Nations	website, founding peoples of Labrador, including Innu, Inuit, Metis and settlers; branch of The Rooms
Labrador Military Museum	Happy Valley-Goose Bay	Labrador	Aviation	information, items from the Canadian, American, Dutch, German, and British Air Forces
Labrador Straits Museum	L'Anse-au-Loup	Labrador	History	website, local history with a focus on domestic life and the role of women in communities
Lamaline Heritage Museum	Lamaline	Burin Peninsula	History	website, local history, 1929 tidal wave disaster
L'Anse aux Meadows National Historic Site	L'Anse aux Meadows	Great Northern Peninsula	Living	Reconstructions of three Norse buildings, archaeological remains
Lawn Heritage Museum	Lawn	Burin Peninsula	History	website, local history
Lester-Garland House	Trinity	Avalon Peninsula	Historic house	website, reconstructed 1819/1820 period brick house
Lifestyles Museum and Cooperage	Victoria	Avalon Peninsula	History	website, information, blacksmith and cooper tools and equipment
Loder's Point Premises	St. Lewis	Labrador	History	information, local history and fishing industry heritage
Logger's Life Provincial Museum	Grand Falls-Windsor		Forestry	website, recreated 1920s logging camp; branch of The Rooms
Mockbeggar Plantation	Bonavista	Bonavista Peninsula	Industry	website, 1939 period fishing plantation house, fish store, carpentry shop, cod liver oil factory
Musgrave Harbour Fisherman's Museum	Musgrave Harbour		Maritime	website, fishing industry artifacts
Net Loft Museum	Rigolet	Labrador	History	information, information, local history, tools and equipment of the fishing industry
Newfoundland Insectarium	Reidville		Natural history	Mounted and live insect displays
Newfoundland Power Electrical Museum	Victoria	Avalon Peninsula	Technology	information, former hydro power station and replica sawmill
Norstead: A Viking Village and Port of Trade	L'Anse aux Meadows	Great Northern Peninsula	Living	Viking era port of trade village
North Atlantic Aviation Museum	Gander		Aviation	Historic aircraft and the history of aviation in the province
Point Amour Lighthouse	L'Anse Amour	Labrador	Maritime	Mid 19th-century lighthouse, exhibits on the maritime history of the Labrador Straits
Pouch Cove Museum	Pouch Cove	Avalon Peninsula	Technology	website, local history
Provincial Seamen's Museum	Grand Bank	Burin Peninsula	Maritime	website, fishing industry and life along the coast; branch of The Rooms
Quidi Vidi Battery	St. John's		Military	website, artillery battery during the War of 1812
Railway Coastal Museum	St. John's		Railway	
Red Bay Community Museum	Red Bay	Labrador	History	website, local history
Red Bay National Historic Site	Red Bay	Labrador	History	website, information, information, 16th century whaling artifacts, archaeological finds
Road to Yesterday Museum	Bay Roberts	Avalon Peninsula	History	website, turn-of-the-20th-century store and business displays, local history, located in the Western Union Cable Station building
The Rooms	St. John's		Multiple	Includes the Rooms Art Gallery
Rorke Store	Carbonear	Avalon Peninsula	History	website, information, local history of the store, town's people and the fishing industry
Royal Canadian Legion Military Museum	Grand Falls-Windsor		Military	information, information, operated by the Royal Canadian Legion Branch 12
Royal Newfoundland Constabulary Police Museum	St. John's		Law enforcement	website, open by appointment
Royal Newfoundland Regiment Museum	Pleasantville		Military	information, history of the Royal Newfoundland Regiment
Ryan Premises National Historic Site	Bonavista	Bonavista Peninsula	Open air	website, restored merchant's premises with exhibits about: inshore, Labrador, international and seal fisheries; traditional Newfoundland outport furniture; local history museum about the inshore fishing community
Signal Hill National Historic Site	St. John's		Multiple	Exhibits about the fort site and a Marconi wireless station
Torbay Museum	Torbay	Avalon Peninsula	History	website, local history
Trinity Interpretation Centre	Trinity	Avalon Peninsula	History	website, local history
Trinity Museum	Trinity	Avalon Peninsula	History	website, local history
Twillingate Museum	Twillingate		History	Local history and culture
Whitbourne Heritage Museum	Whitbourne	Avalon Peninsula	History	information, local history
White Elephant Museum	Makkovik	Labrador	History	website, local history
Willow Tree Museum	Hant's Harbour	Avalon Peninsula	History	information, information, local history
Winterton Boat Building Museum	Winterton	Avalon Peninsula	Maritime	website
Wireless Relay and Interpretation Centre	Fogo		History	information, local history, in particular the old Fogo wireless station
Ye Matthew Legacy	Bonavista	Bonavista Peninsula	Maritime	website, i5th Century replica of John Cabot's ship Matthew, exhibits about his voyage to Newfoundland
