= Insectarium =

Zoo, museum, or exhibit of live insects

An insectarium is a live insect zoo, or a museum or exhibit of live insects. Insectariums often display a variety of insects and similar arthropods, such as spiders, beetles, cockroaches, ants, bees, millipedes, centipedes, crickets, grasshoppers, stick insects, scorpions, mantises and woodlice. Displays can focus on learning about insects, types of insects, their habitats, why they are important, and the work of entomologists, arachnologists, and other scientists that study terrestrial arthropods and similar animals.

== Overview ==
Some insectariums may include museum displays of mounted insects and exhibits about insects.

A butterfly house is a type of insectarium that specializes in live butterflies and moths. In addition, there are seasonal butterfly gardens on display at many zoos, botanical gardens, nature centers, natural history museums, and science museums.

== List of insectariums ==
Public insectariums or insect zoos include:

=== Africa ===
- Algiers Insectarium, Algiers, Algeria

=== Asia ===
- Bangkok Butterfly Garden and Insectarium, Bangkok, Thailand
- Entopia (formerly Penang Butterfly Farm),(Penang, Malaysia)
- Gunma Insect World, Kiryū, Gunma, Japan
- Insect Science Museum, Taipei, Taiwan

=== Australia ===
- Insectarium of Victoria, (Victoria, Australia)

=== Europe ===
- Insektariumas (Lithuania, Palanga)
- Stratford Butterfly Farm, Stratford-upon-Avon, England
- Esapolis, The largest insectarium in the province of Padova, Padova, Italy

=== North America ===
==== Canada ====
- Montreal Insectarium, Montréal
- Newfoundland Insectarium, Reidville, NL
- Victoria Bug Zoo, Victoria, BC
- Victoria Butterfly Gardens, Victoria, BC

==== United States ====
- Audubon Insectarium, New Orleans, Louisiana
- Bayer Insectarium at the Museum of Life and Science, Durham, North Carolina
- Bohart Museum of Entomology, Davis, California
- Bugarium, ABQ BioPark Botanic Garden, Albuquerque, New Mexico
- Butterfly Pavilion, Westminster, Colorado
- Cincinnati Zoo and Botanical Garden, World of the Insect, Cincinnati, Ohio
- Dancing Wings Butterfly Garden, Strong National Museum of Play, Rochester, New York
- Henry Doorly Zoo, Butterfly and Insect Pavilion, Omaha, Nebraska
- Houston Museum of Natural Science, Brown Hall of Entomology, Houston, Texas
- Insect Adventure, Stillwater, Oklahoma
- Butterfly Biosphere Thanksgiving Point, Lehi, Utah
- The Insectarium, Philadelphia, Pennsylvania
- Monsanto Insectarium, St. Louis, Missouri
- O. Orkin Insect Zoo, Washington, D.C.
- Ralph M. Parsons Discovery Center and Insect Zoo, Los Angeles, California
- InsectZoo, San Francisco, California
- Detroit Zoo, Wildlife interpretive gallery (aviary, and butterfly garden), Detroit,
- Portland Insectarium, Portland, Oregon
- Long Island Aquarium, Riverhead, New York

== See also ==
- Formicarium
