= Norstead =

Norstead may refer to:

- Norstead (Newfoundland), a reconstructed Viking-age village and port near L'Anse aux Meadows National Historic Site, Newfoundland and Labrador, Canada
- Norstead (Missouri), a former reconstructed Viking-age farm settlement in Northern Missouri, United States
