= Calverton station =

Former train station in New York, US

Calverton
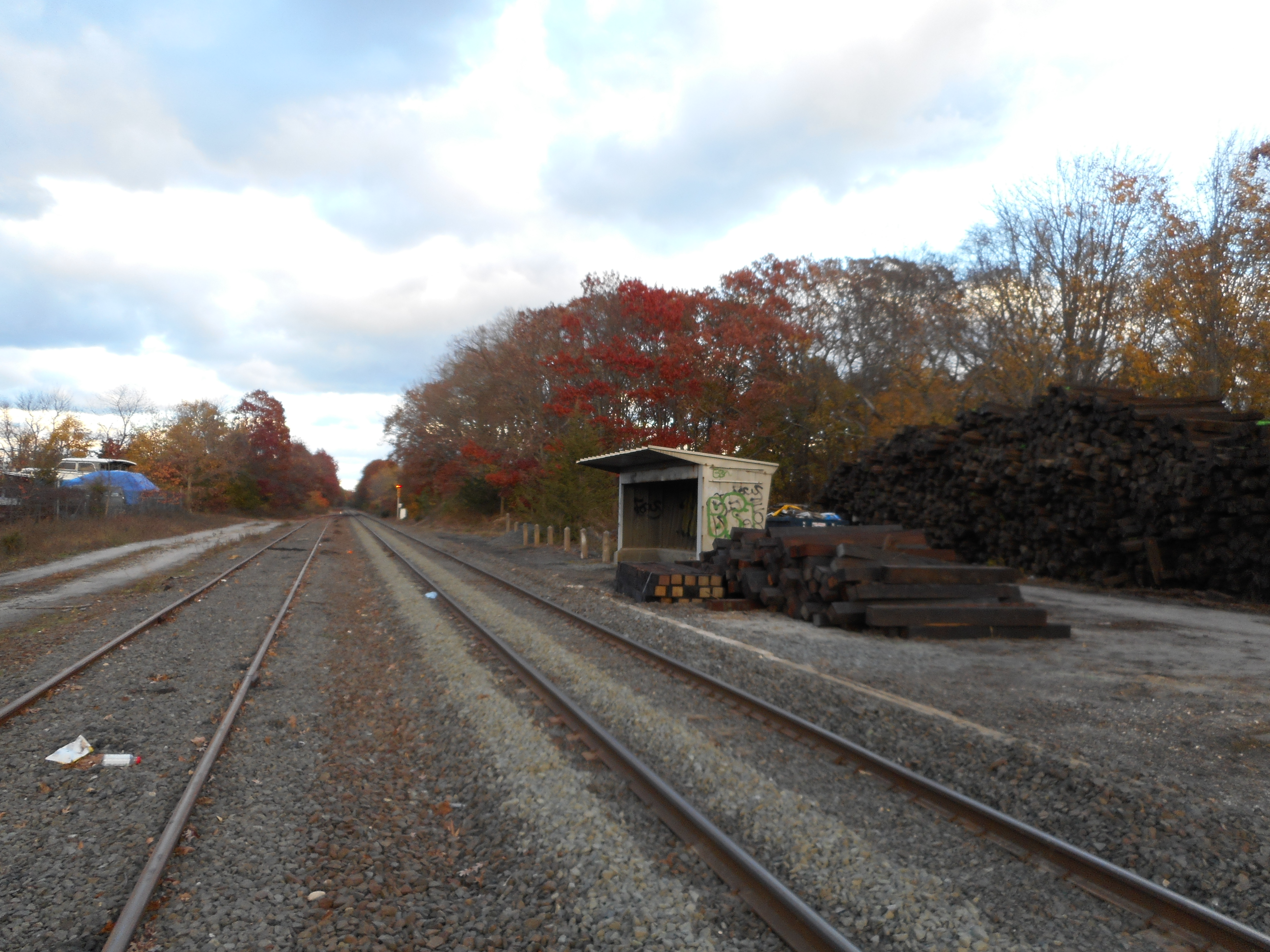
- The former Calverton LIRR station on November 14, 2014.

General information
- Location: Edwards and Railroad Avenues; Calverton, New York
- Coordinates: 40.908794°N 72.743343°W
- Owner: Long Island Rail Road
- Line: Main Line
- Platforms: 1
- Tracks: 2

History
- Opened: 1880
- Closed: 1981
- Former names: Baiting Hollow (1880–1897)

Services
Preceding station	Long Island Rail Road	Following station
Manorville toward Ronkonkoma	Ronkonkoma Branch Greenport Branch	Riverhead toward Ronkonkoma
Preceding station	Long Island Rail Road	Following station
Manorville toward Long Island City or Penn Station	Main Line	Riverhead toward Greenport
Location

Calverton was a station stop along the Greenport Branch of the Long Island Rail Road in Calverton, New York. The station was built in 1880 and closed in 1981.

== History ==
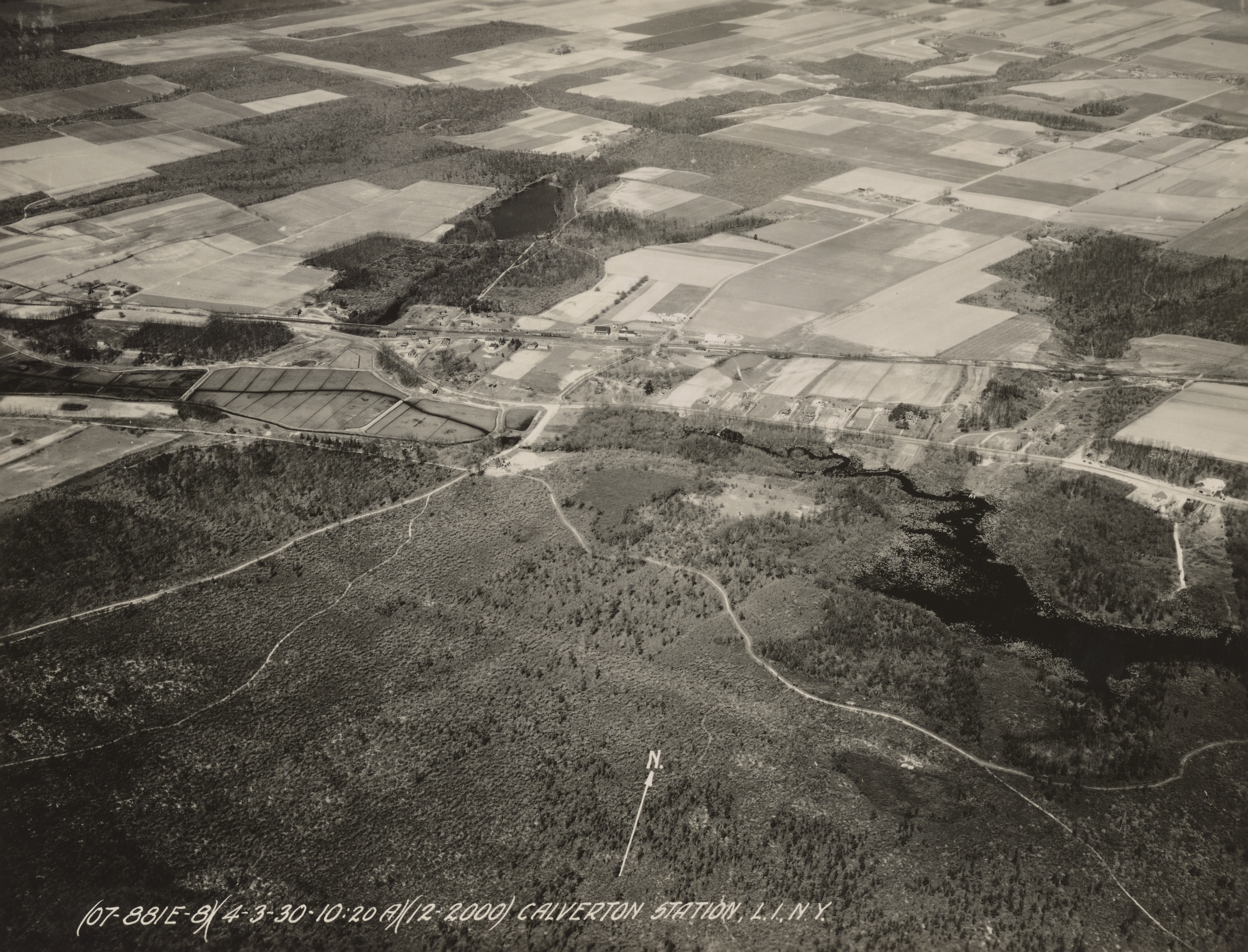
Aerial view of the stop & the surrounding area in 1931

Calverton station was originally built around 1880 as Baiting Hollow. It was also intended to be the terminus of one of two formerly proposed extensions of the Wading River Branch. The depot closed and moved to undisclosed location around 1922 and second depot built further east around same year, which was located on Railroad Avenue between North River Road and Edwards Avenue. Calverton was the site of the deadly Golden's Pickle Works wreck on Friday, August 13, 1926. The station closed in 1981. The disused metal station shelter currently remains.

West of the station, a spur to the Naval Weapons Industrial Reserve Plant used by Grumman closed in the early 1990s. In February 2010 plans were announced to reactivate the spur in a $3.5 million rehabilitation for freight trains of the New York and Atlantic Railway to serve an industrial park at the airport. Funds came from the federal stimulus funding. The spur was reopened in 2011 and parallels Connecticut Avenue to the airport.

=== Hulse Turnout ===
At the same spot as Calverton there was a previous station named Hulse Turnout. Hulse Turnout first appeared on the 1852 timetable and was gone by 1858.
