= Aquebogue station =

Former train station in New York, US

Aquebogue
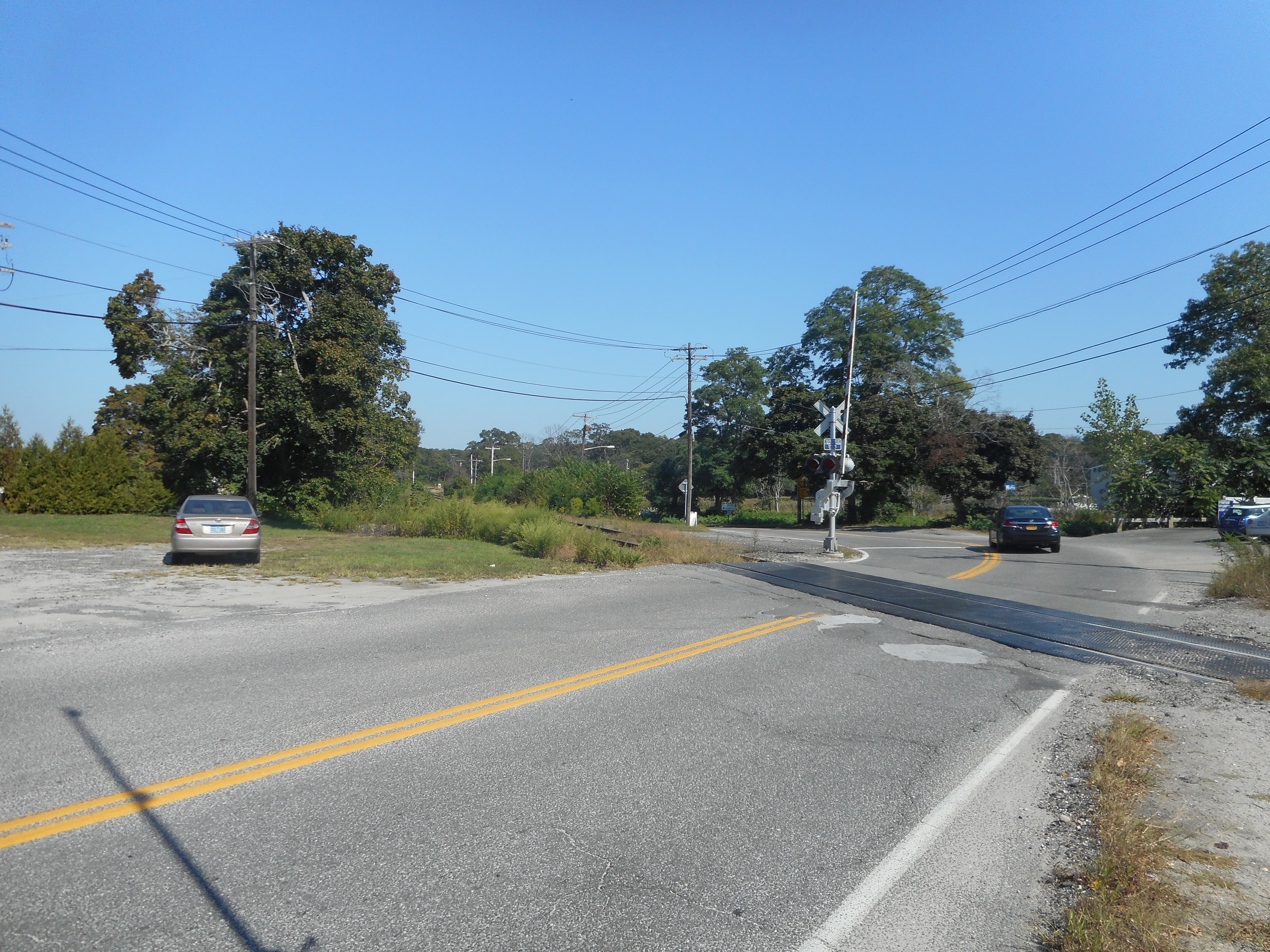
- Former Aquebogue LIRR station

General information
- Location: Meeting House Creek Road, east of Edgar Avenue, Aquebogue, New York
- Coordinates: 40.93864°N 72.62°W
- Owner: Long Island Rail Road
- Line: Main Line
- Platforms: 1
- Tracks: 2

History
- Opened: June 1892
- Closed: July 1967

Former services
Preceding station	Long Island Rail Road	Following station
Riverhead toward Long Island City or Penn Station	Main Line	Jamesport toward Greenport
Location

Aquebogue was a station stop along the Main Line (Greenport Branch) of the Long Island Rail Road in Aquebogue, Suffolk County, New York.

== History ==
Aquebogue first appeared on the June 1892 timetable. Work began in March 1910 and was completed over the summer. An acre of land on the east was bought and filled in to provide a 1400-foot passing track. A new frame station was built in 1911 on the south side of the track opposite the new station. A new depot was erected at Aquebogue in 1910, and was gutted out and remodeled as a shelter shed in 1956, and was finally razed in July 1967.
