= Newfoundland Insectarium =

Insectarium

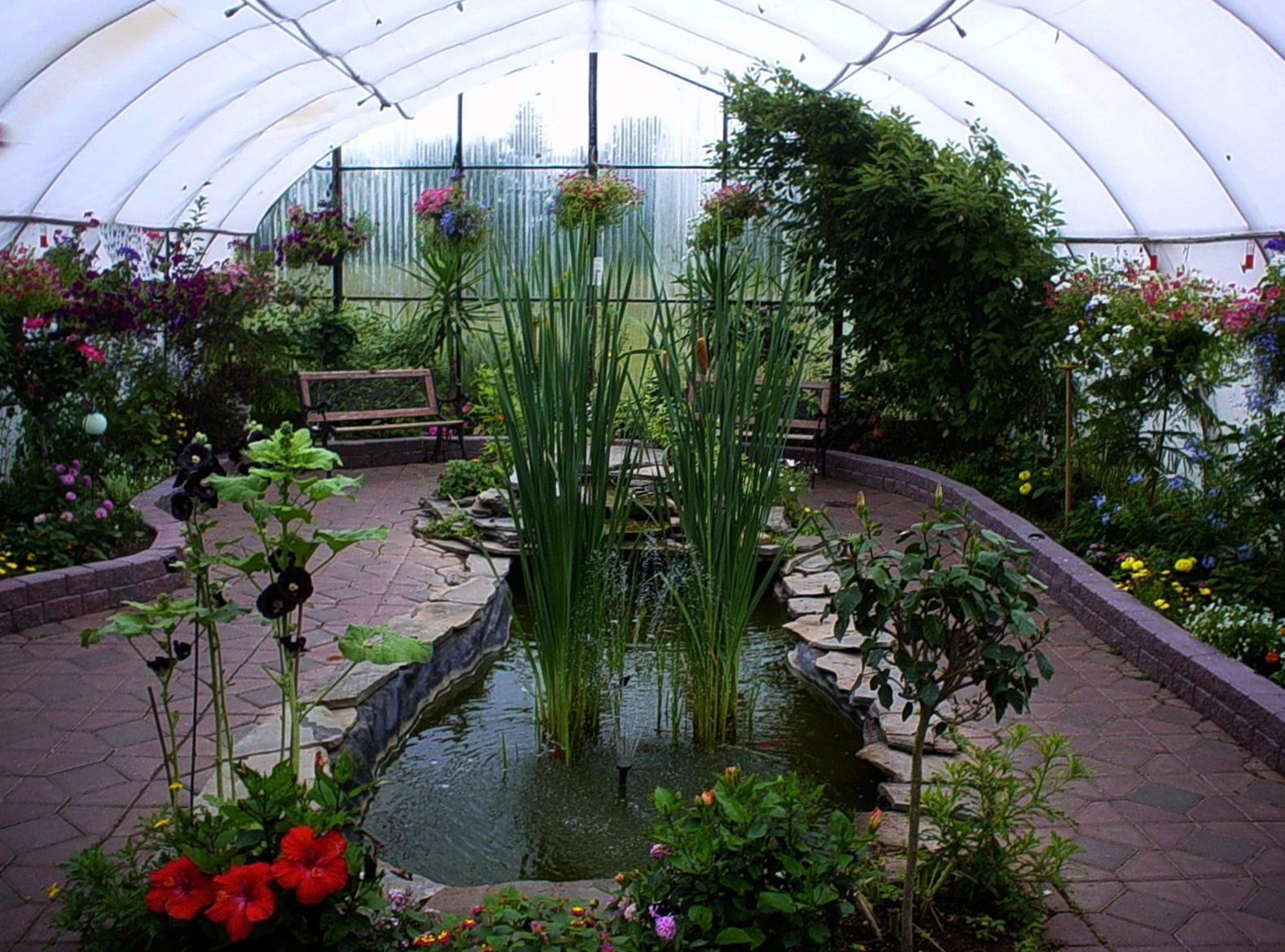
- Interactive map of Newfoundland Insectarium
- 49.194685°N 57.43382°W
- Date opened: 1998
- Location: Reidville, Newfoundland and Labrador, CAN
- Director: Lloyd Hollett
- Website: http://www.nfinsectarium.com/

The Newfoundland Insectarium is an insectarium and museum located in Reidville, Newfoundland and Labrador, Canada.

The main display contains mounted insects from around the world, organized by geographical region. One exhibit covers the insects of Newfoundland and Labrador. Live arthropods are dispersed around the mounted displays, including tarantulas, scorpions, and cockroaches The museum also includes a glass beehive with live honeybees, a leafcutter ant colony, a recently extended 92-foot (28 m) butterfly house and a walking trail.

The Newfoundland Insectarium was founded by Lloyd Hollett and Gary Holloway and opened in 1998. Hollett and his wife now run the Insectarium along with seasonal student employees from May to October.

It is located along Route 430 on the road to Gros Morne National Park. The building itself was formerly a dairy barn and was originally built in 1946.
