= Riverhead station =

Long Island Rail Road station in Suffolk County, New York

Riverhead
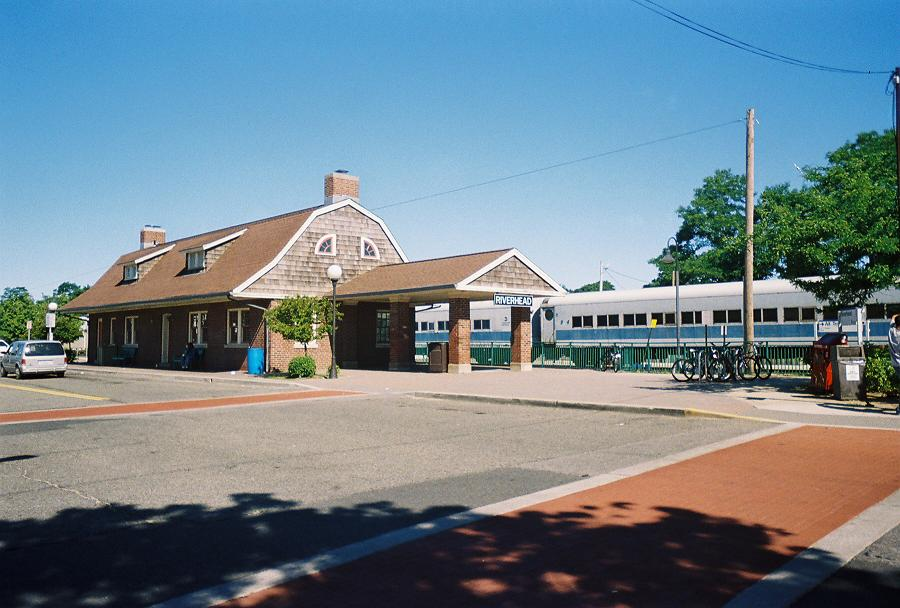
- The historic depot building at the station in July 2007

General information
- Location: Osborne Avenue & Railroad Street; Riverhead, New York
- Coordinates: 40.919763°N 72.6669°W
- Owner: Long Island Rail Road, Town of Riverhead
- Line: Main Line
- Distance: 73.3 mi (118.0 km) from Long Island City
- Platforms: 1 side platform
- Tracks: 5
- Connections: Suffolk County Transit: 58, 62, 66, 80, 92, 495 HOV

Construction
- Parking: Yes; free
- Cycle facilities: Yes; bike racks
- Accessible: Yes

Other information
- Station code: RHD
- Fare zone: 14

History
- Opened: July 29, 1844
- Rebuilt: 1870, 1910
- Former names: River Head

Passengers
- 2012–2014: 75 per weekday

Services
Preceding station	Long Island Rail Road	Following station
Yaphank–BNL toward Ronkonkoma	Ronkonkoma Branch Greenport Branch	Mattituck toward Greenport
Former services
Preceding station	Long Island Rail Road	Following station
Yaphank toward Ronkonkoma	Ronkonkoma Branch Greenport Branch	Mattituck toward Greenport
Preceding station	Long Island Rail Road	Following station
Calverton toward Long Island City or Penn Station	Main Line	Aquebogue toward Greenport
Location

Riverhead is a station along the Main Line (Greenport Branch) of the Long Island Rail Road in Riverhead, Suffolk County, New York. It is located on Osborne Avenue and Railroad Street, north of West Main Street (NY 25) and the Suffolk County Court House. Near the station is the Railroad Museum of Long Island's Riverhead Restoration Site, which features a collection of historic Long Island Rail Road cars and maintenance equipment.

== History ==
Riverhead station was opened on July 29, 1844. The station is listed as River Head in the 1852 timetable. The original station house was moved for use as a railroad bunkhouse in March 1870 and the second depot was opened the same month. Between 1891 and 1969, it contained a turntable, water tower, and pump house. The third depot was opened on June 2, 1910.

When Calverton station closed in 1958 and Aquebogue in the mid-1960s, the Riverhead station began taking in commuters from both stations.

On November 13, 1972, the Riverhead station's agency closed. The station house was thereafter used for signal maintainers until the end of the 20th century.

Riverhead station was restored in 2000–2001 with a high-level side platform and a fourth station house similar to the 1910-built one, and it was sold to the Town of Riverhead in 2001. However, the station house has been closed to the public in response to a rash of vandalism and theft. The station house is owned by the Town of Riverhead, and the MTA uses a high-level platform and other amenities for the station.

== Station layout ==
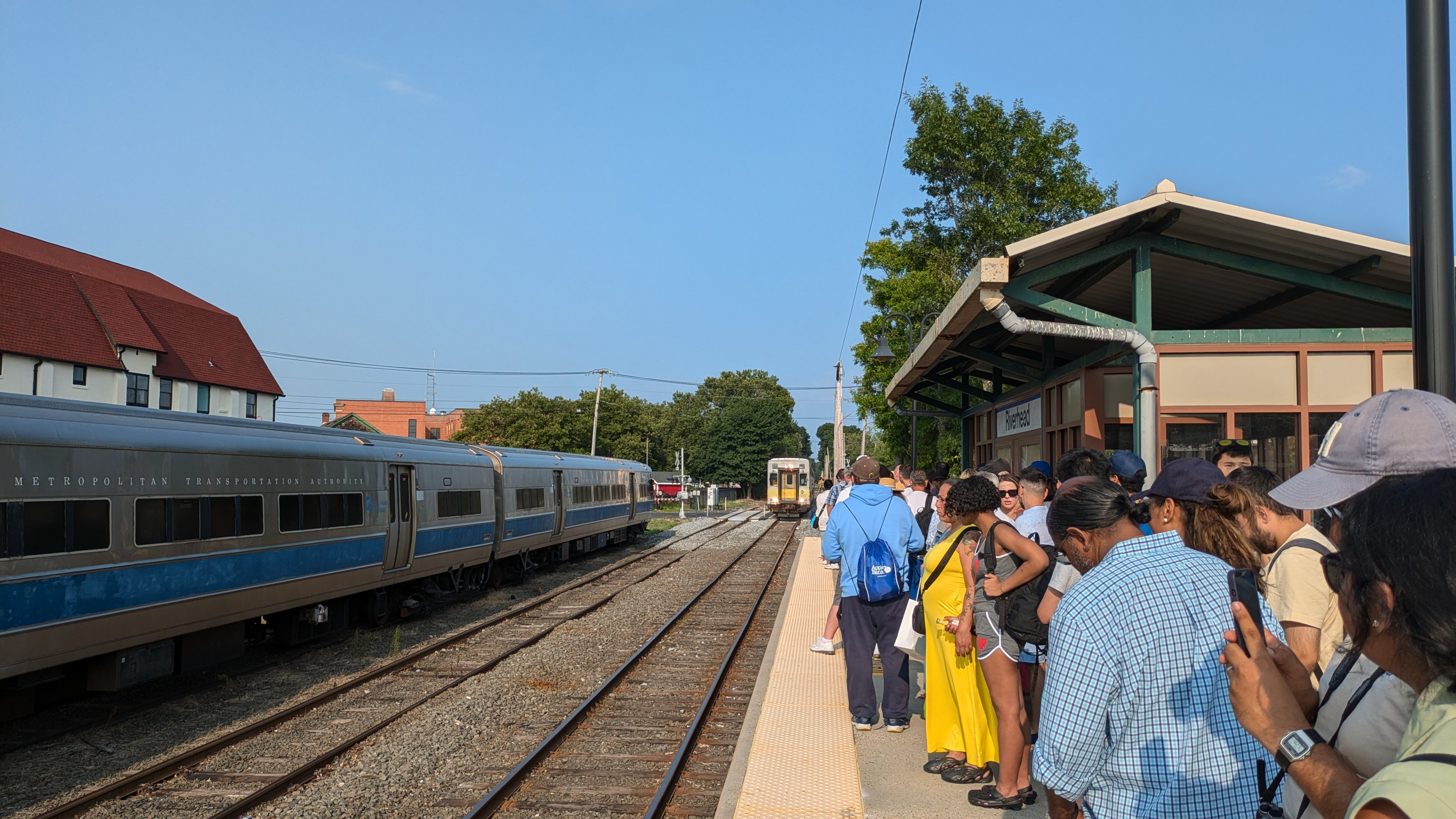
View from the station platform

This station has one high-level side platform south of the tracks that is long enough for one and a half cars to receive and discharge passengers.

The Main Line has two tracks at this location and a small yard with three tracks. The siding track is not used in revenue service, while the yard tracks host rolling stock preserved at the Railroad Museum of Long Island.

=== Parking ===
Free, unrestricted parking is available on the south side of the station. The Riverhead station's parking lot is operated and maintained by the Long Island Rail Road.

== Nearby attractions ==
- Long Island Aquarium
- Railroad Museum of Long Island

== See also ==
- List of Long Island Rail Road stations
- History of the Long Island Rail Road
