= Railroad Museum of Long Island =

Museum in Long Island, New York

Coordinates: 40.920320°N 72.666060°W

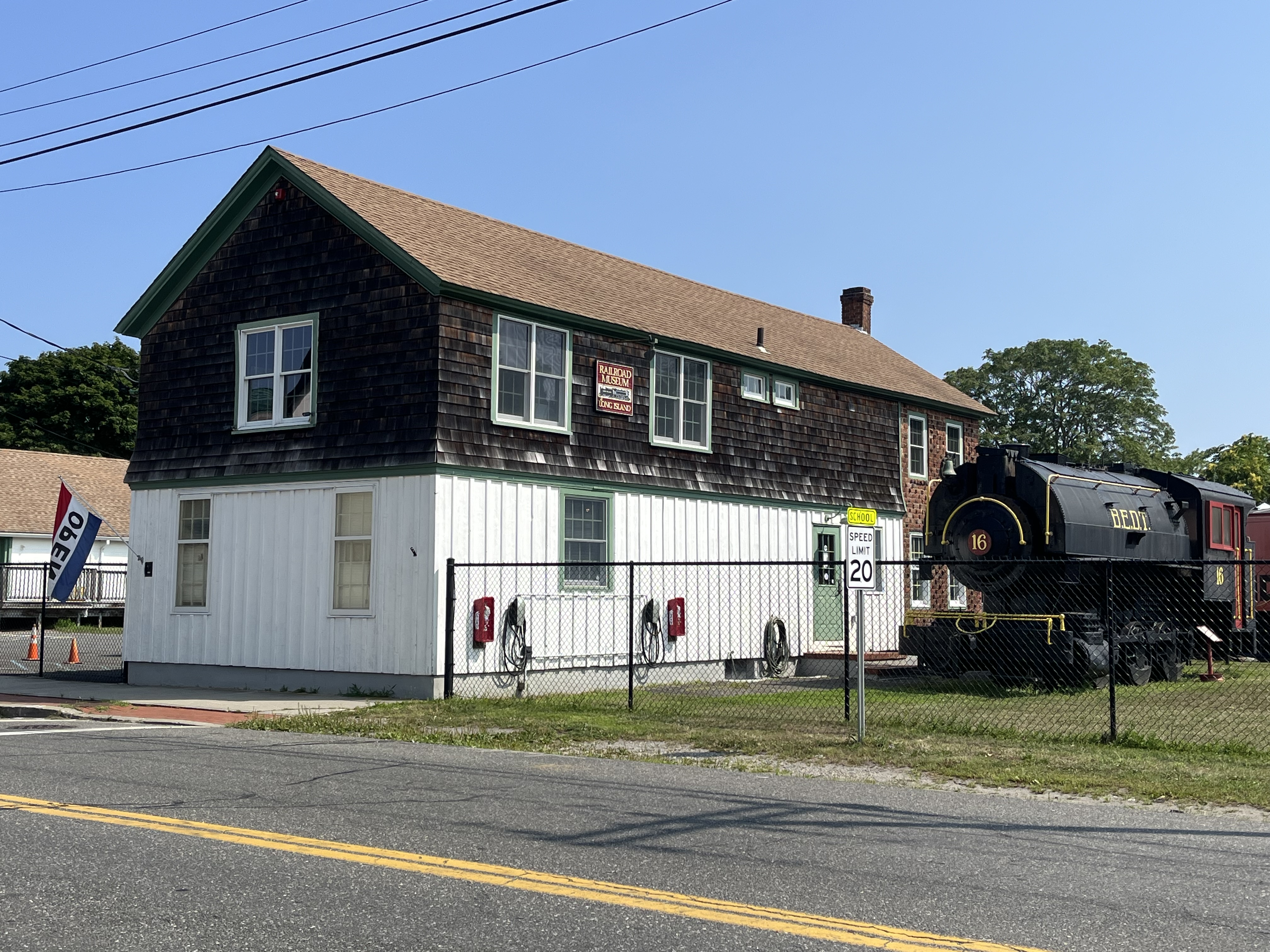
- The Railroad Museum of Long Island's Riverhead location in 2024
- Established: 1990
- Location: Riverhead and Greenport; Suffolk County, New York; United States
- Type: Railway museum
- Founders: Railroad Museum of Long Island Members & Engine 39 Committee
- Public transit access: Riverhead & Greenport stations, Long Island Rail Road
- Website: www.rmli.org

The Railroad Museum of Long Island – also known by its reporting mark, RMLI – is a railway museum based on the North Fork of Long Island, in Suffolk County, New York, United States. It has two locations: the main location in Riverhead, and a satellite location in Greenport, west of the North Ferry to Shelter Island. Both facilities contain active model railroad displays and gift shops.

== Riverhead ==
The Riverhead location of the museum is located in a former Nassau–Suffolk Lumber Company warehouse and showroom at 416 Griffing Avenue, east of the Riverhead LIRR station. It was used as a lumber yard as far back as 1885 (the Corwin & Vail Lumber Company), and from 1891 to 1969 contained a turntable, water tower, and pump house (the Long Island Rail Road – Riverhead Yard).

The location contains numerous rare passenger and freight cars as well as locomotives in various stages of restoration, some of which are the last of their kind. It also has a 16" gauge Allan Herschell Park Train riding train from the LIRR Pavilion of the 1964–65 New York World's Fair.

Located in the Freeman North Exhibit Hall, a renovated warehouse on the property, is the Historic Lionel Layout – an "O" Gauge model train layout donated to the museum by Lionel, LLC in 2009. The 14' by 40' trainset is based on the 1940s Lionel Showroom Layout from New York City. It was constructed by Lionel employees in 1992 and operated at Lionel's facilities in Chesterfield, Michigan through 2008.

== Greenport ==
The Greenport RMLI site is located in the former 1892 LIRR freight house of the historic Greenport LIRR Station. Throughout its history, the freight house served as a branch of the United States Post Office, Railway Express Agency, and a storage facility for LIRR Road 'n' Rail buses. Today the station contains a restored 1927 LIRR wooden caboose, a 40' Pacific Car & Foundry boxcar, and a snowplow, "W-83 JAWS", built by the LIRR shop forces – as well as artifacts, photographs, and other items of LIRR history.

== Gallery ==
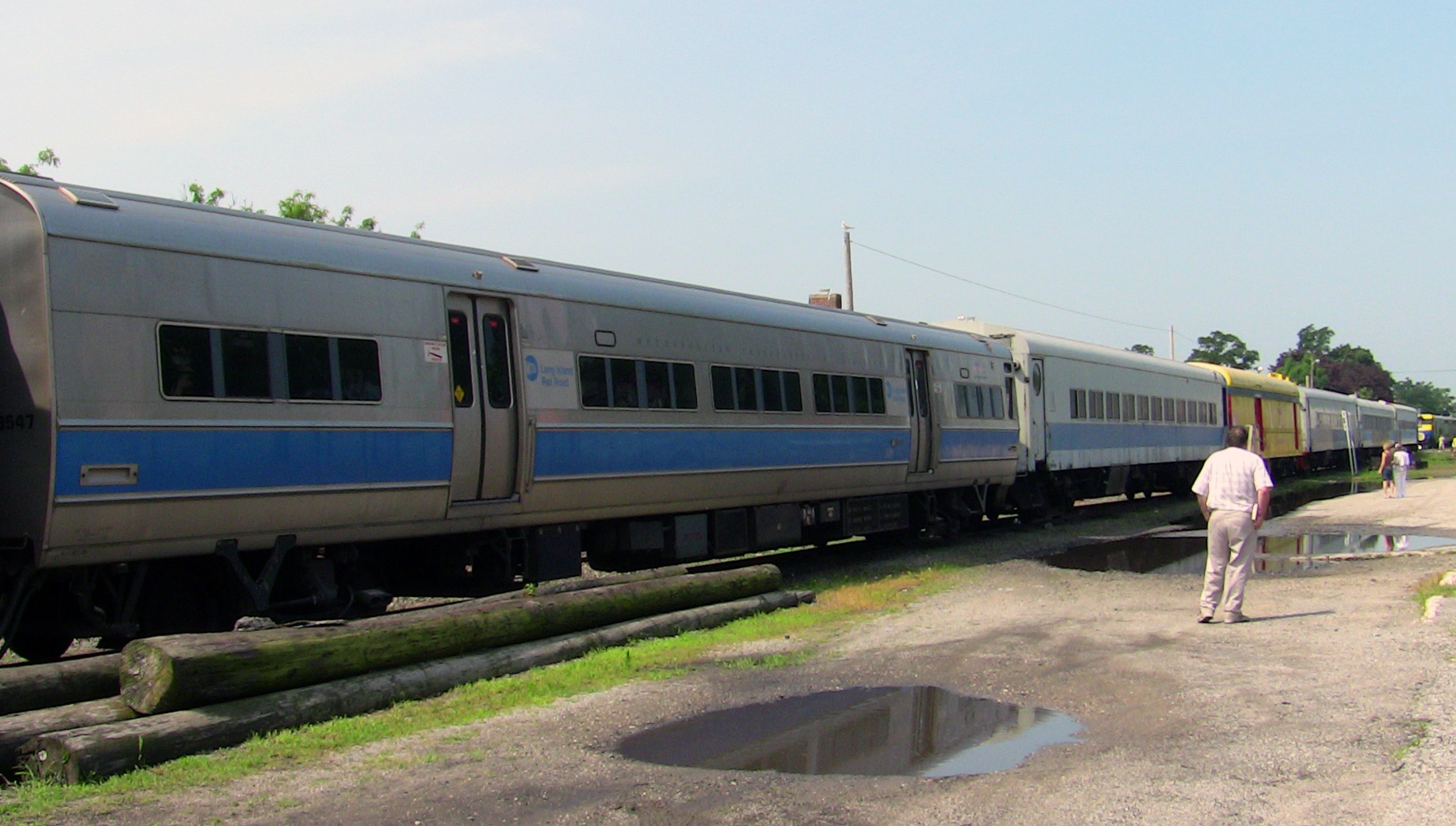
Preserved cars next to the LIRR tracks at Riverhead

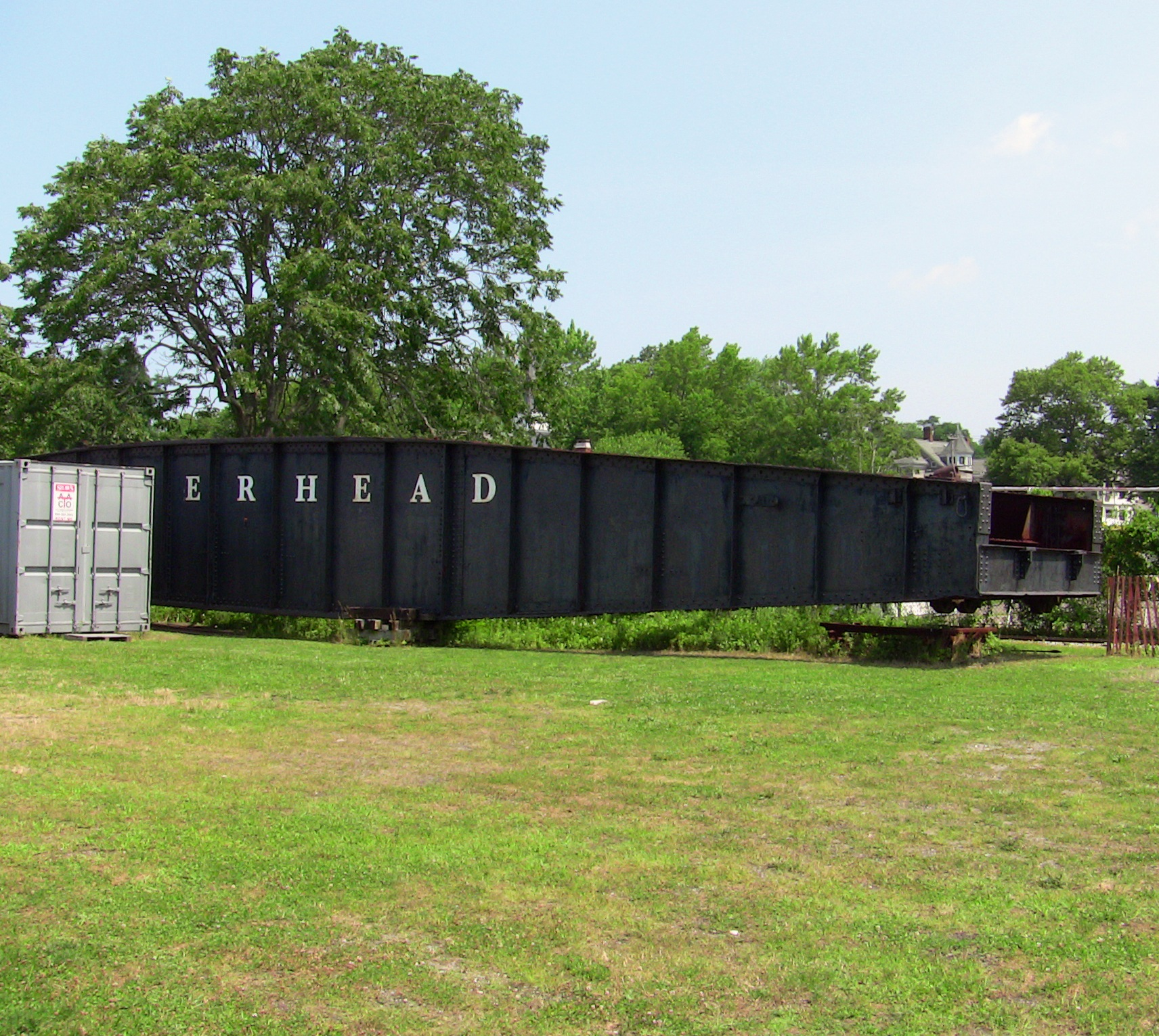
Part of a preserved turntable

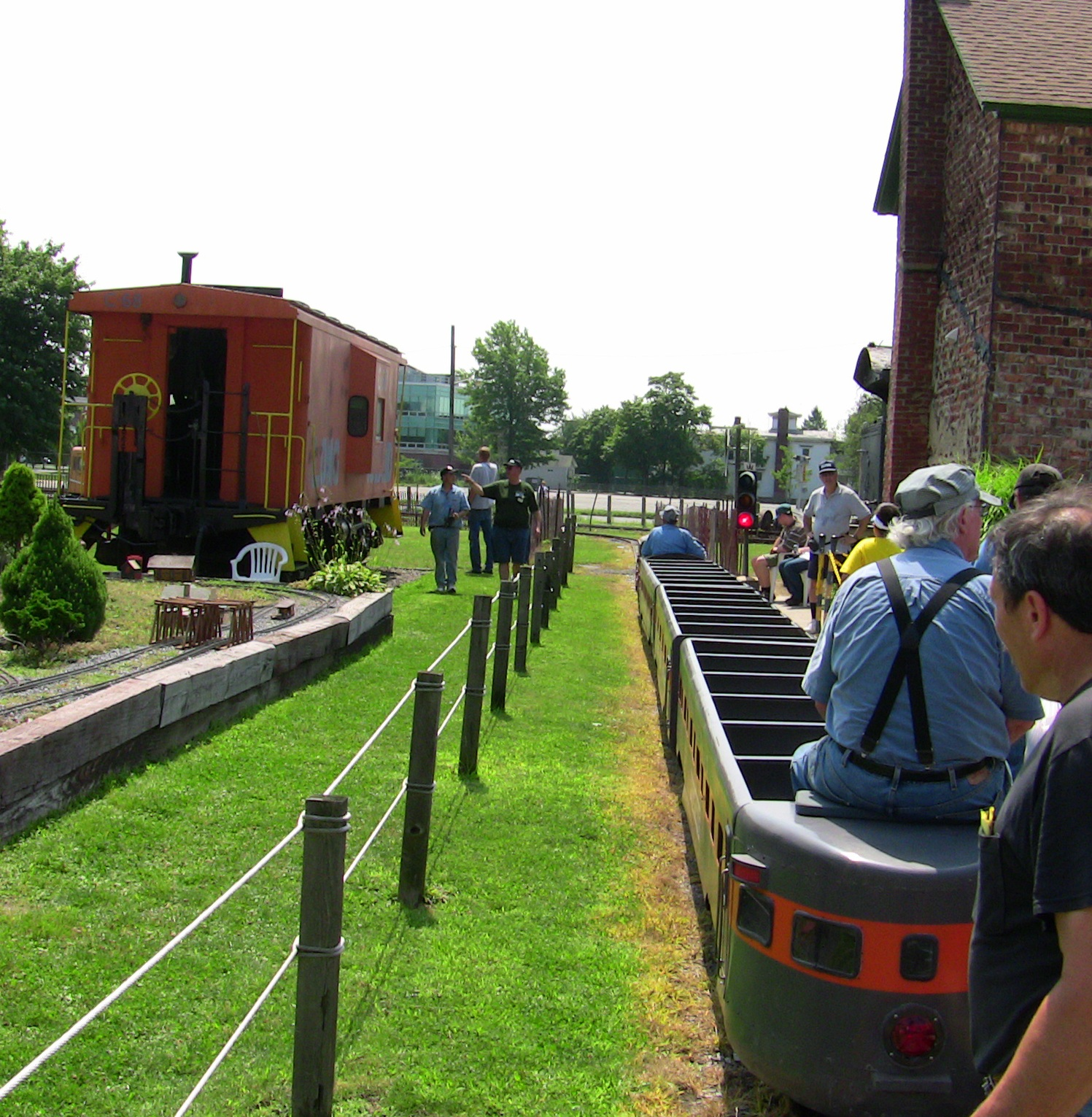
The World's Fair riding train

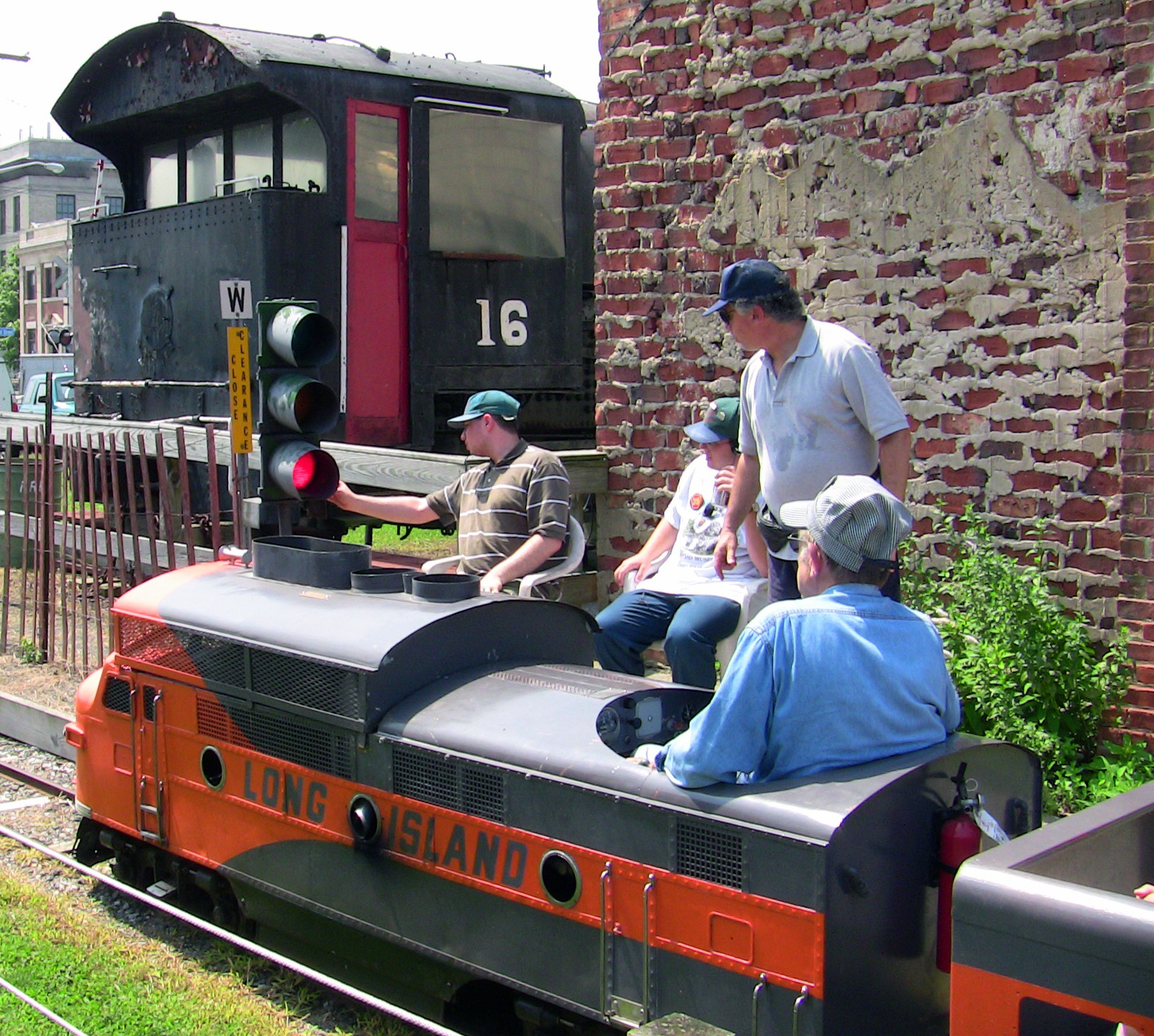
Closeup of the locomotive of the riding train

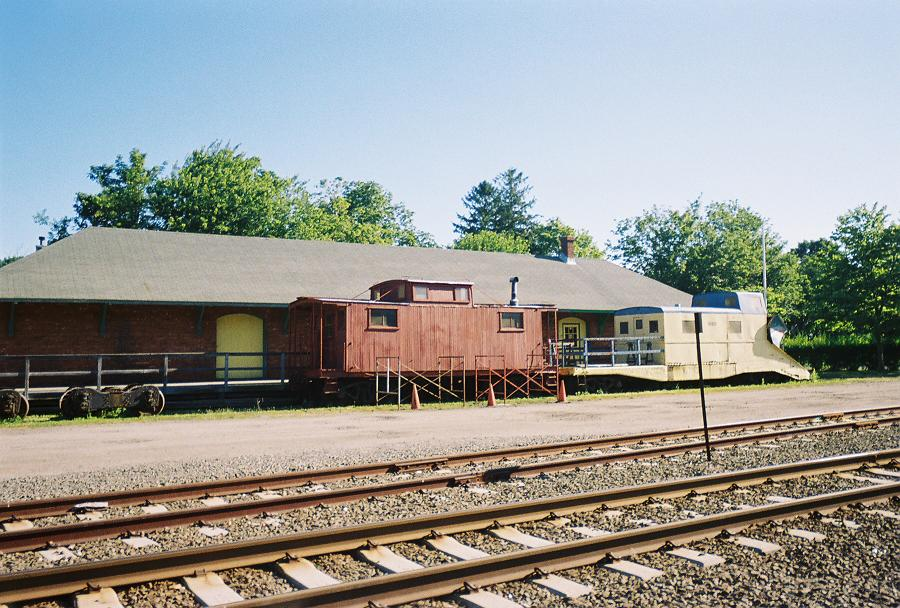
The former Greenport Station Freight House, now the Greenport RMLI location, shown in July 2007

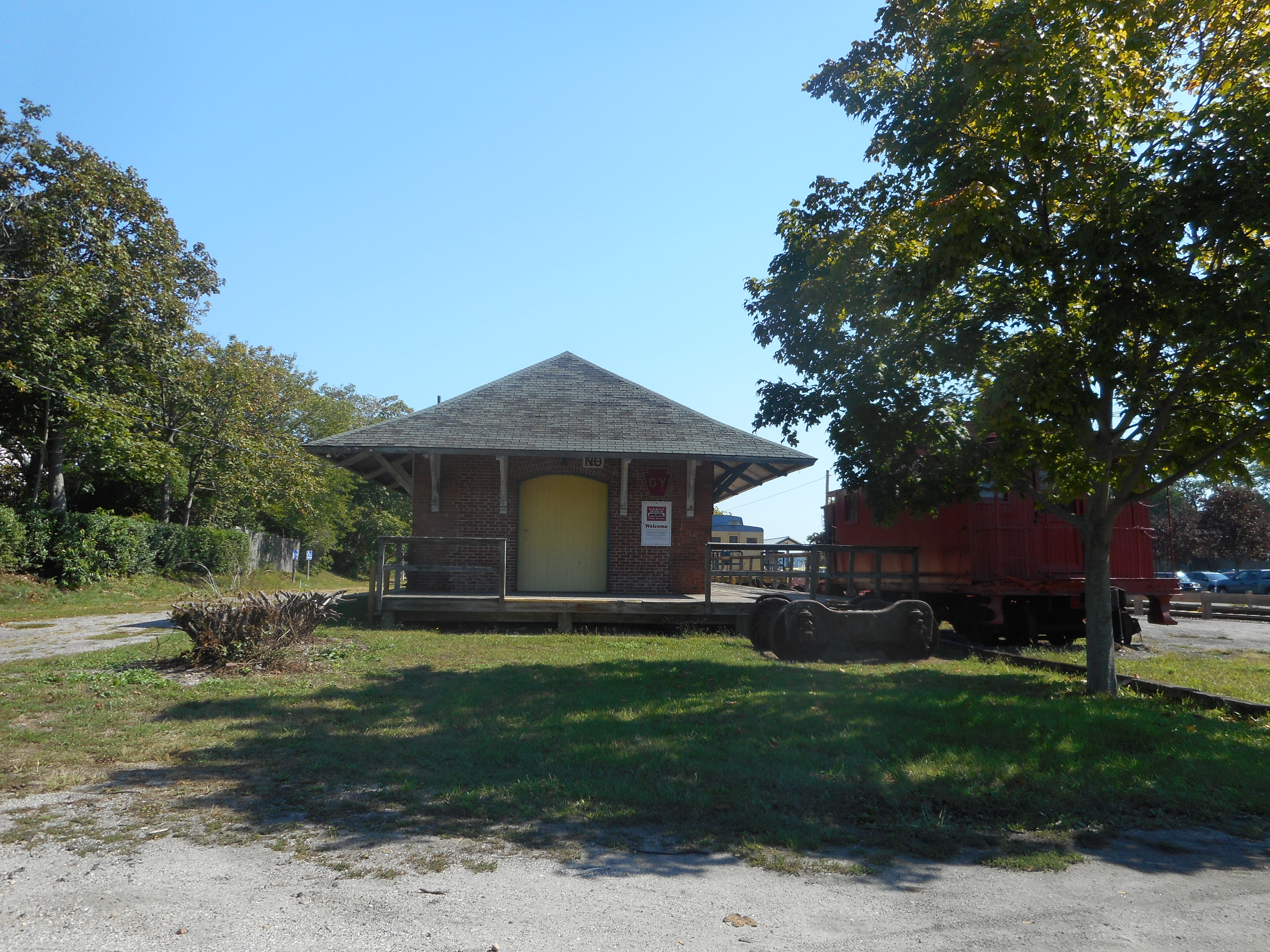
The same freight house along Fourth Street in September 2015

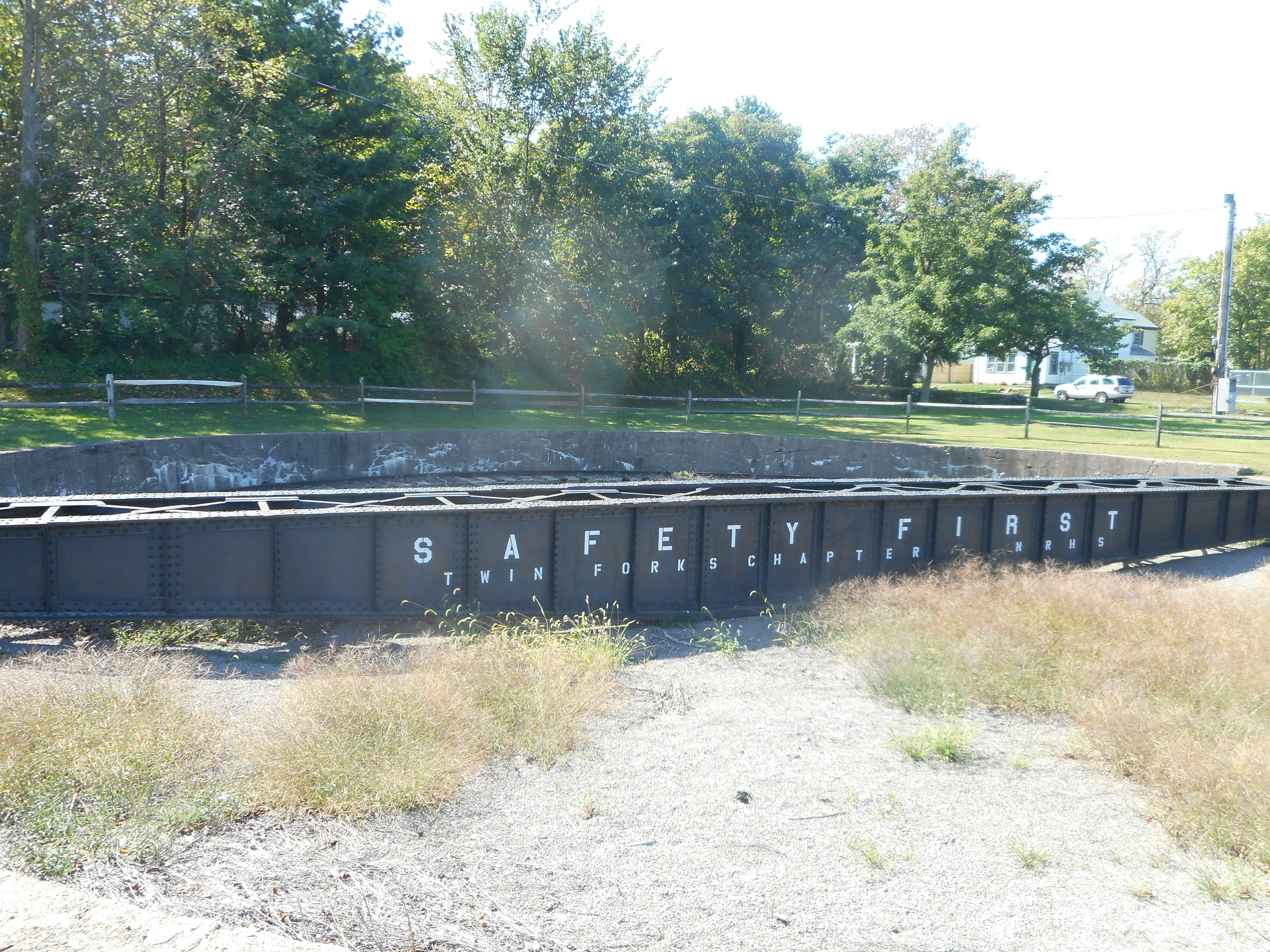
Part of the other preserved turntable

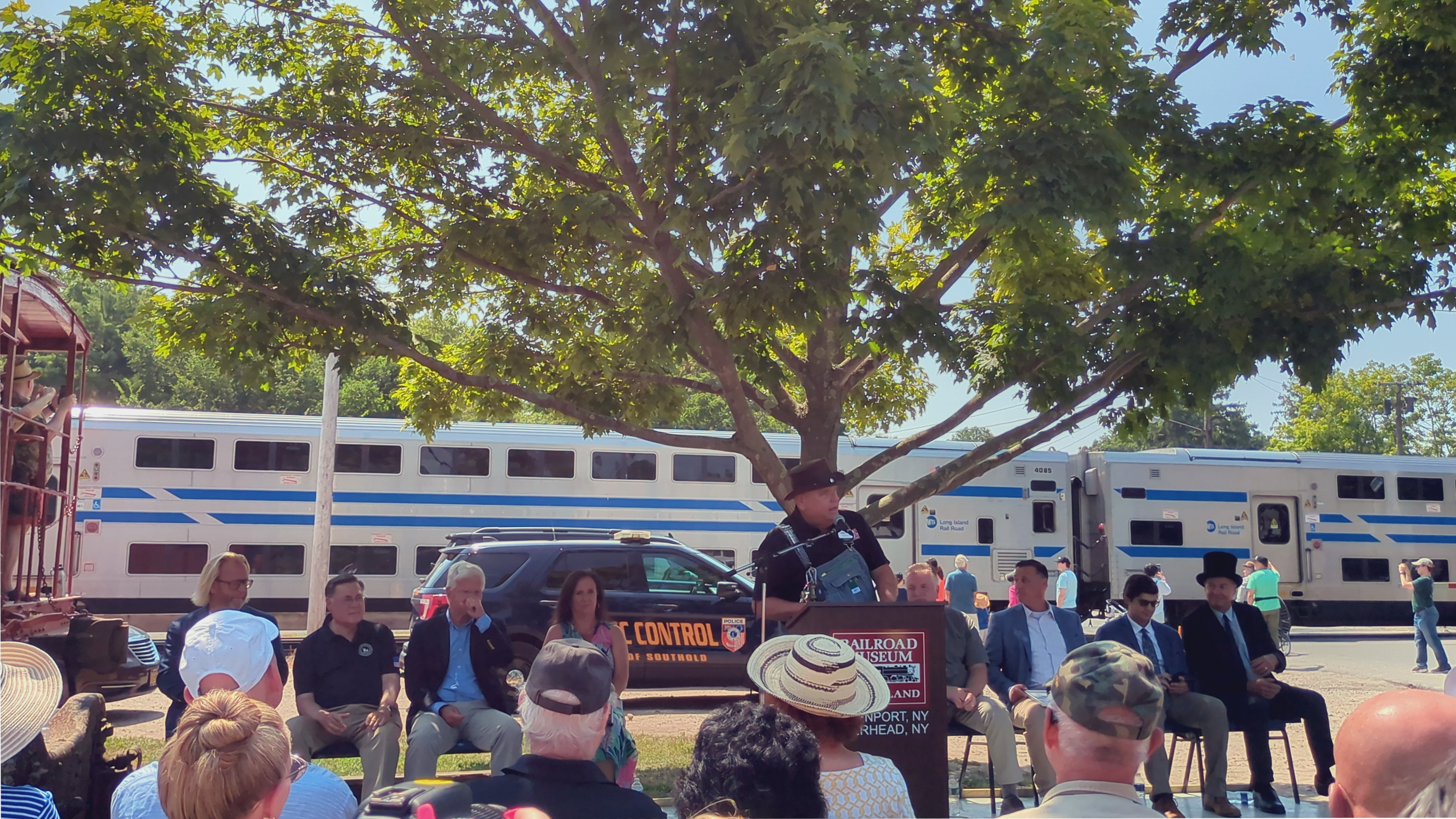
190th anniversary ceremony, held outside the museum in July 2024

== See also ==
- Oyster Bay Railroad Museum
- New York Transit Museum
- History of the Long Island Rail Road
- Greenport station
- Riverhead station
