= Gunma Insect World =

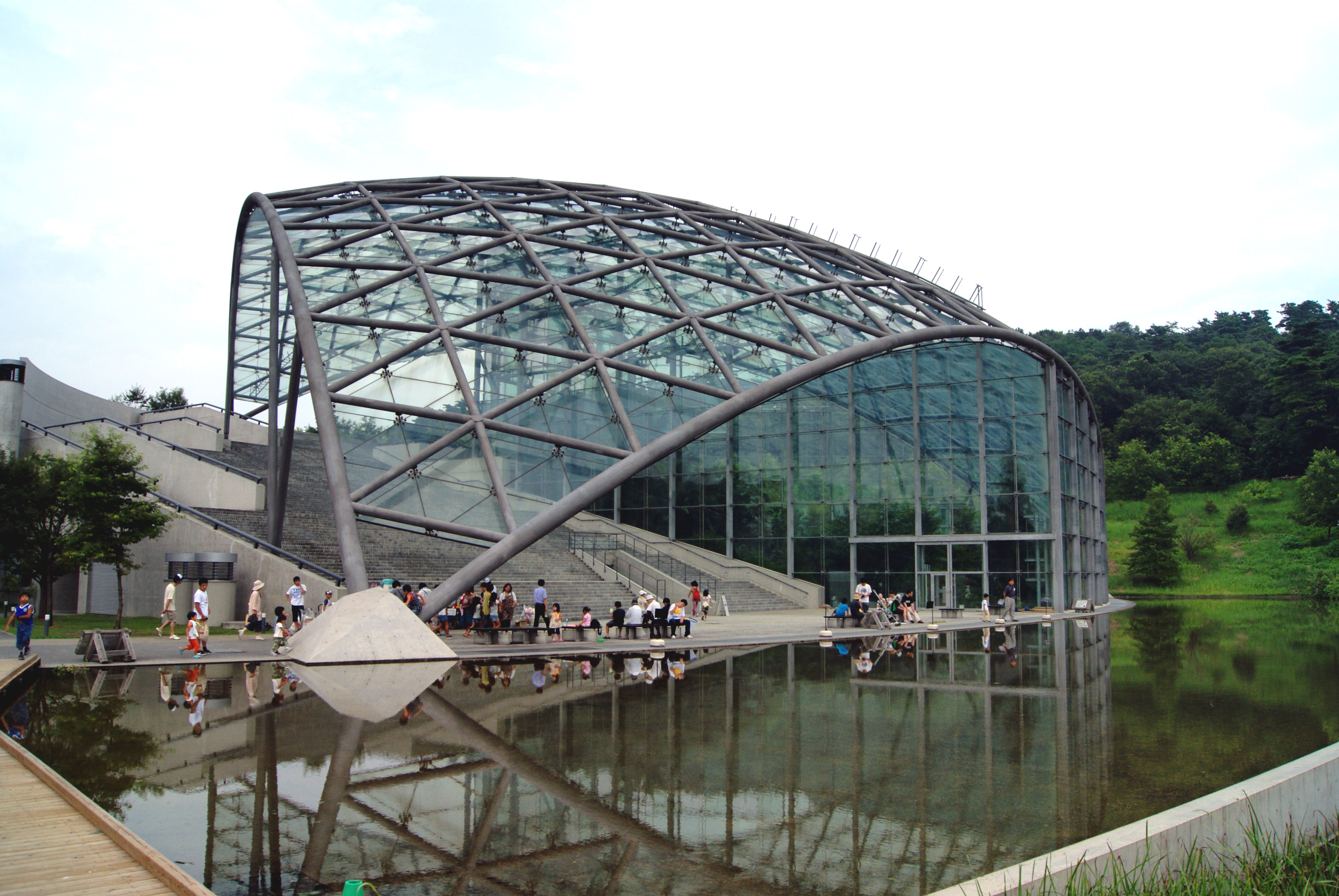
- The Glasshouse of Gunma Insect World
- Interactive map of Gunma Insect World
- 36°26′9.2″N 139°15′3.3″E
- Location: Kiryū, Gunma, Japan
- Website: www.giw.pref.gunma.jp/english/index.html

Gunma Insect World (ぐんま昆虫の森, Gunma Konchū-no Mori) Insect Observation Facility in Kiryū, Gunma, Japan is a learning facility for observing the ecology of insects. The building was designed by Tadao Ando, built by Takenaka Corporation with three other firms, and opened in 2005. The facility offers outdoor hands-on experience to allow visitors to observe and learn more about the world of insects.
