= Ravensborg =

Coordinates: 40°10′11.78″N 91°57′39.65″W

Ravensborg, originally called Norstead, was the name of a replica Viking Age fort in northern Missouri, near Knox City. Initial construction of the fort began in the spring of 2007. The site was renamed "Ravensborg" in 2009. In January 2024, it was announced that the fort was closed as the leased property was being sold.

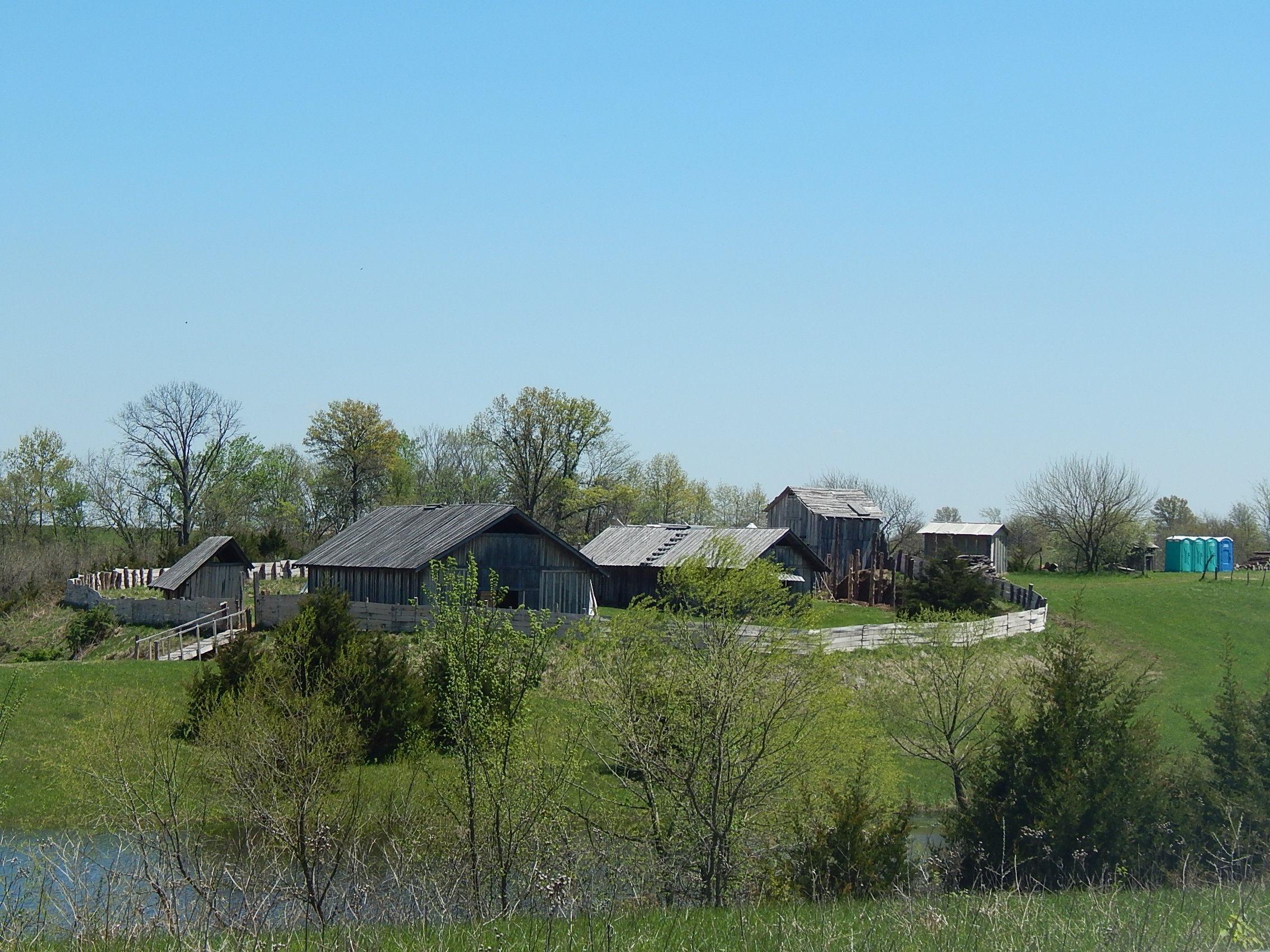
Ravensborg Viking Ringfort

Ravensborg was a type of ringfort – a circular earthen rampart and wood palisade with several buildings within. These included a longhouse, a cookhouse, a forge shelter, gate house, and personal cottages regular visitors constructed for use by their families and guests.

While not permanently inhabited, the site was used to recreate a Viking Age fortification allowing living history enthusiasts to experience medieval life in a longhouse for short periods. This is a form of experimental archeology and was expected to shed new light on how ordinary folk lived and functioned in such an environment. The fort contrasts with the temporary tent encampments typically experienced by reenactors.

Various Viking reenactment groups gathered here for twice-yearly celebrations in April and October. Participants were required to wear period clothing, participate in traditional crafts, eat historical foods, and essentially live an early Medieval lifestyle. Those trained in live-steel combat techniques were able participate in such activities here as well.
