= Green Family Forge =

Coordinates: 48°22′14″N 53°21′35″W

The Green Family Forge is a two-storey, wooden, heritage-designated blacksmith shop located at the intersection of West Street at Dandy Lane in Trinity, Trinity Bay, Newfoundland and Labrador.

== Description ==
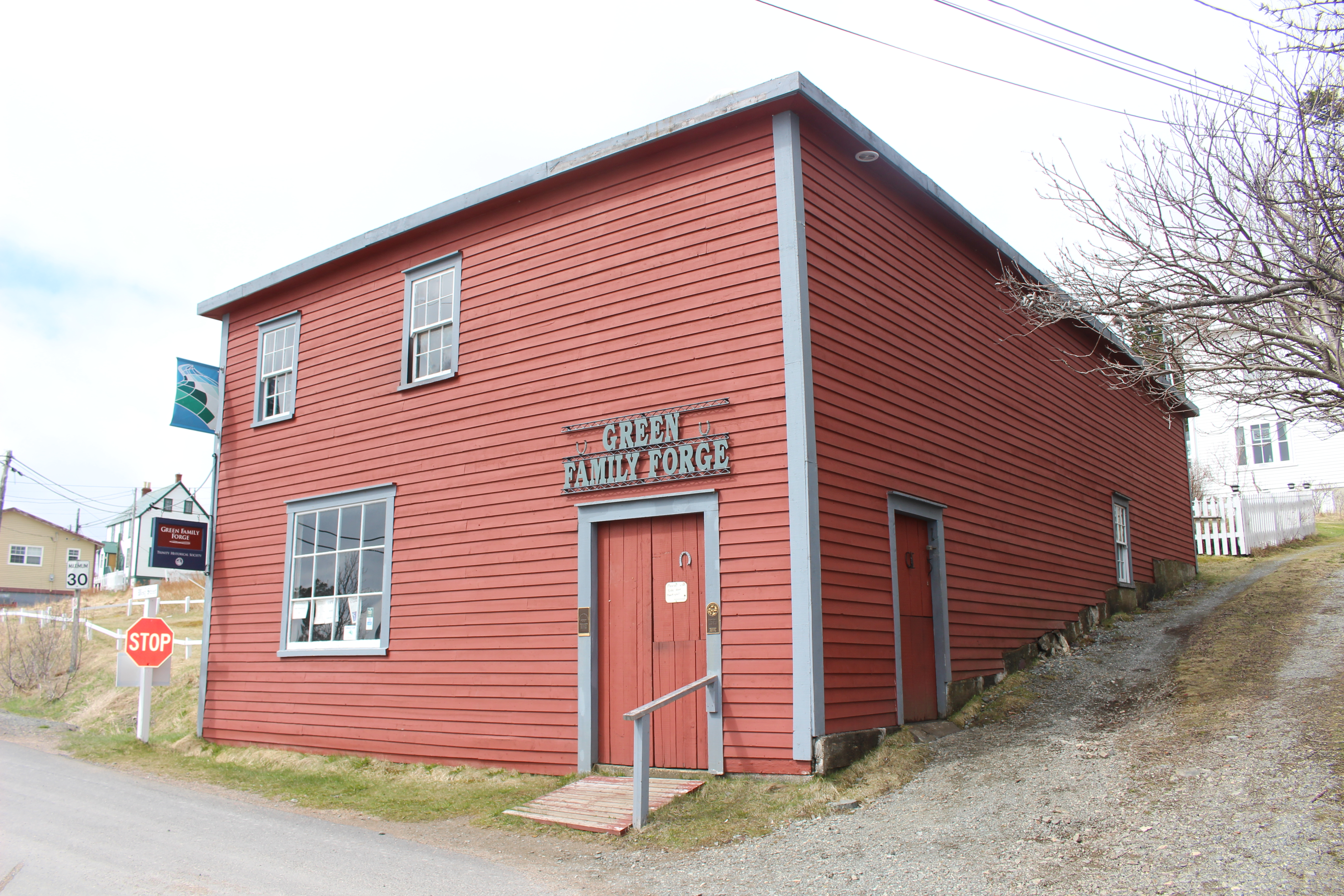
Exterior of the Green Family Forge in Trinity, Newfoundland and Labrador.

The forge is a two-storey, plain, box-like building of nailed timber-frame construction, with a red clapboard exterior and a flat, sloped-back roof. The few windows were designed to keep the interior dark, allowing the blacksmith to distinguish the changing colours of heated metals.

One of what were a number of Trinity forges, Green’s is unusual by virtue of its size. It was built by the Green family to replace an existing forge in the area operated by them. The interior is large for forges of that time, having two fires – one large and one small. Often both would be in use to keep up with the demand for services. Various tools and bellows related to the blacksmith trade are housed in the interior. The exterior is plain and is representative of a fast disappearing building type typical to early industrial operations.

The second storey runs across the front part of the forge only, used as an office and stock room, while horses sheltered below waiting to be shod. A shallow well at the back wall supplied water needed for cooling forged items.

== Early history ==
The Green Family practised as blacksmiths in Trinity before 1750; the death of John Green is recorded in the Church records for 1764. John James Green built the forge between 1895 and 1900. He was married at St. Thomas Anglican Church, St. John's, on 24 June 1890, and is listed in the marriage records as being 27, a bachelor, and blacksmith, from Trinity West; he married Mary Ann Fowlow, 25, spinster, of Trinity East.

Multiple generations pursued the trade in the building, ending with Andrew Green in 1955. The Green family used the forge for making tools, horseshoes, iron fences and gates, and items used for fishing and shipbuilding.

== Restoration ==
The Forge was left virtually intact after it was last used in 1955; in 1990, Ada Lucille (Green) Nemec, daughter of Andrew Green, donated the Forge to the Trinity Historical Society.

The roof was repaired and the windows and doors and clapboard were restored. After it was opened in 1991, it was discovered that the two chimneys were not properly operational. With a grant from the Heritage Foundation the two forges were restored to fully operational condition in 1995. In 1992 fifteen hundred artifacts made of iron were cleaned and dipped in a preservation solution. Wooden walkways were constructed and set into the earthen floor to prevent the transfer of dirt and debris to the footwear of visitors.

The building was designated as a Registered Heritage Structure in 1991. In 1999, the society hired Gilbert Hiscock to train Wade Ivany as the forge's resident blacksmith, who took that position in 2001. Circa 2011, Devin Hookey began as a blacksmith apprentice in the forge. The Society has used the forge to offer blacksmithing workshops. The forge functions as a cultural tourism social enterprise and makes and sells objects, including hooks for traditional mat making, as well as other hooks, fireplace pokers, coat racks and even the odd metal dragon.

For their restoration work, the society received the Southcott Award from the Newfoundland Historic Trust in 1998, and the Manning Award from the Historic Sites Association of Newfoundland and Labrador in 2004. Records from the forge are housed with the Trinity Historical Society. The building was listed on the Canadian Register of Historic Places 2005/01/11. Ada, the last of the Green family, died January 20, 2019, in her 94th year. The Forge won the 2021 Ecclesiastical Insurance Cornerstone Award for Resilient Historic Places, awarded by the National Trust for Canada for "exemplary projects and places that contribute to quality of life and sense of place."
