= Long Island Aquarium =

Aquarium in Riverhead, New York, United States

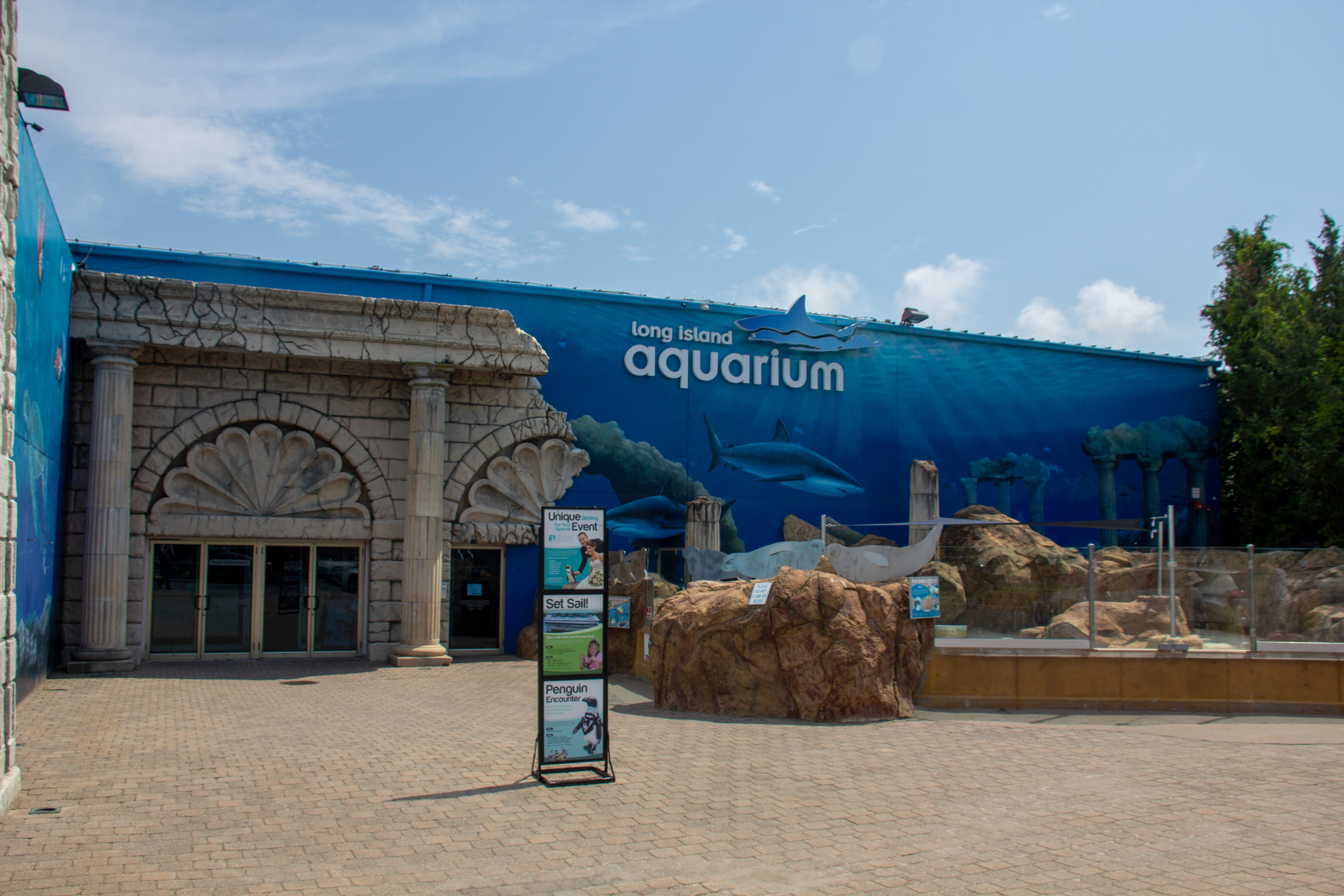
- Interactive map of Long Island Aquarium
- 40.917874°N 72.656407°W
- Date opened: June 2000, 15; 26 years ago
- Location: Riverhead, New York, United States
- Volume of largest tank: 120,000 US gallons (450,000 L)
- Public transit: Riverhead station
- Website: longislandaquarium.com

Long Island Aquarium (formerly Atlantis Marine World) is an aquarium that opened in 2000 on Long Island in Riverhead, New York, United States.

One of its biggest attractions is a 20,000-US-gallon (76,000 L) coral reef display tank, which is one of the largest all-living coral displays in the Western Hemisphere.

The classical theme of the aquarium's entrance, along with many areas inside, draw inspiration from the lost city of Atlantis.

== History ==
Construction on the aquarium began in 1999, and it opened on June 15, 2000. The Town of Riverhead bought the land in 1995 with the hopes the Okeanos Foundation of Hampton Bays, New York would operate it as part of a rehabilitation project of the Peconic waterfront. However, Okeanos was unable to raise funds. Space has been given in the aquarium to the Riverhead Foundation for Marine Research and Preservation.

The aquarium's original cost of $15 million was provided by developers James J. Bissett and Joseph M. Petrocelli.

On July 1, 2011, it changed its name to Long Island Aquarium and Exhibition Center after undergoing a $24 million expansion including a brand-new Exhibition Center, a 28,000-square-foot (2,600 m^{2}) Sea Star Grand Ballroom (which joined its successful catering component, Atlantis Banquets & Events), as well as construction of a 100-room waterfront Hyatt Place hotel. The aquarium also owns and operates a 120-slip marina called Treasure Cove Resort Marina. The aquarium was featured in the 5th season of The Apprentice and the Elmo's World episodes "Fish" and "Penguins".

== Exhibits ==
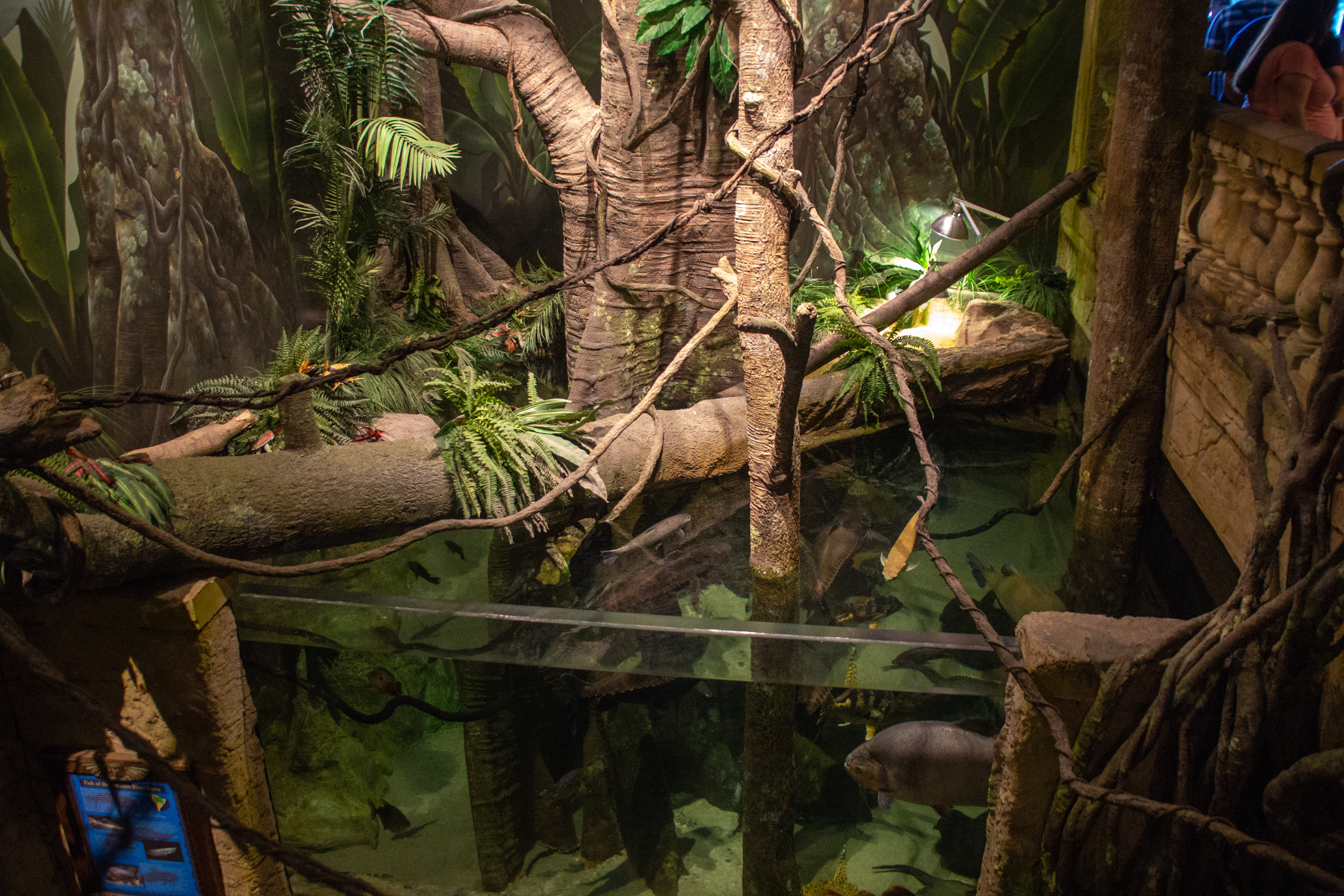
The Amazon Rainforest exhibit at the Long Island Aquarium reminds us of our responsibility to our planet's environment and animal life by showcasing some of the largest and most interesting Amazon fishes and aquatic life.

Indoor exhibits include Amazon Rainforest, American Alligators, Archer Fish, Best Buddies (clownfish and sea anemone), Birds, Bugs and Butterflies Exhibit, Coral Reef, Cuttlefish, Discus Fish, Electric Eel, Flounder Find, Form & Function, Giant Pacific Octopus, Jellyfish, Local Rocky Shores, Lost City of Atlantis Shark Exhibit, Marmosets, Megalodon Display, Moray Eels, Ocean Creatures of the World/Crab Villa (Japanese spider crab), Piranha, Poseidon's Treasure Room, Puffer Fish, Ray Bay, Sand Shark Lagoon, Schooling Fish (common Pacific silver moonfish), Seahorses, Shipwreck/Artificial Reef (Lionfish), Tidal Marsh, an interactive touch tank and Turtle Bay (Australian snake-necked turtle, red-eared sliders and east African black mud turtles).

Outdoor exhibits include Ancient Reptile Ruins (green tree python and mangrove monitor), Creatures of the Night (Brazilian prehensile-tailed porcupine and Pallas's long tailed bats), Gator Invasion, Koi Pond, Interactive Salt Marsh, Lost Temple of Atlantis (Japanese snow monkeys), Otter Falls (North American river otters), Penguin Pavilion (African penguin), Ray Bay, Sea Lion Coliseum, Seals and Critter Corner.

Interactive displays include Interactive Salt Marsh, Arcade, Ray Bay, Sea Lion Kiss, Submarine Simulator, hands on touch tank, and an Interactive Creature Feature

== Gallery ==
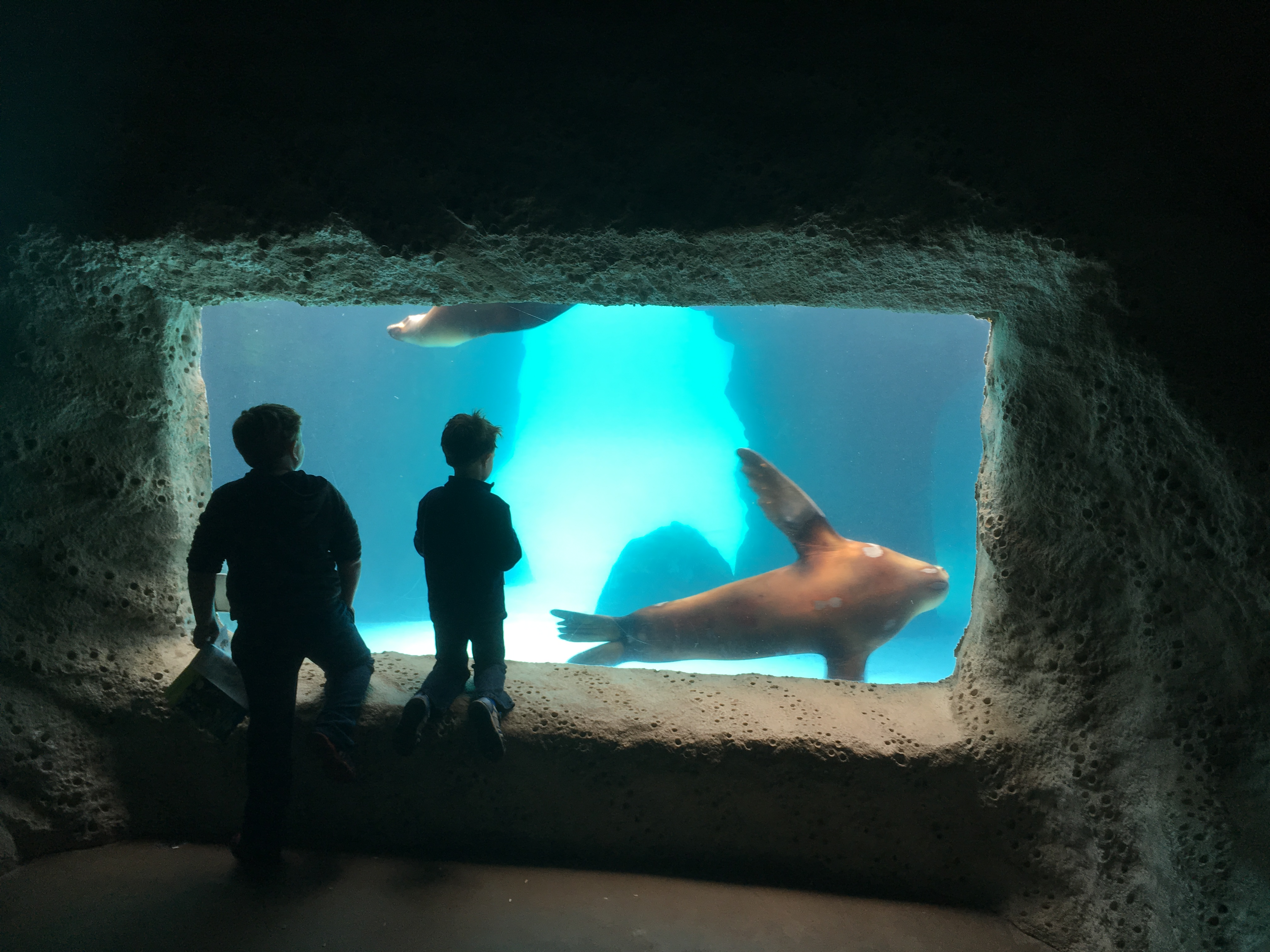

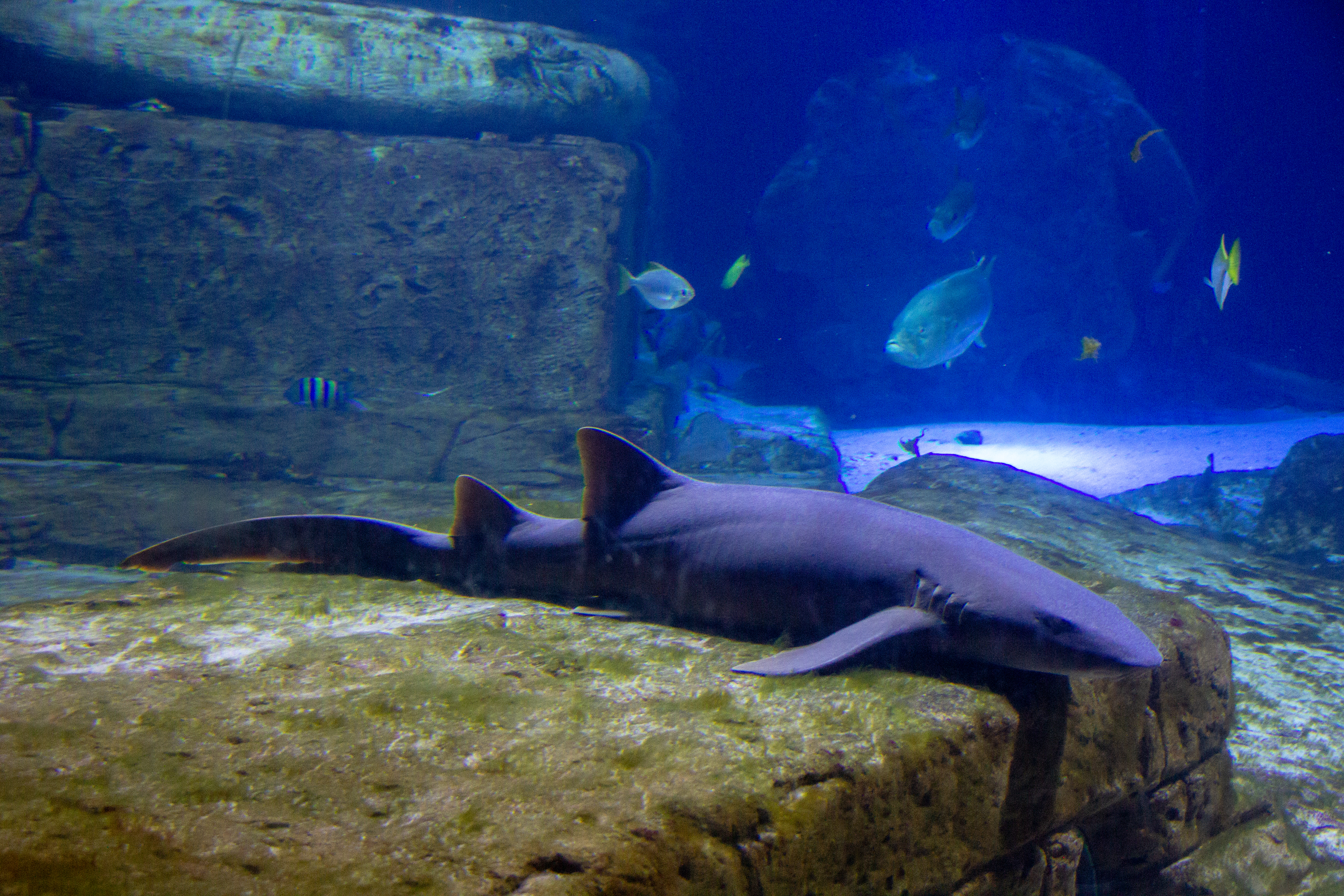

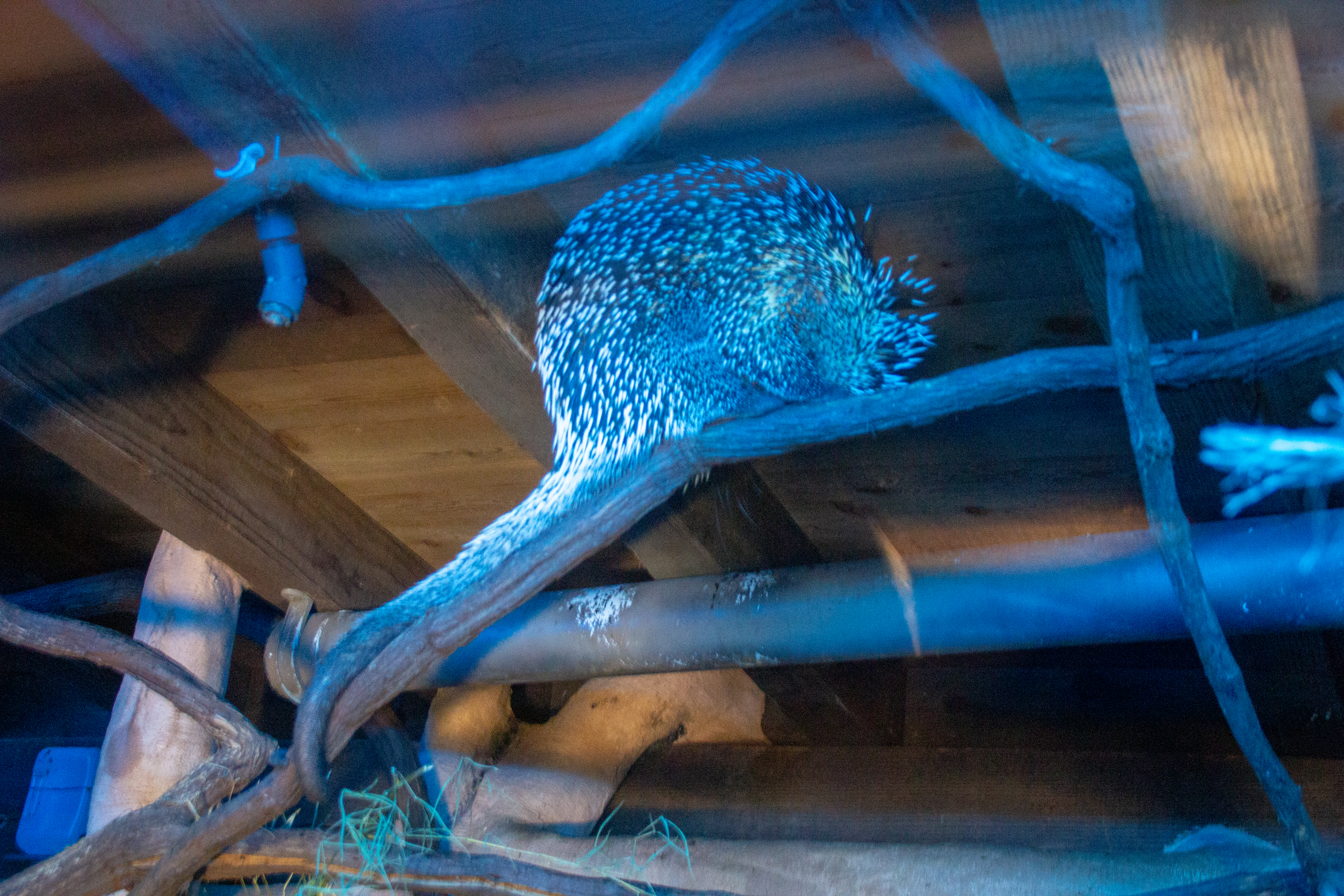

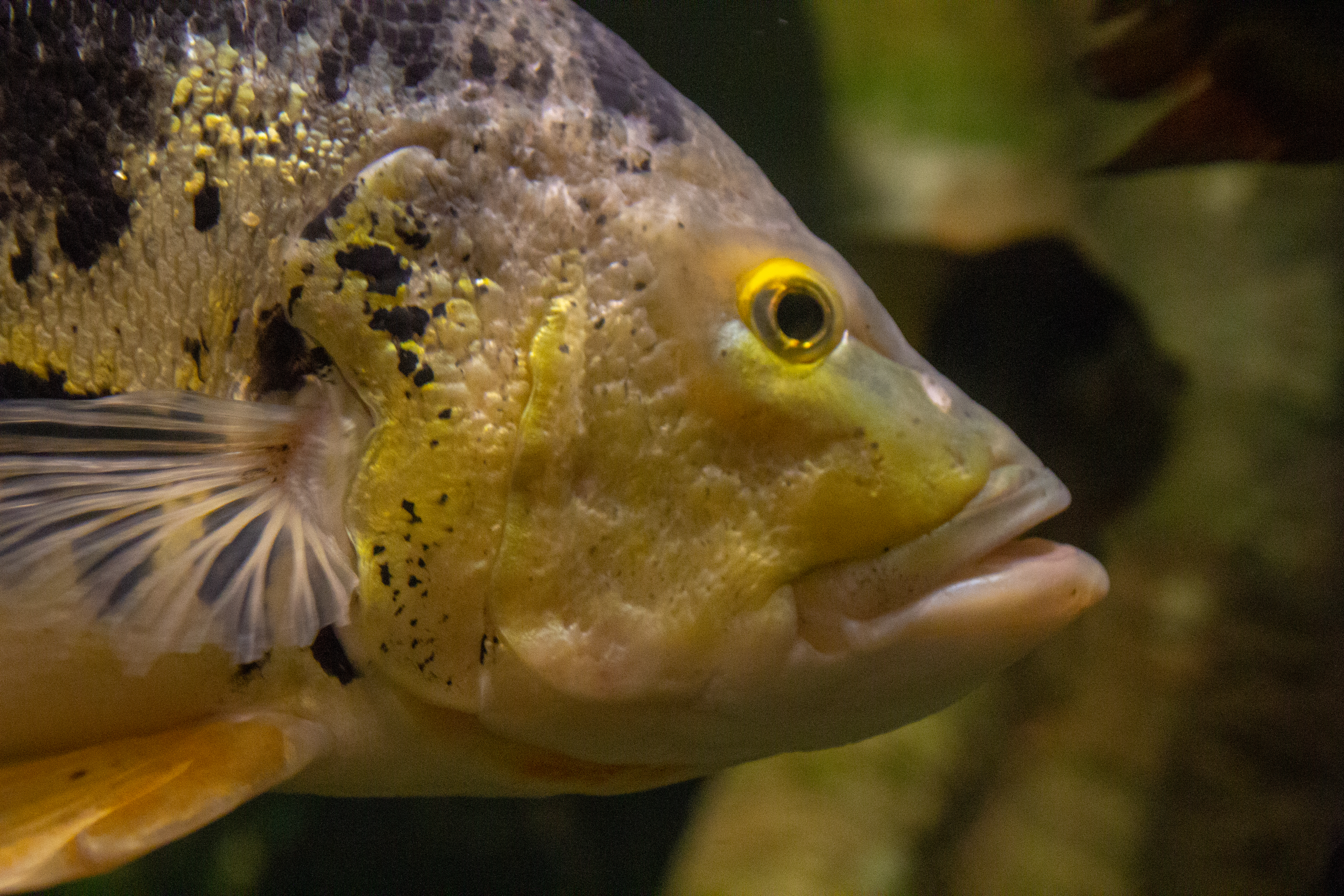

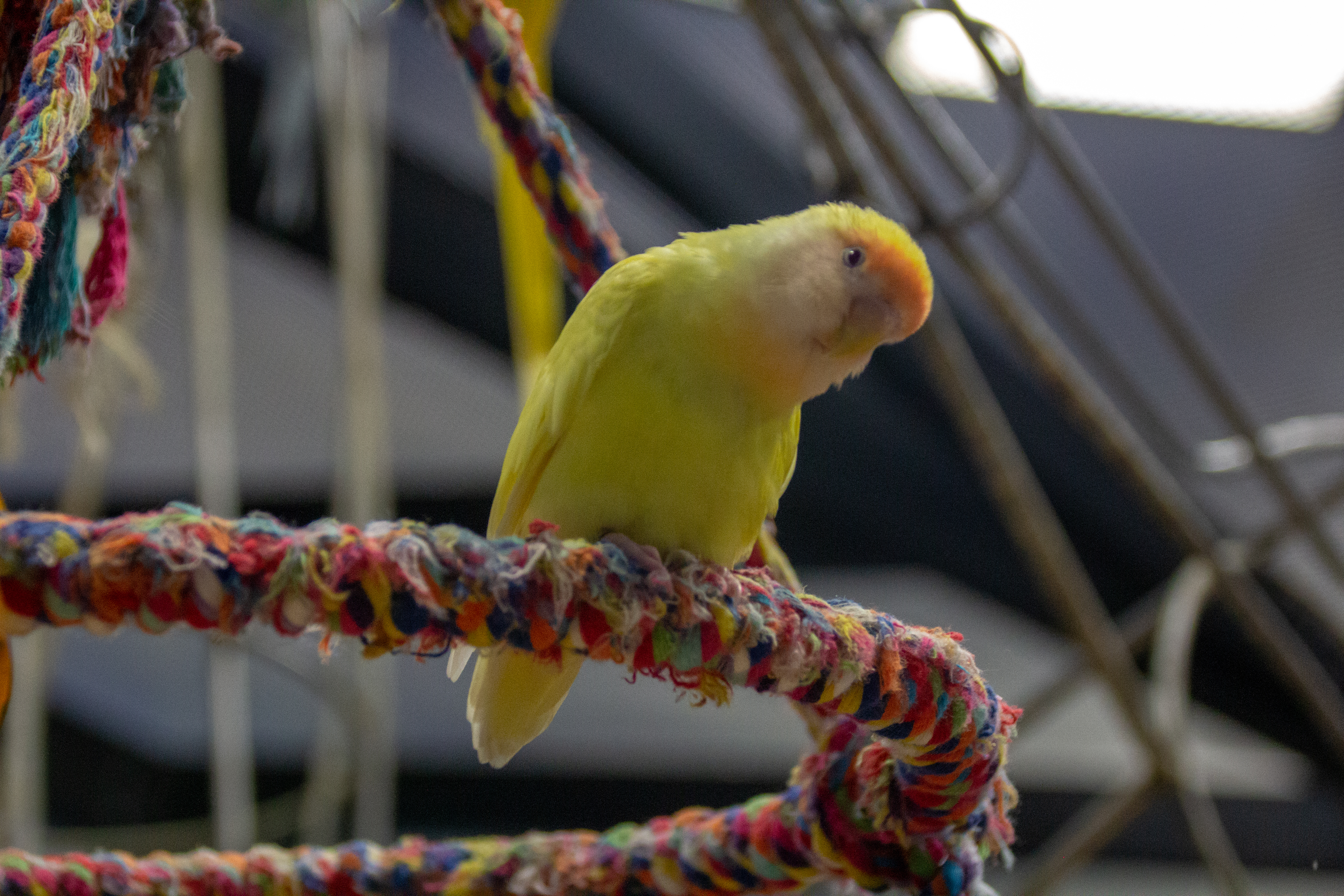

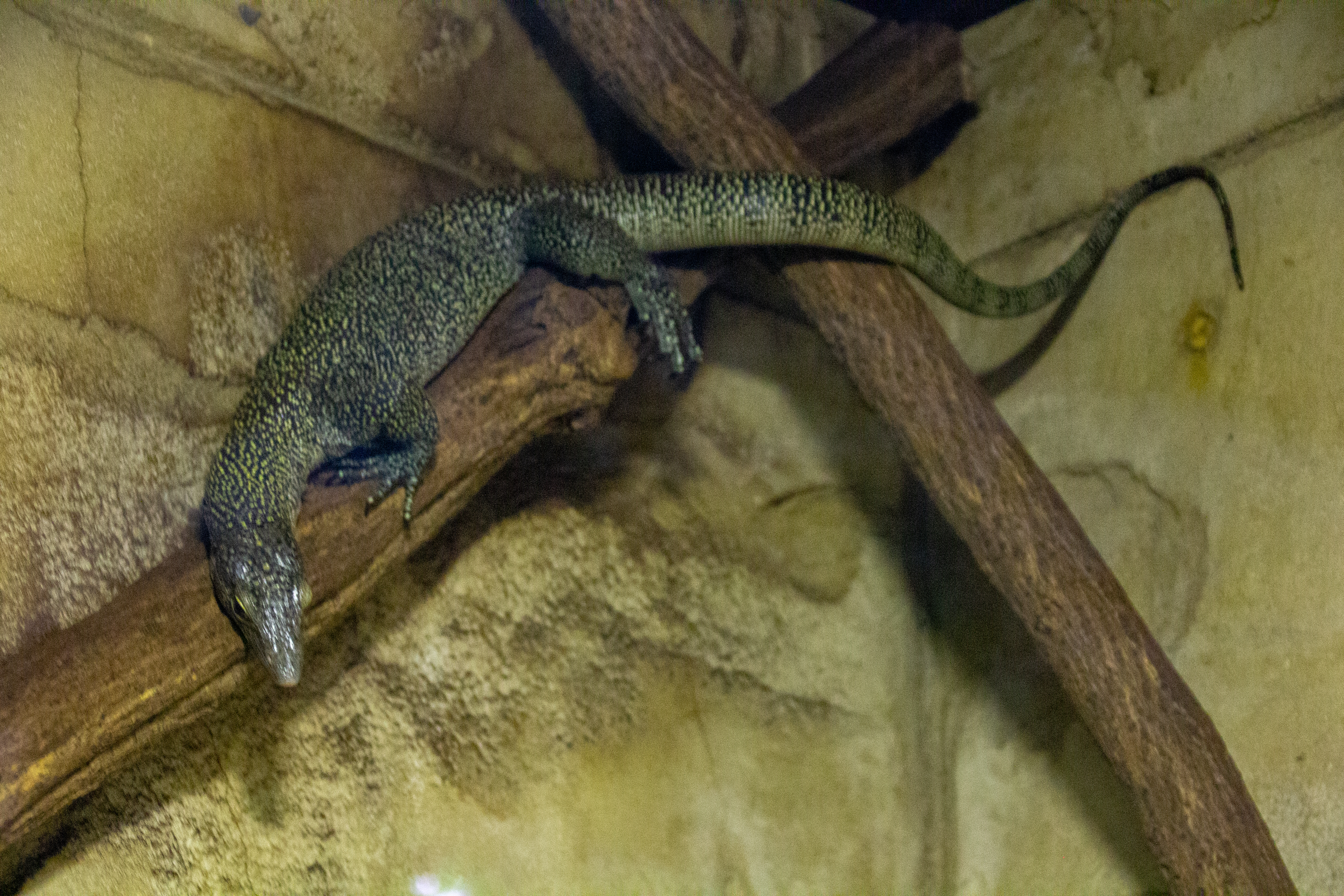

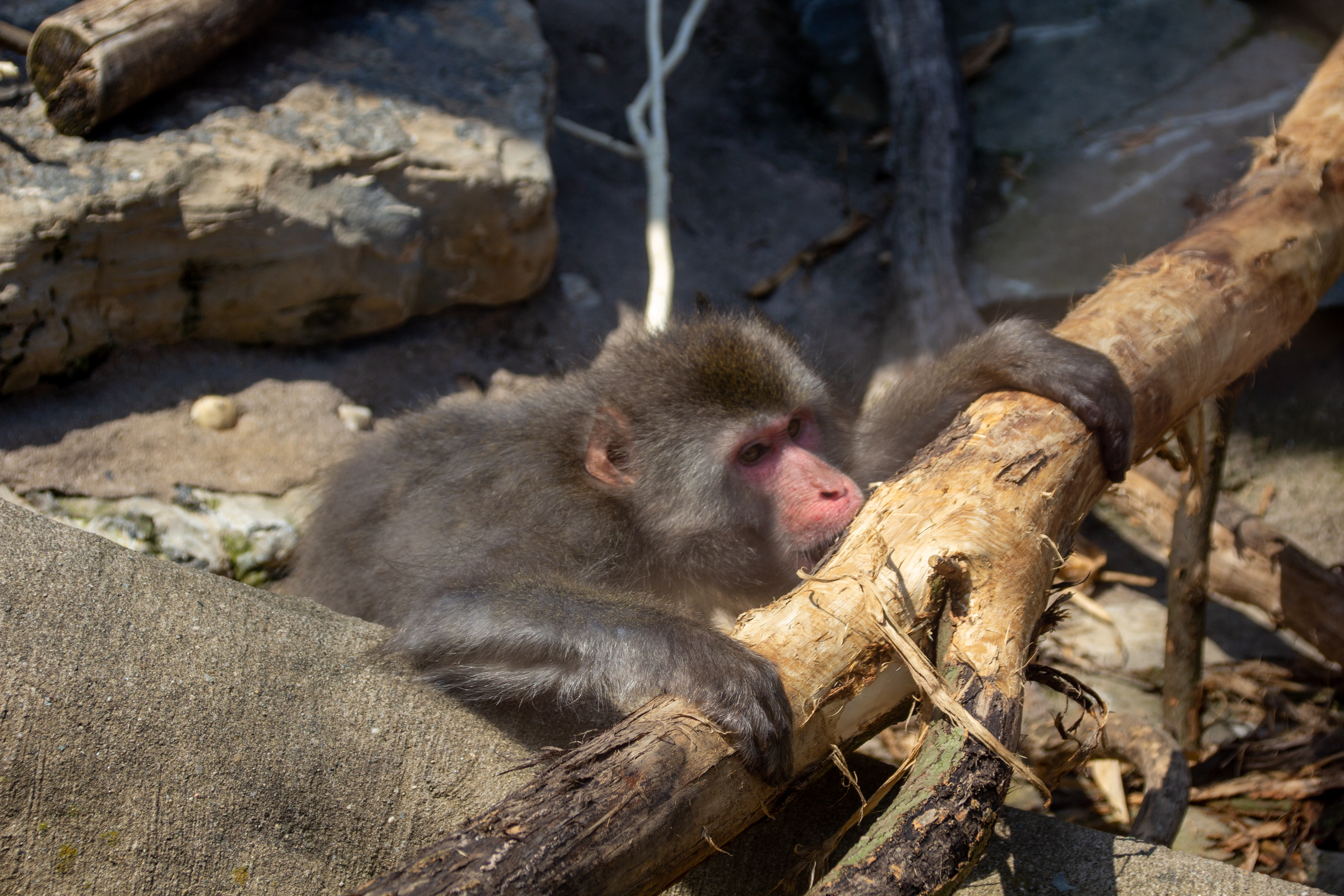

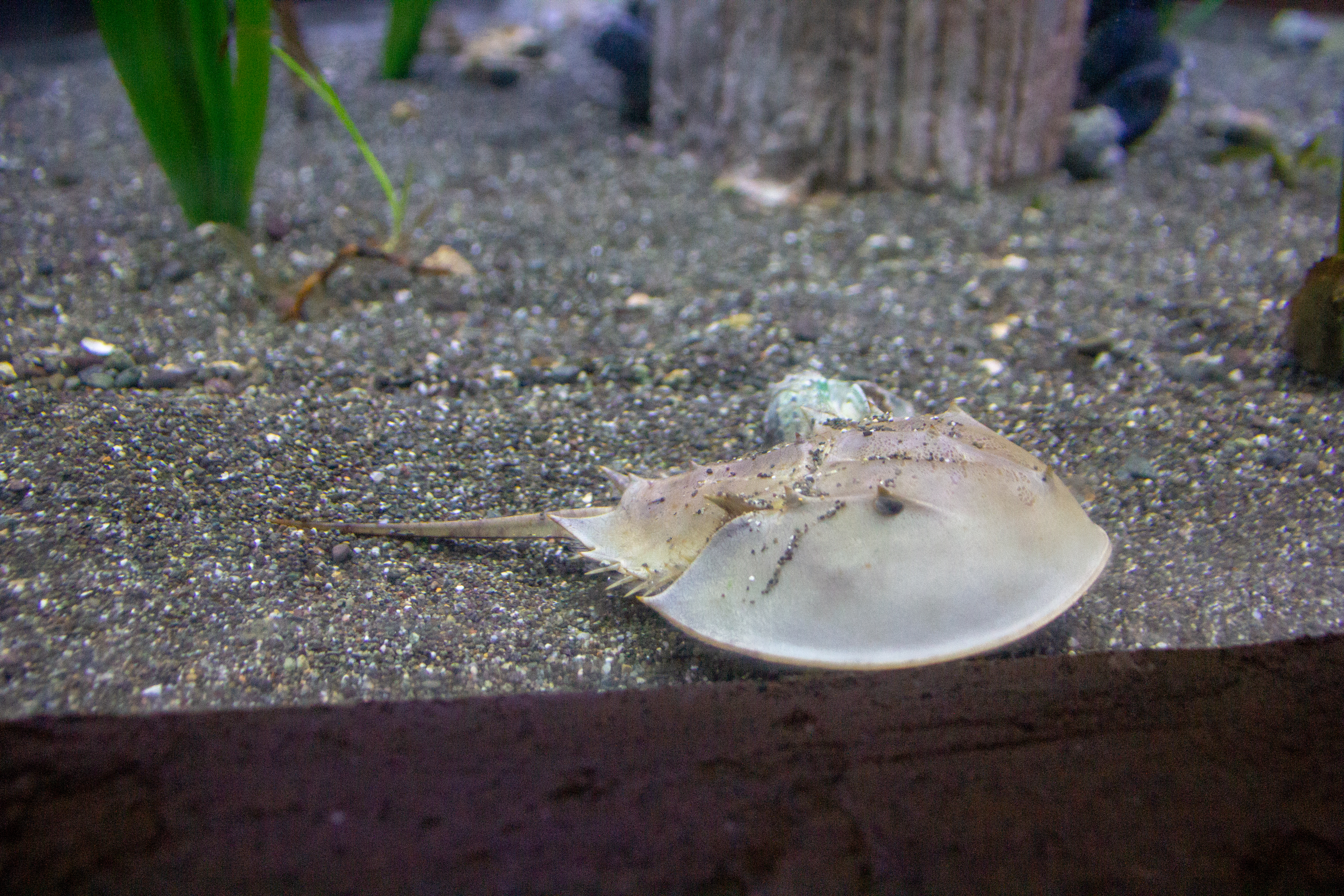

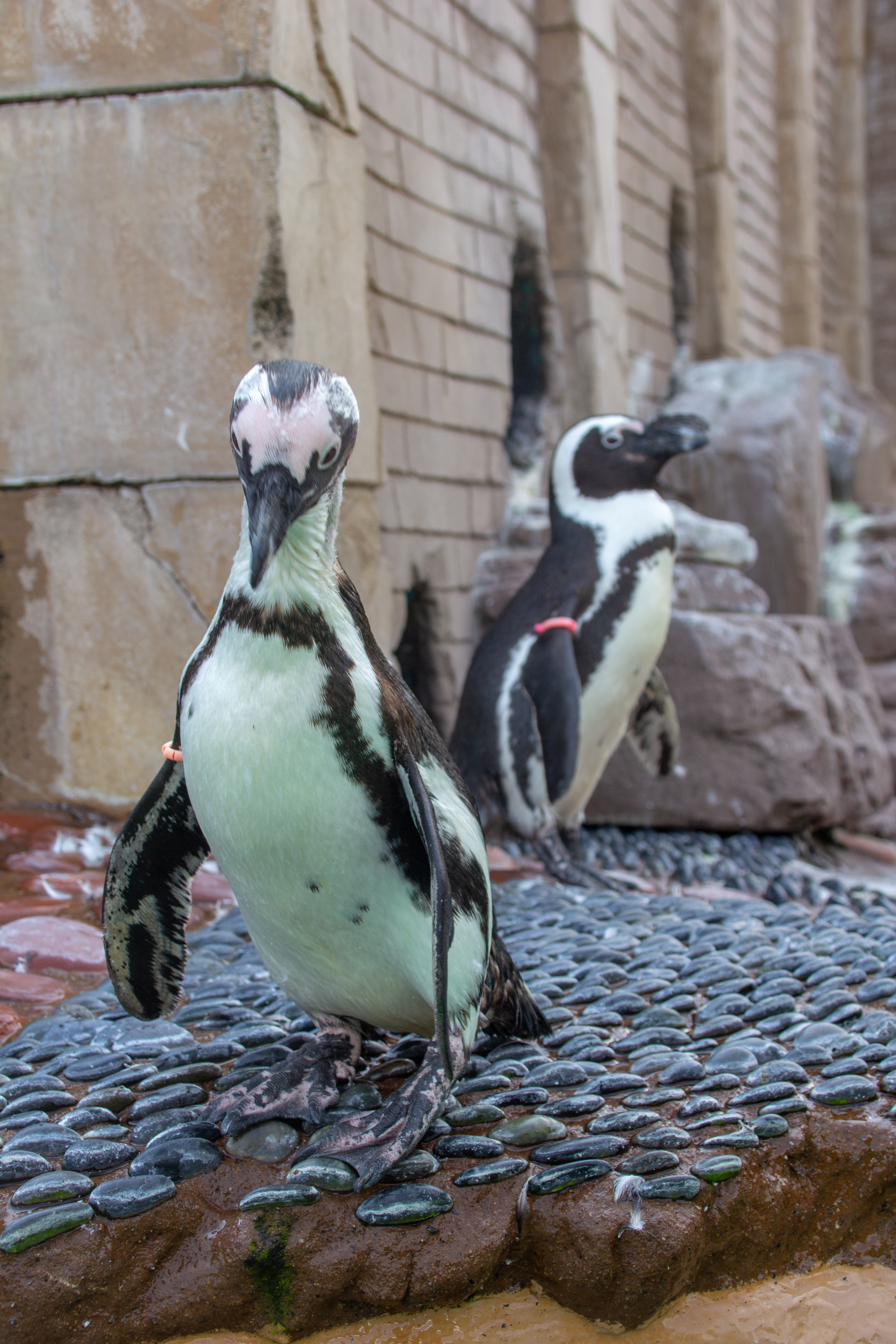

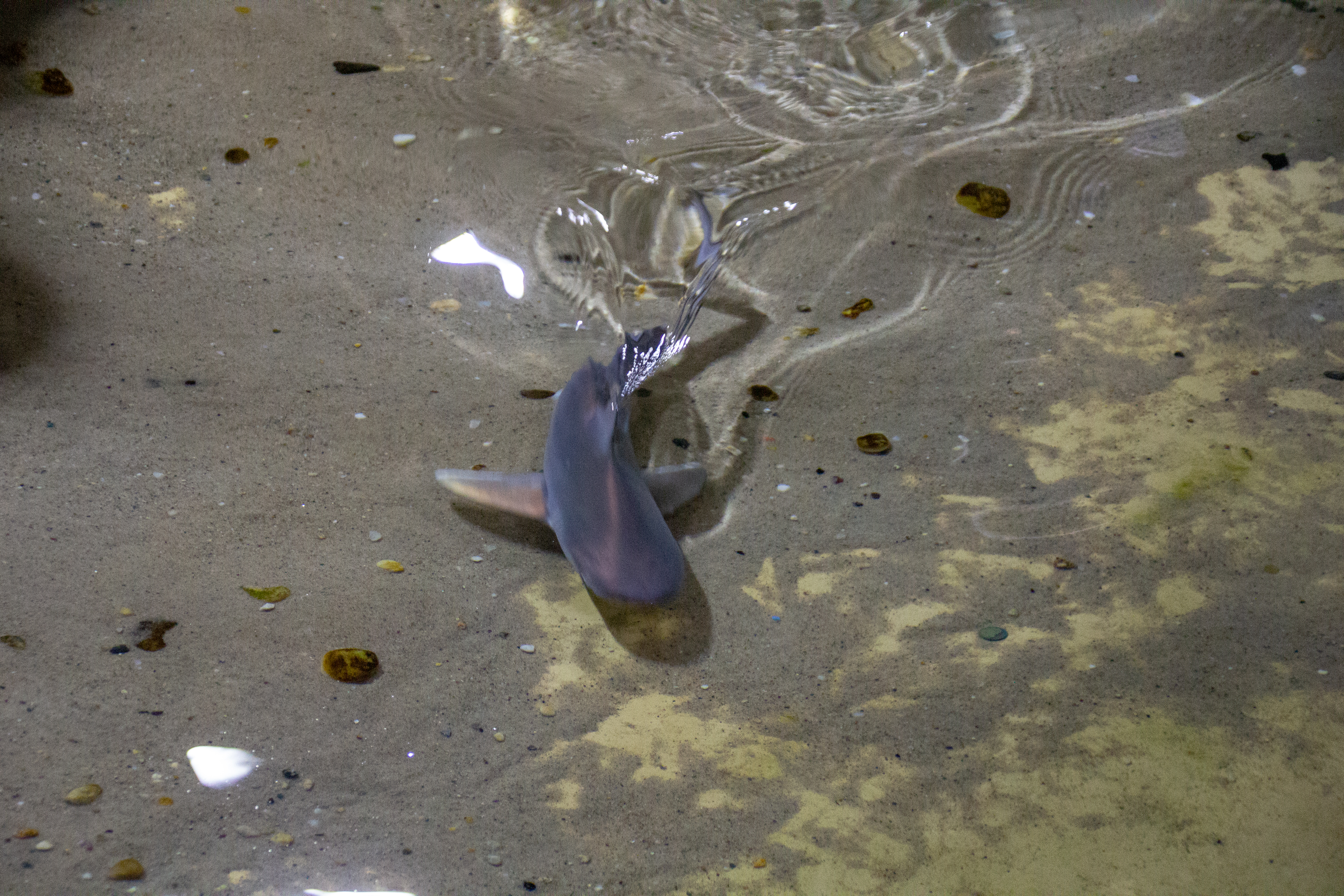
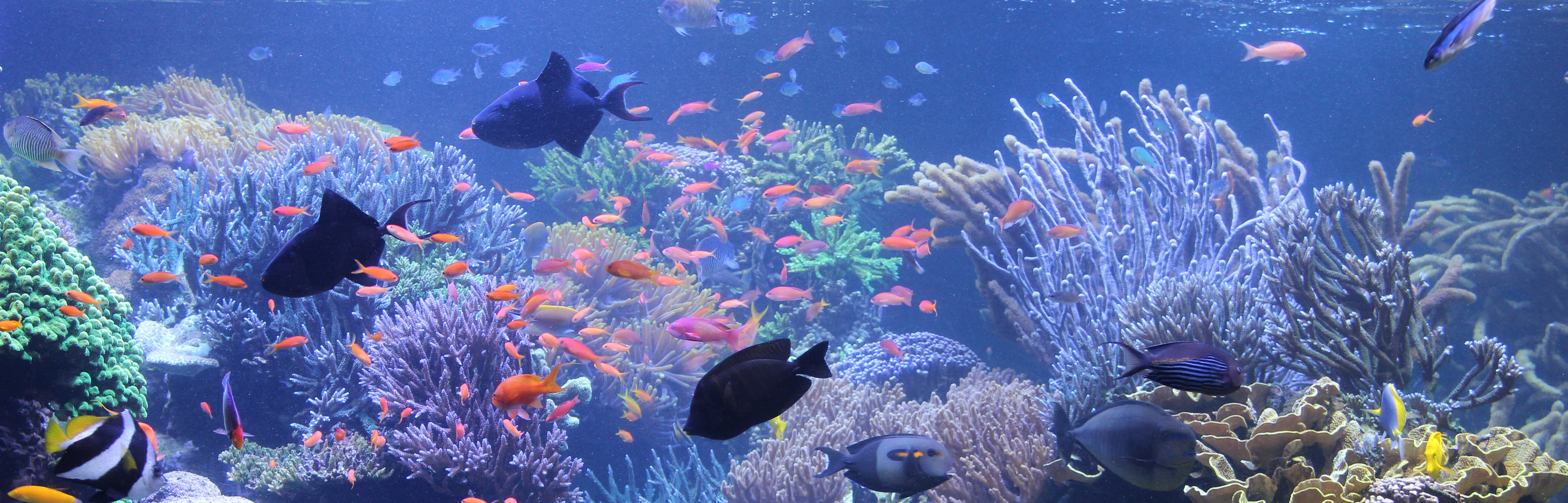
Long Island Aquarium's Coral Reef Exhibit is one of the largest all-living, closed system coral reef display in the Western Hemisphere.
