= Norstead (Newfoundland) =

Coordinates: 51.6018°N 55.5240°W

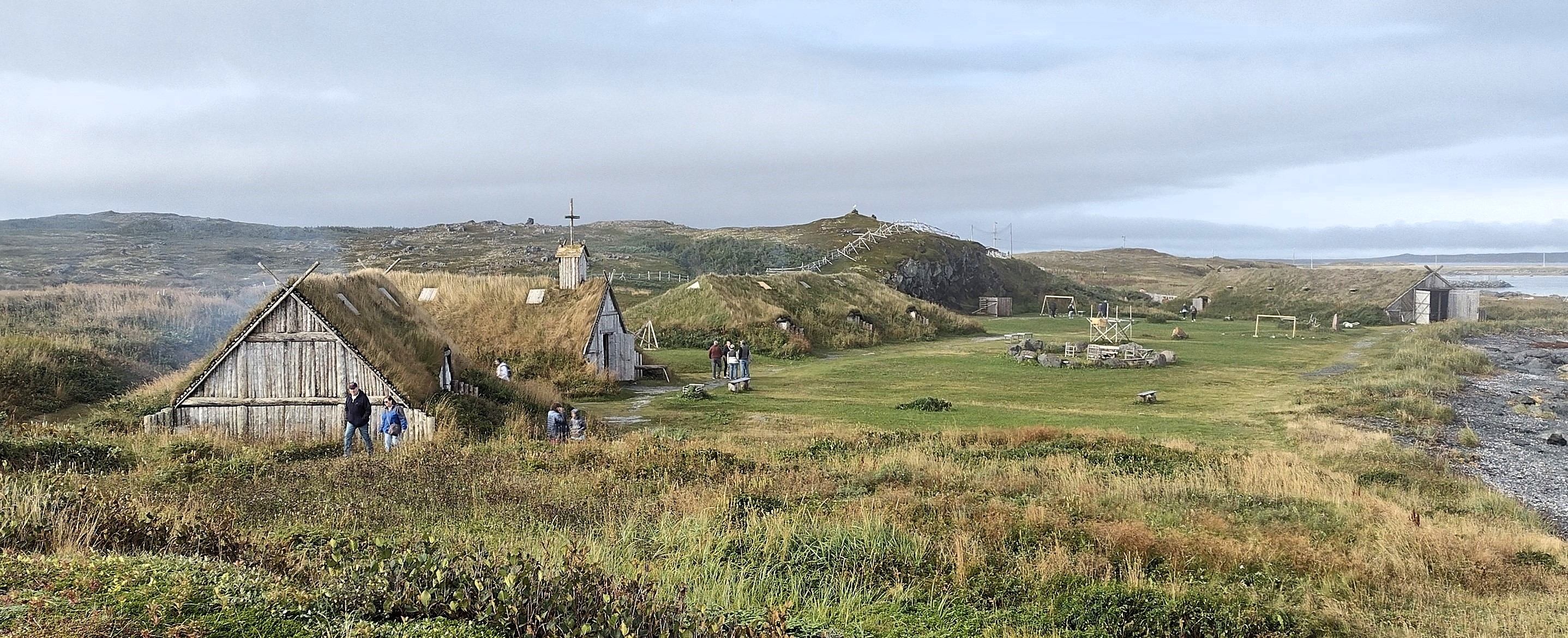
Overview of Norstead

Norstead: A Viking Village and Port of Trade is a reconstruction of a Viking Age settlement. Located near L'Anse aux Meadows in Newfoundland, Canada.

== History ==
Norstead has its origins in a 1998 voyage in which a 54-foot replica Viking knarr was sailed from Greenland to L’Anse aux Meadows with a crew of nine men.

The site, which opened in 2000, hosts the replica Viking knarr. That year, Norstead won the provincial Attractions Canada award for "Best New Attraction" and was the centerpiece of a series of events held in 2000 to commemorate the 1,000th anniversary of the Vikings' arrival in Newfoundland.
