= Reidville, Newfoundland and Labrador =

Reidville
- Town
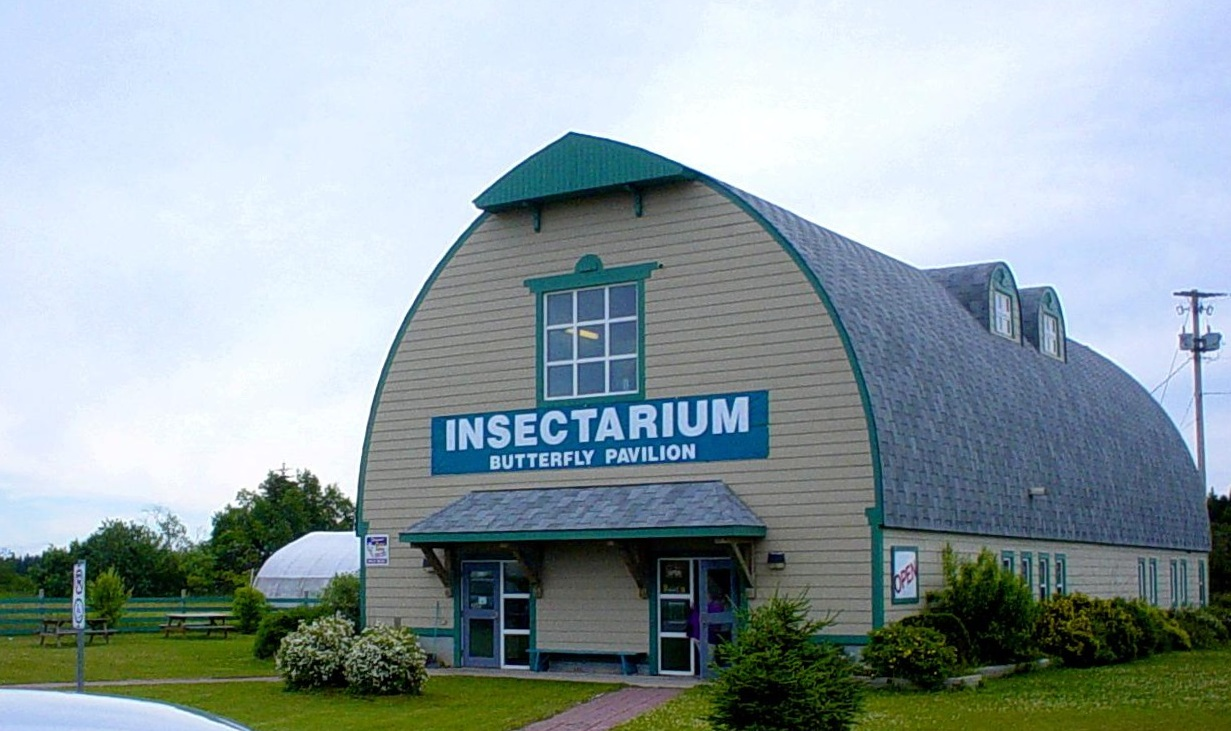
- Reidville is home to the Newfoundland Insectarium
- Interactive map of Reidville
- Coordinates: 49°15′34″N 57°22′03″W
- Country: Canada
- Province: Newfoundland and Labrador

Population (2021)
  - Total: 550
- Time zone: UTC-3:30 (Newfoundland Time)
  - Summer (DST): UTC-2:30 (Newfoundland Daylight)
- Area code: 709
- Website: www.reidville-nl.ca

Reidville is a village located north east of Deer Lake. A post office was established in 1967 and the first Postmisstress was Dorothy Barrett.

== Demographics ==
In the 2021 Census of Population conducted by Statistics Canada, Reidville had a population of 550 living in 232 of its 259 total private dwellings, a change of 8.1% from its 2016 population of 509. With a land area of 58.28 km^{2} (22.50 sq mi), it had a population density of 9.4/km^{2} (24.4/sq mi) in 2021.

== Insectarium ==
Reidville is home to the Newfoundland Insectarium and Butterfly Pavilion, which opened in 1998.

== See also ==
- List of cities and towns in Newfoundland and Labrador
- For the airport in Newfoundland and Labrador, see Deer Lake Regional Airport.
