= County Route 48 (Suffolk County, New York) =

County road in Suffolk County, New York, US

County Route 48
- Middle Road
- CR 48 highlighted in red

Route information
- Maintained by SCDPW
- Length: 13.60 mi (21.89 km)
- Existed: 1988–present

Major junctions
- West end: Sound Avenue in Mattituck
- East end: NY 25 north of Greenport

Location
- Country: United States
- State: New York
- County: Suffolk

Highway system
- County routes in New York; County Routes in Suffolk County

County Route 48 (CR 48) is a major east–west county road on the North Fork of Long Island in Suffolk County, New York, in the United States. It runs for 13.60 miles (21.89 km) from Sound Avenue in Mattituck to New York State Route 25 (NY 25) just outside the village of Greenport. The route is co-signed as NY 25 Truck, which continues west along Sound Avenue towards Laurel. CR 48 was originally designated as CR 27 when it became a county road in 1930 and was renumbered to CR 48 in 1988 to avoid confusion with New York State Route 27, which is the main thoroughfare on the South Fork of Long Island.

== Route description ==
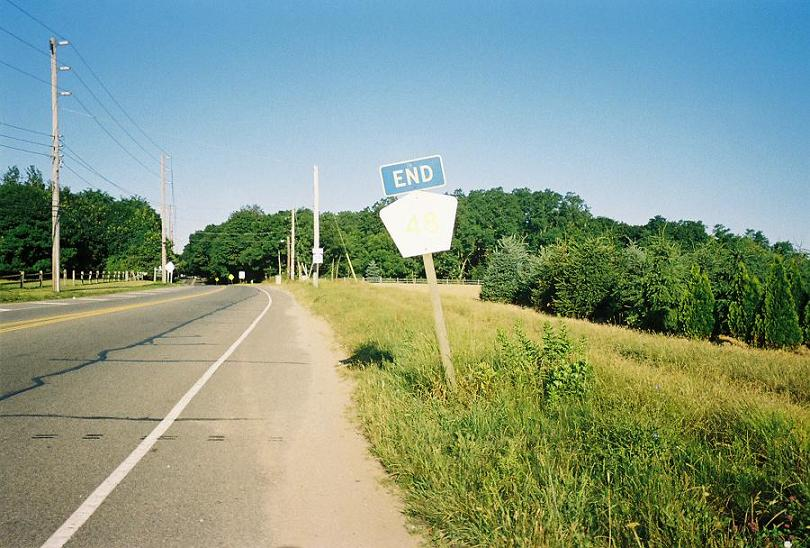
CR 48 ends at Sound Avenue in Mattituck, while NY 25 Truck continues westward.

CR 48, named Middle Road, starts just west of an at-grade intersection with Cox Neck Road and Sound Avenue west of the hamlet of Mattituck in the town of Southold. From there through Southold, the road becomes four lanes wide. Besides Wickham Avenue, the road intersects with Mill Lane (former CR 84) to Oregon; Elijah's Lane, which crosses the road after the east end of Wickham Avenue; Depot Lane in Cutchogue, which leads to both the former Cutchogue railroad station and Duck Pond Point; and Bridge Lane, which was named for a railroad bridge over the Main Line of the Long Island Rail Road.

In Peconic, the route intersects Mill and Peconic lanes (the latter is the main road to the former Peconic railroad station while the former leads to Goldsmith's Inlet County Park on the North Shore). East of Ackerly Pond Road in Southold, the road becomes two lanes wide. The first streets that the road encounters are Kenny's Road and Horton Lane, both of which have north shore beaches in their namesake. Unlike Kenny's Road, Horton Lane spans as far south as the Southold Town Hall on NY 25, as does Youngs Avenue, which leads to Southold's railroad station and the Horton Point Lighthouse.

The road takes a brief northeast turn at the intersection of Boisseau Avenue before moving back toward the east at North Road. As the road approaches Hashamomuck Pond, it replaces Sound View Avenue as the northernmost road on the North Fork. Sound View Avenue leads to Goldsmith's Inlet County Park, Peconic Dunes County Park, Horton Point Light and Hashamomuck Beach. Between Hashamomuck Pond and Greenport West, a section of Middle Road near a motel with the Long Island Sound in the back yard is still paved with concrete, as it was commonly done during the late 1920s and early 1930s. The section of old-fashioned pavement, however, is short-lived.

Along the border of Greenport, the road encounters a former KOA Campground, which today is the privately owned Eastern Long Island Kampground. It also runs along the southern border of Inlet Point County Park, and intersects Moore's Lane as it runs north of the village. CR 48 finally ends at NY 25 on the border between Greenport and Stirling, with CR 48's right of way continuing eastward toward Orient Point as NY 25. All of CR 48 is part of NY 25 Truck, a truck route of NY 25 that runs between Laurel and Greenport.

== History ==
CR 48 was added to the Suffolk County road system on January 27, 1930, as CR 27. The west end of the route was originally located in Mattituck, where it connected to New Middle Road, a newer section designated as CR 27A leading to Sound Avenue west of the hamlet. Within Mattituck, CR 27 followed Wickham Avenue. CR 27 was originally a two-lane road before the Suffolk County Department of Public Works (SCDPW) widened the west half of the route to four lanes in the early 1970s. A four-lane southerly bypass of Wickham Avenue was built as part of the project and designated CR 27B. In 1988, CR 27 was renumbered to CR 48 to eliminate numerical duplication with NY 27 on the South Shore of Long Island. CR 27A and CR 27B were both included in the new CR 48 while ownership and maintenance of Wickham Avenue was later turned over to the town of Southold.

Part of the reason SCDPW widened Middle Road was in anticipation of the formerly proposed North Fork extension of the Long Island Expressway (LIE). Once the expressway had been extended to the west end of CR 48 and Sound Avenue in Mattituck, CR 48 was to be upgraded into another segment of the LIE that would lead to a bridge either between East Marion and Old Saybrook, Connecticut, or from Orient Point to Watch Hill, Rhode Island. There was also a proposal to extend CR 48 west along Sound Avenue in anticipation of the formerly proposed Jamesport Nuclear Power Plant that was to be built by the Long Island Lighting Company. SCDPW's official description of CR 48 still lists part of Sound Avenue east of CR 105 as being part of CR 48, despite the fact that signage along the route indicates that Sound Avenue is the western terminus.

== Major intersections ==
Location	mi	km	Destinations	Notes
Mattituck	0.00	0.00	NY 25 Truck west (Sound Avenue)	Western terminus; western terminus of concurrency with NY 25 Truck
Mattituck	0.19	0.31	Cox Neck Road / Sound Avenue east	Former western terminus of CR 84; to Mattituck Station
Mattituck			Wickham Avenue to NY 25	Former western terminus of CR 27B
Mattituck			Mill Lane	Former CR 84
Mattituck			Wickham Avenue	Former eastern terminus of CR 27B
Greenport West	12.80	20.60	Moores Lane – Shelter Island	Alternate routing of NY 25 Truck
Greenport	13.30	21.40	NY 25 – Greenport, Orient	Eastern terminus; eastern terminus of NY 25 Truck
1.000 mi = 1.609 km; 1.000 km = 0.621 mi: Concurrency terminus
