= Laurel station (LIRR) =

Former train station in New York, US

Laurel
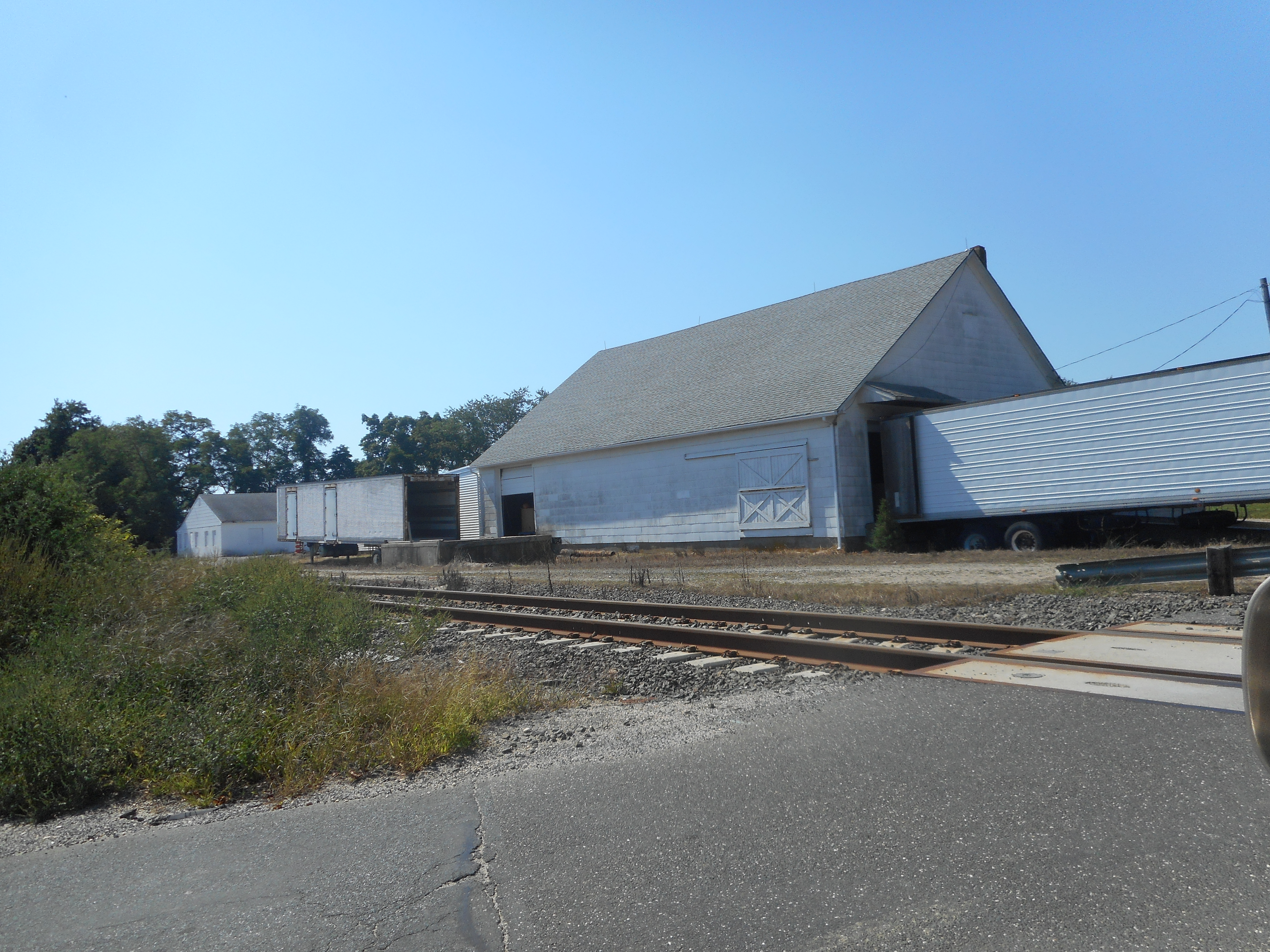
- Approximate site of the former Laurel station

General information
- Location: Laurel Lane; Laurel, New York
- Coordinates: 40.962386°N 72.562567°W
- Owner: Long Island Rail Road
- Line: Main Line
- Platforms: 2
- Tracks: 1

History
- Closed: May 22, 1966
- Rebuilt: 1901
- Former names: Franklinville

Former services
Preceding station	Long Island Rail Road	Following station
Jamesport toward Long Island City or Penn Station	Main Line	Mattituck toward Greenport
Location

Laurel, originally Franklinville, was a station stop along the Greenport Branch of the Long Island Rail Road in Laurel, New York.

== History ==
The first depot was built in the hamlet of Franklinville. The area was renamed after securing a post office in February 1898. The name had to be changed as there already was a Franklinville in Cattaraugus County, NY. The residents voted to choose the name "Laurel" after the local lake. The station is first mentioned in the Gazetteer of the State of New York in 1872, so it was likely constructed around that time.

In light of the farming, gardening, small fruit raising, and cultivation of root crops, the Franklinville freight depot was established by 1872. The building was renovated in the summer of 1879 to afford better accommodations for eventual passenger service. It was reported in 1887 that the total number of barrels of cauliflower carted from the depot was 3,762. More regular passenger service appears on timetables in April 1891, then disappears only to reappear in September 1892. The service again disappears but reappears in June 1894. It is listed as Franklinville as late as Employee Timetable #3 from June 1897, when the superintendent of the LIRR ordered that names be the same as the postal jurisdiction. In the fall of 1895, new interior floors and new roof shingles were installed as well as new platform planks. With the opening of the Laurel Post Office, the name changed and by the summer of 1898, timetables reflected the modifications with Franklinville remaining in parentheses. Thereafter it was simply Laurel.

A new shack style depot replaced the 1870s structure in 1901. In 1910, the small wooden building was the setting for a controversy between the LIRR and the Post Office as to who should haul the mail from the station because of the location of the depot’s entry. Tape measure revealed that it was the railroad’s responsibility. However, a second door was then cut into the depot making it the Post Office’s obligation.

Due to the long distance to New York City and the fact there was no high-speed electric service in the area, commuter ridership at Riverhead town stations such as Laurel was minimal. Statistics from the winter of 1930 reveal that there were no daily commuters to western LIRR terminals, and there was no change the following winter. The low numbers at Laurel forced the railroad to take action. As early as 1925, the LIRR petitioned the New York State Public Service Commission (PSC) to allow for the discontinuation of its Laurel station agent, but the PSC denied the request on July 14, 1925. The LIRR finally won their request in May 1938 and was allowed to close the Laurel agency. The stipulation was that the company maintain suitable facilities for the receipt of carload and less-than-carload shipments of freight, and for minimal passenger service. Since it was now a non-agency station, it was placed under control of nearby Mattituck. By early 1939, the Laurel depot was made into a shelter by boarding up the windows and removing the track-side wall.

On February 19, 1962, LIRR Road ‘n Rail began with no bus stop for Laurel. A discontinuation of select rail service began and as a result, signaled the beginning of the end of train service to Laurel. Prior to the MTA takeover, the railroad ended mail transportation services on June 18, 1965. Newspapers however were still carried on the railroad, and delivery was still provided weekdays to Laurel on the following trains in the fall of 1965: number 204 eastbound in Laurel at 11:20 a.m., and number 211 westbound in Laurel at 3:27 p.m. Service was provided on Saturdays on the eastbound morning train number 4206 and the afternoon westbound number 4211. It would be the last service of any kind to the community. The following spring, the newspaper stops were removed from the daily schedule. Laurel remained listed on employee timetables through May 1966 but on timetables dated May 22, 1967 they were dropped. With service ended the shelter was razed in 1967.
