= Horton Point =

Horton Point may refer to:

- Horton Point Light - a lighthouse on the north side of Eastern Long Island, New York near Southold.
- Horton Point LLC - a quantitative investment firm in New York City.
- Horton Point (horse) - the winner of the 1994 Badminton Horse Trials.
