= Greenport =

Greenport may refer any of the following

== Netherlands ==
- Greenport (Netherlands), a cluster of economic areas focussed around horticulture facilities and production

== United States ==
- Greenport, Columbia County, New York
- Greenport, Suffolk County, New York
  - Greenport (LIRR station)
- Greenport West, New York
