= Ronkonkoma Branch =

Long Island Rail Road branch

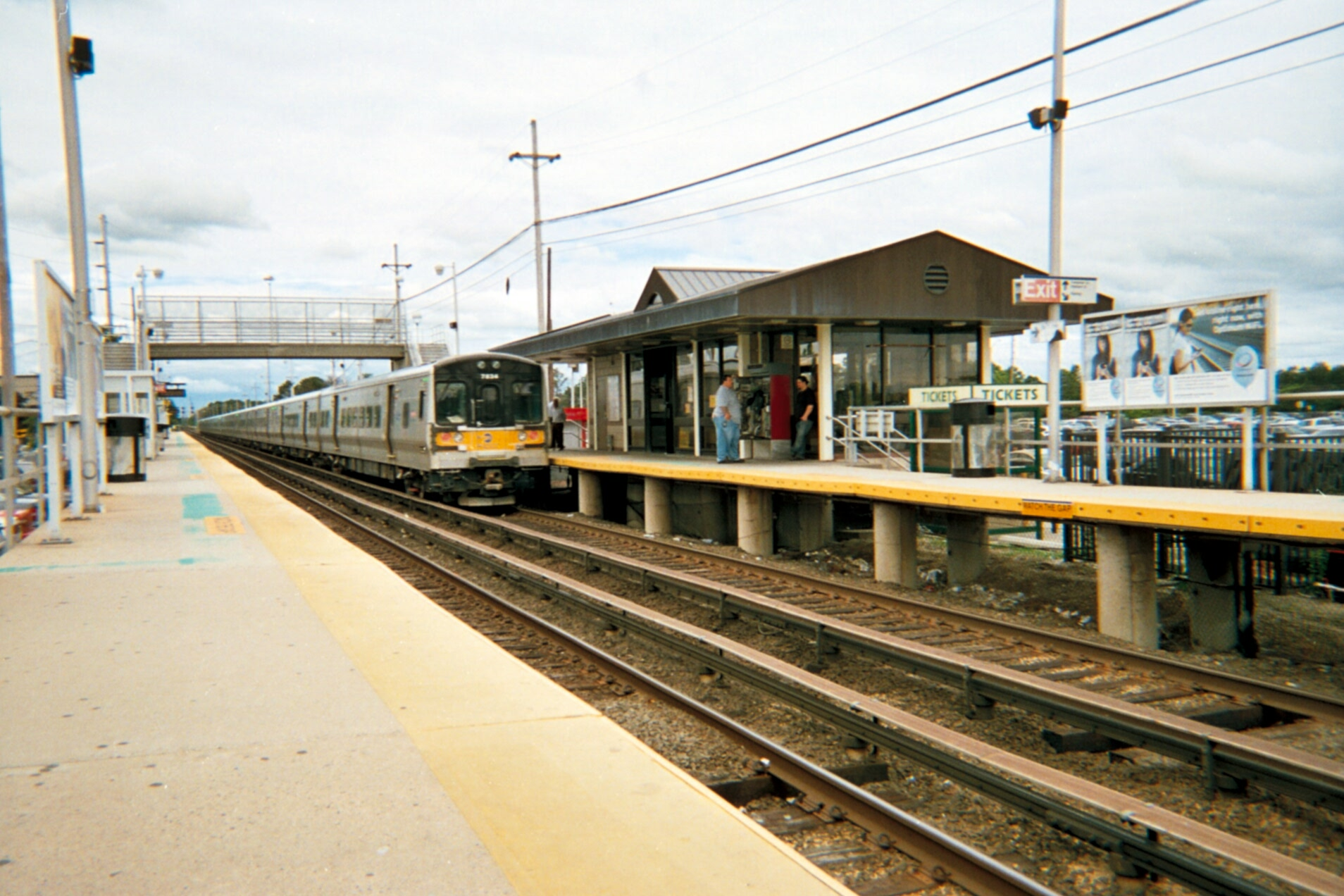
- A Penn Station-bound train of M7 cars leaves Deer Park

Overview
- Status: Operational
- Owner: Long Island Rail Road
- Locale: Nassau and Suffolk County, New York, USA
- Termini: Hicksville; Ronkonkoma Greenport
- Stations: 14

Service
- Type: Commuter rail
- System: Long Island Rail Road
- Services: Ronkonkoma Branch; Greenport Branch
- Operator: Metropolitan Transportation Authority
- Rolling stock: Budd M3, Bombardier M7, Kawasaki M9 (West of Ronkonkoma); Kawasaki C3, DE30AC (East of Ronkonkoma)
- Ridership: 9,135,604 (annual ridership, 2025)

History
- Opened: 1837-1844

Technical
- Track gauge: 4 ft 8 1/2 in (1,435 mm) standard gauge
- Electrification: Third rail, 750 V DC (west of Ronkonkoma)
Route map
- Distances shown from Long Island City

The Ronkonkoma Branch is a rail service operated by the Long Island Rail Road (LIRR) in the U.S. state of New York. On LIRR maps and printed schedules, the "Ronkonkoma Branch" includes trains running along the railroad's Main Line from Hicksville (where the Port Jefferson Branch leaves the Main Line) to Ronkonkoma, and between Ronkonkoma and the Main Line's eastern terminus at Greenport. The section of the Main Line east of Ronkonkoma is not electrified and is referred to as the Greenport Branch.

The western segment between Hicksville and Ronkonkoma sees 24-hour service to Penn Station and Grand Central Madison in New York City. The eastern segment between Ronkonkoma and Greenport is served by diesel-electric trains, and only sees a handful of trips each day. The eastern segment is also the only dark territory area of the Long Island Rail Road, meaning that it does not have signals.

== Segments ==
=== Hicksville to Ronkonkoma ===
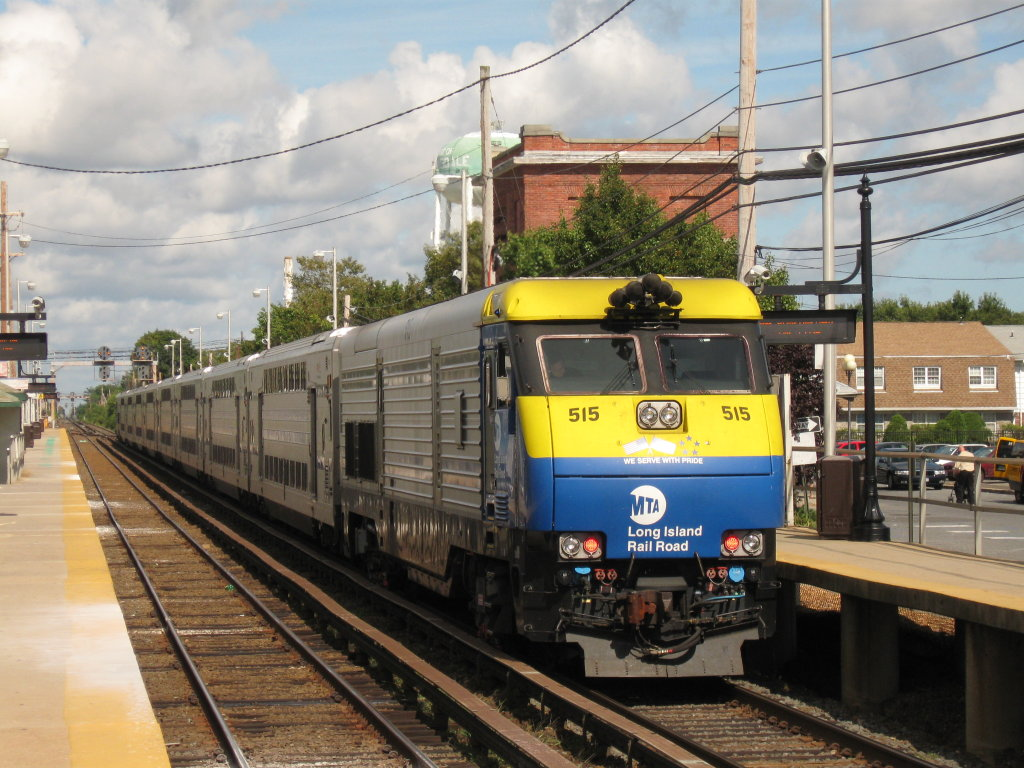
Train #8054 at Farmingdale, using diesel locomotives due to construction

The western segment of the line from Hicksville to Ronkonkoma was electrified in 1987, creating a one-seat ride to Penn Station. Formerly, service on this segment was provided by diesel trains, which could not enter Penn Station, requiring a transfer. Average rush-hour trip time from Ronkonkoma to Penn Station decreased from 97 minutes pre-electrification (including the mandatory transfer from a diesel to an electric train) to 71 minutes afterwards.

The $168.5 million project attracted many new passengers. A survey of peak-hour Ronkonkoma Branch passengers conducted by the LIRR in April 1988 found that 42 percent of the branch's passengers were new to the line: 34 percent switched from other lines (the Port Jefferson and Montauk Branches), 6 percent were new to the LIRR as a whole and 2 percent recently returned to the LIRR. By September 1988, over 2,000 new riders during the morning rush hour had switched to the Ronkonkoma Branch, much of which occurred in the first month after electrification, faster than the LIRR expected. Commuters complained that the expanded parking facilities at Ronkonkoma built in anticipation of electrification were overcrowded and already inadequate, and that double-parking and vandalism were rampant.

In the decades since, the amount of parking at Ronkonkoma has expanded. In 2012, the Metropolitan Transportation Authority (MTA) started adding a second track to the line between Farmingdale and Ronkonkoma to increase capacity. The project was ultimately completed in 2018.

=== Greenport Branch ===
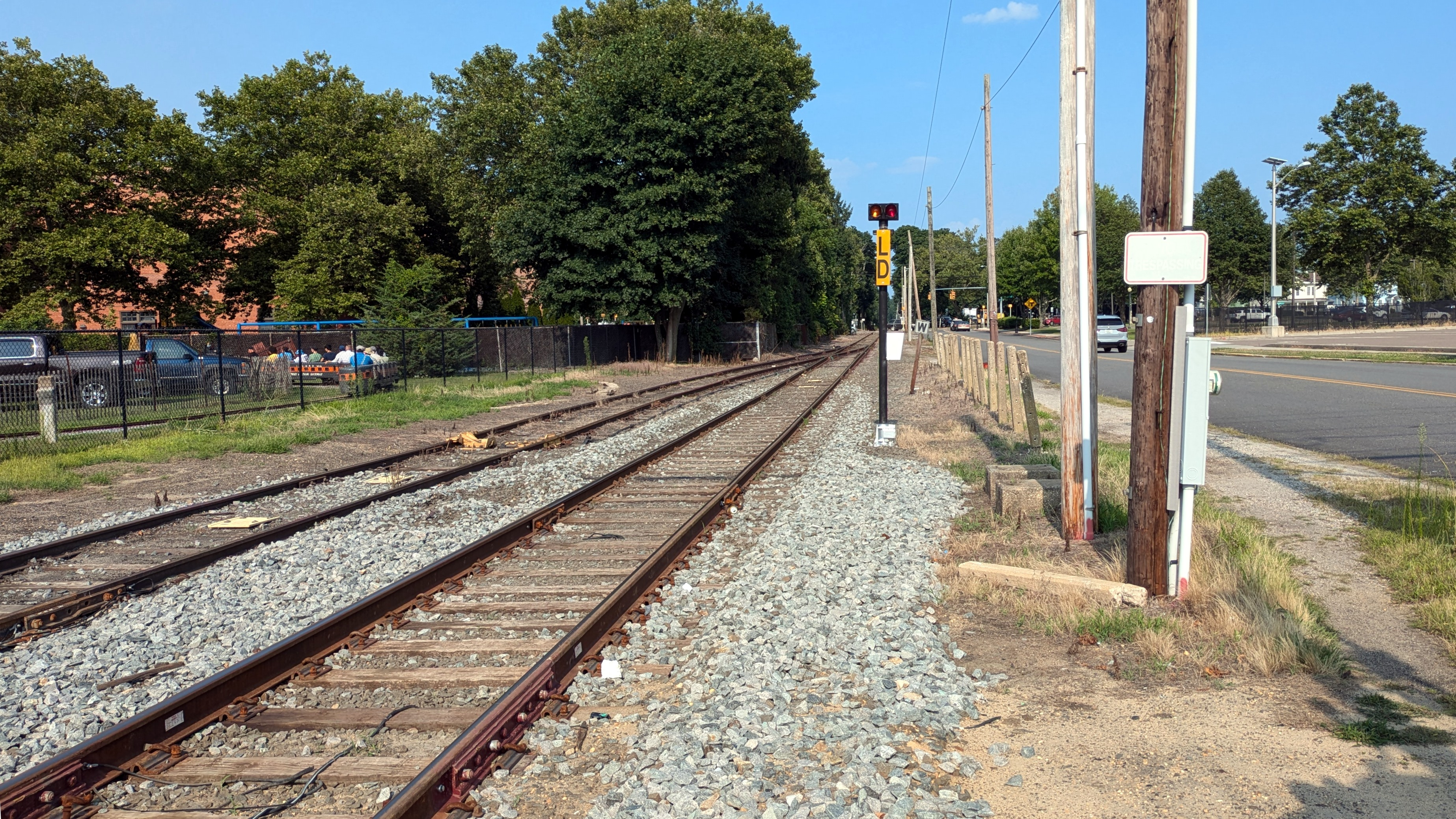
Block limit marker at Riverhead station, in unelectrified dark territory

The 46-mile (74 km) segment between Ronkonkoma and Greenport, known as the Greenport Branch, is the only remaining dark territory area on the Long Island Rail Road, meaning that it does not have signals. The relatively small amount of train movements on this segment are governed by train orders and timetable authority. This segment is served by diesel-electric "scoots", all of which terminate at Ronkonkoma, requiring customers traveling west of Ronkonkoma to transfer there. Three eastbound and four westbound scoots travel each weekday between Ronkonkoma and Greenport. Also, one additional round trip is scheduled between Ronkonkoma and Riverhead (formerly Yaphank) each weekday. Weekend service consists of four round-trips each day between Ronkonkoma and Greenport. On Fridays during the summer, the eastbound trip to Riverhead is extended to Greenport, and the westbound run from Riverhead to Ronkonkoma does not operate. Also, during summers between 2016 and 2022, an additional evening trip ran from Greenport to Jamaica, running express between Ronkonkoma and Jamaica; this was the only Greenport scoot trip to serve the New York City terminals.

The Greenport Branch has the lowest ridership among LIRR services for which data is available. In 2018, the LIRR's second–least used service (the West Hempstead Branch) had more than 14 times as many riders as the Greenport Branch did; in the same year, Greenport Branch riders accounted for 0.08% of LIRR ridership overall. The LIRR has cited these ridership trends in attempts to end service east of Ronkonkoma. In 2010, the idea was entertained by the financially troubled MTA, who proposed eliminating all scoot service except for the popular summer weekend service. Ultimately, weekday service remained, but weekend service outside of the summer season (defined as Memorial Day-Columbus Day) was discontinued. In 2013, the span of weekend service was extended to operate from the first weekend in May to the last weekend in November. In 2016, the LIRR restored year-long weekend service between Ronkonkoma and Greenport.

=== Central Branch ===
Some LIRR maps also include as part of the Ronkonkoma Branch the non-electrified Central Branch, which splits from the Ronkonkoma Branch east of Bethpage and connects with the more southern Montauk Branch, just west of Babylon. There are no stations along this stretch, and it is mainly used by trains with diesel-electric engines going express from Jamaica to Babylon. No trains using this track appear on Ronkonkoma Branch schedules; they appear on Montauk Branch and Babylon Branch schedules, and some appear on schedules for Mineola and Hicksville on the Main Line, if a stop is scheduled there.

== History and current projects ==
=== Greenport enhancements ===
Despite proposing to eliminate most service east of Ronkonkoma, the MTA is enhancing the segment's infrastructure. The LIRR is required to install a positive train control signaling system on all its trackage by the end of 2018. The MTA initially budgeted $29 million in its 2015–2019 capital program to add signals along the 10 mile segment from Ronkonkoma to Yaphank. This upgrade would install signals, track circuits and automatic speed control (ASC). However, in a 2017 amendment of the capital program, the agency postponed the construction of the new signal system, only including $2 million to fund design. After positive train control was activated on the easternmost portion of the Montauk Branch in November 2017, the Greenport Branch became the only portion of the LIRR that lacked positive train control.

In its 2015–2034 20-Year Capital Needs Assessment, the MTA describes extending electrification eastward from Ronkonkoma to Yaphank or Riverhead, as well as the addition of a second track between Ronkonkoma and Yaphank as long-term needs. However, the MTA cites the high cost of electrification and other components as a barrier to present-day action. If electrification were to be extended eastward, stations would also need upgrading, since all station platforms east of Ronkonkoma are only long enough to fit one-and-a-half train cars.

=== Second track between Farmingdale and Ronkonkoma ===
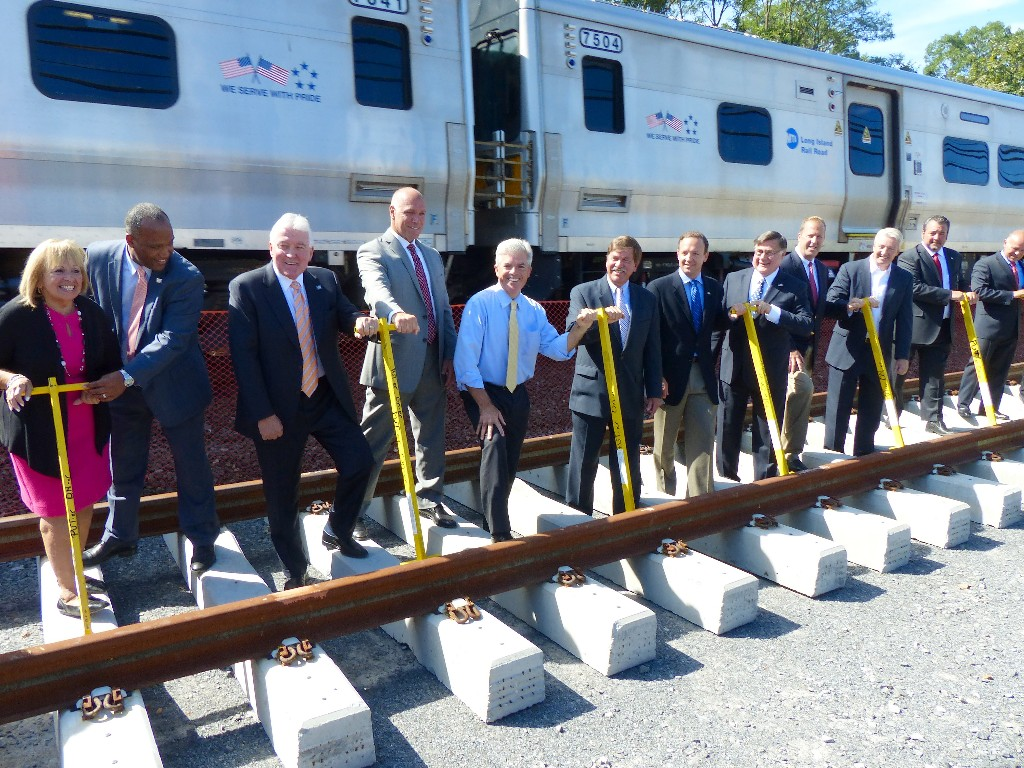
Groundbreaking for Phase 1

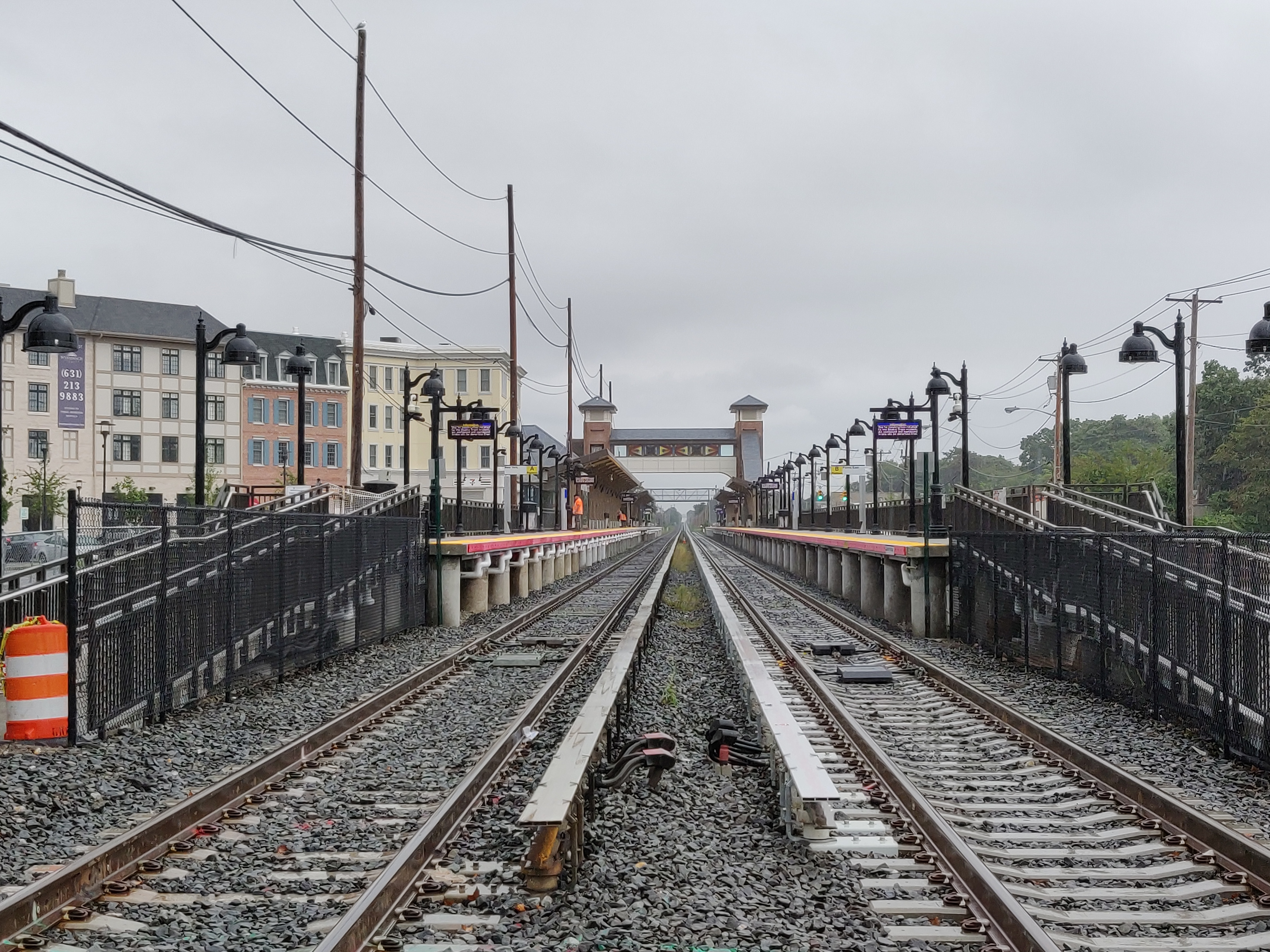
The completed second track, as viewed from the reconstructed Wyandanch station

In 2012, the MTA approved a project to build a second track between Ronkonkoma and Farmingdale. At the time, the only areas east of Farmingdale with two tracks were the segment between Deer Park and Brentwood stations, inclusive; at Central Islip station; and at Ronkonkoma station. Construction of the double track occurred on land that the LIRR has owned since the 1980s, when the land was acquired for the electrification project. The double track project also included upgrades to switches, grade crossings, and station facilities. This project increased operational flexibility by enabling reverse-peak service between Farmingdale and Ronkonkoma and increased off-peak service between Hicksville and Ronkonkoma, with service able to operate half-hourly instead of just hourly. This additional capacity allows the Main Line to better serve as a substitute for South Shore lines in case of a disturbance caused by extreme weather. With the use of the New Track Construction (NTC) method, rail was laid down ten times faster than regular track laying methods, saving $7 million, and allowing the project to be completed 16 months ahead of schedule.

Work on the two-phase project began in August 2015. As part of Phase 1, the section from Ronkonkoma to Central Islip, consisting of 4 miles (6.4 km) of track, was built to the north of the existing track. This section was laid using a NTC machine, followed by the installation of third rail. The southern track at Central Islip was extended to Brentwood to the south of the existing track. Phase 1 was completed in August 2016. As part of Phase 2, a second track was added between Deer Park, through Wyandanch, and past Pinelawn to the east end of FARM interlocking at Republic to the south of the existing track. A design–build contract for this phase was awarded in June 2016. This phase also involved rehabilitating grade crossings, demolishing pedestrian bridges, and building a second platform Wyandanch. Starting in August 2016, to accommodate the second track, supports were pile-driven into the existing embankment near the old site of the Deer Park station, brush was, and embankment was added between Pinelawn and the grade crossing at Little East Neck Road. The last five miles of track were added in January 2018, and the LIRR began connecting the new second track to the existing double-track segments in spring 2018.

The entire project cost $387.2 million and was completed in September 2018, over a year ahead of schedule. As indicated in the MTA's 2015–2034 Capital Needs Assessment, the MTA will extend the double-track to Yaphank if funding is available. This will allow the LIRR to provide additional service in diesel territory, thereby saving travel time.

=== Mid-Suffolk Yard ===
In 2015, the MTA conducted environmental studies to determine the impact of expanding the existing rail yard in Ronkonkoma. This expansion, called the Mid-Suffolk Yard, will add 11 new tracks, increasing the number of total tracks from 12 at present to 23. The expansion will use space already owned by the MTA located immediately to the south of the existing rail yard and north of MacArthur Airport. The increase in storage space will allow the MTA to increase peak-hour service once East Side Access is complete and service to Grand Central begins. The project is budgeted for $76.6 million. Locations in Deer Park, Central Islip, and Yaphank were also considered for the construction of the yard. The Deer Park option was dismissed as it would have impacted several grade crossings, duplicated employee facilities and as it would not have benefited riders east of the station. The Central Islip site was dismissed as it would have been located in Connetquot River State Park. The Yaphank option was rejected because of the high cost of electrification and the requirement that Medford and Yaphank stations receive upgrades. Construction was expected to be finished by late 2018, but the completion date was pushed back to September 2020.

=== Possible reopening of Republic station ===
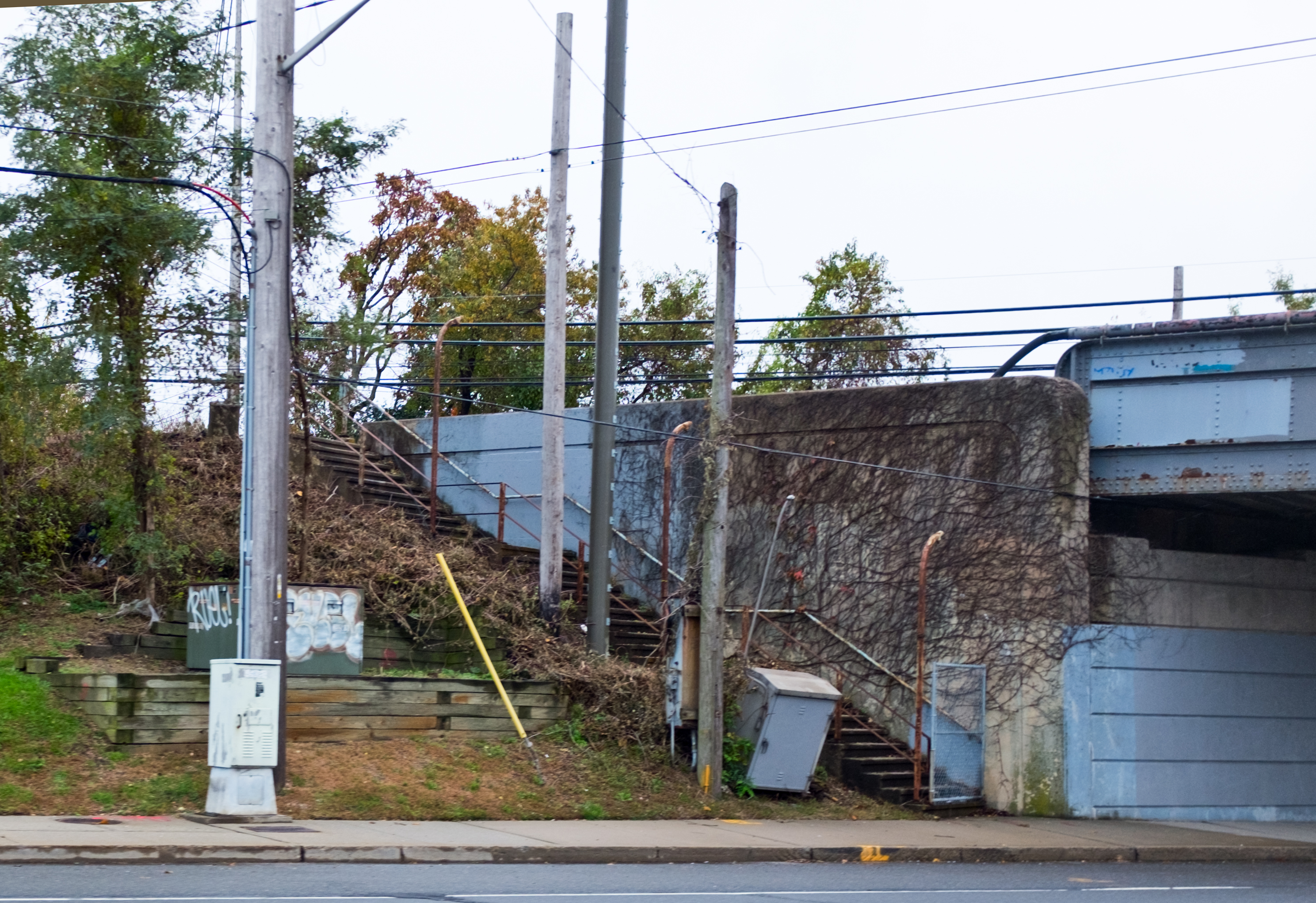
Staircase to former Republic station

The MTA plans to reopen Republic station, which is located between Farmingdale and Pinelawn. The station closed in 1987 as part of the electrification project between Hicksville and Ronkonkoma, and was only used by about a dozen riders daily, not making it cost-effective to upgrade the station to support electric railcars. However, since its closure, there has been an increased amount of commercial and residential development along the Route 110 corridor near the station, a major north–south commercial route. The reopened station would serve this corridor. Funding for the station was deferred from the MTA's 2010–2014 budget due to budgetary issues, but was revived in 2012. The MTA budgeted $5 million in 2015 to design a new station and carry out environmental studies, although construction itself has not been funded yet. The rebuilt station will have two new 12-car platforms, and ADA-compliant ramps.

=== Third track between Floral Park and Hicksville ===
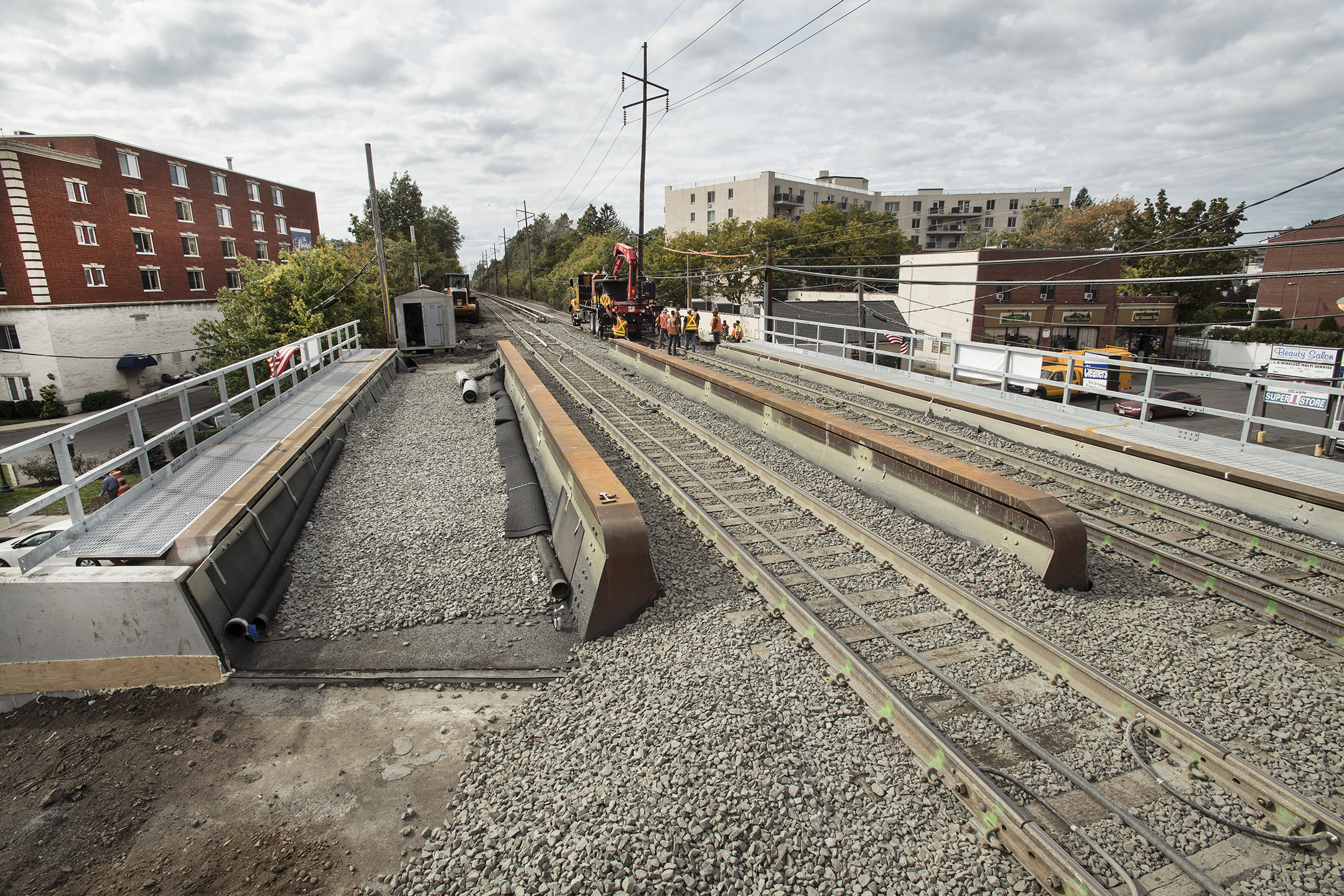
The Post Avenue Bridge near Westbury station, which was replaced in October 2017 to accommodate a third track

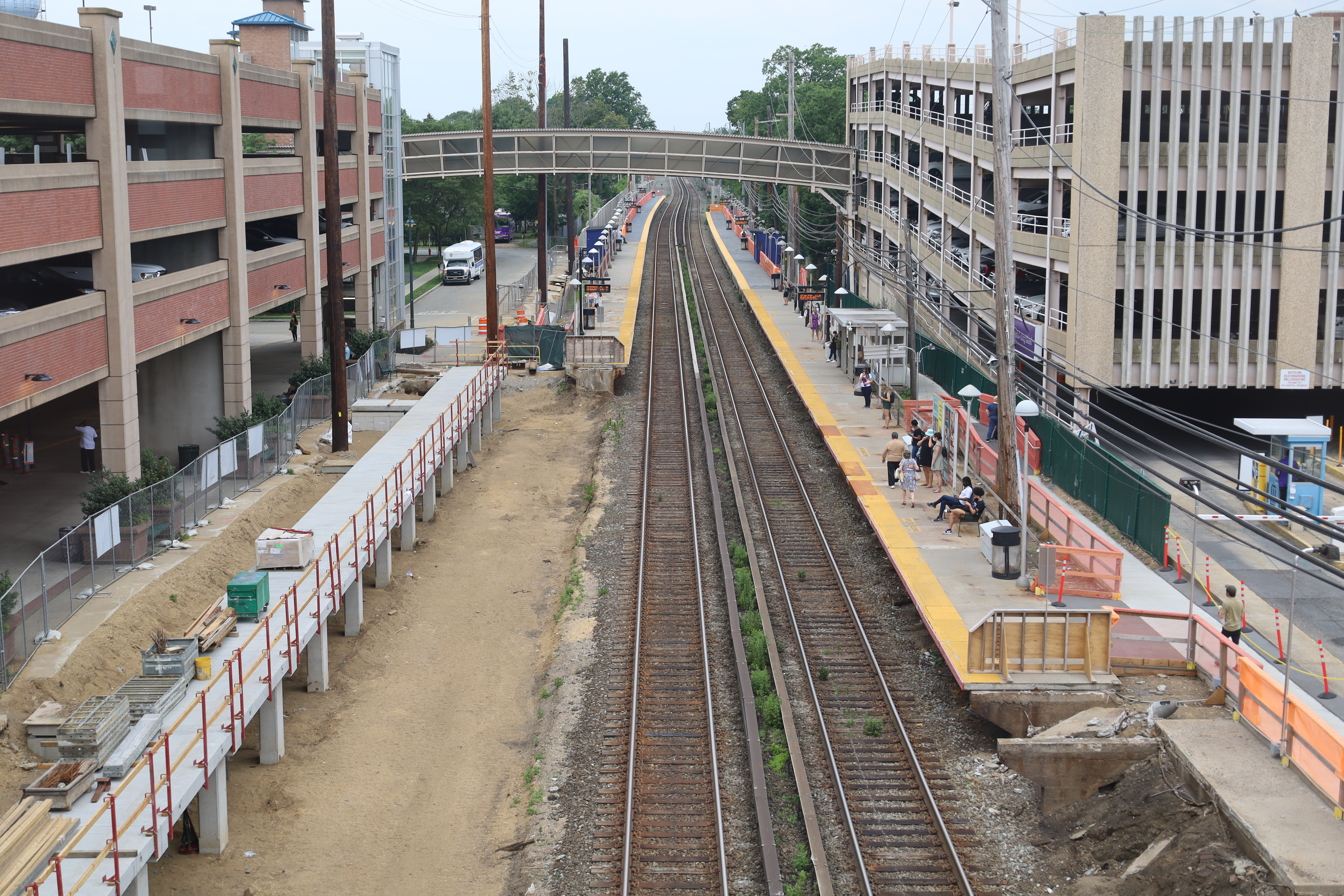
Construction of new platforms at the Mineola station in 2021 to accommodate the third track

To accommodate a projected increase in Long Island Rail Road ridership following completion of the East Side Access project to Grand Central Terminal, and to expand local and reverse-peak service, a third track was built on the Main Line between Floral Park and Hicksville. The construction project, also known as the LIRR Expansion Project, included purchasing properties in the track's right of way, eliminating grade crossings (in conjunction with New York State Department of Transportation), relocating existing stations, and reconfiguring Mineola Station. The project was stalled by fierce opposition from the villages of Floral Park, New Hyde Park, and Garden City, which advocated that construction and the resulting increased train service will reduce the quality of life in their neighborhoods. These villages did, however, support the station improvements and the elimination of grade crossings that the LIRR has planned in conjunction with the third track, and called for the LIRR to complete them in lieu of third track expansion, but the MTA has long insisted that a third track is a necessary component of LIRR's East Side Access expansion. In March 2015, LIRR president Patrick Nowakowski declared that the LIRR would not proceed with the project without the support of the local communities.

Small segments of the third track already existed: one segment between Merillon Avenue and Mineola, built in the vicinity of Herricks Road during the grade crossing elimination project that took place in 1998, and another was built during a 2014–2018 renovation project at Hicksville station, which connected Track 1 at Hicksville station to the North Siding track located about 3,000 feet (910 m) west of the station. This short segment would eventually become the eastern end of the Third Track, and already allowed for a slight increase in peak-hour service upon its completion. The MTA had also left provisions for a third track in construction of other infrastructure along the line, such as the Mineola Intermodal Center located adjacent to Mineola station, Mineola Boulevard Bridge, Roslyn Road Underpass in Mineola, and the replacement Ellison Avenue Bridge over the Main Line in Westbury.

In January 2016, Governor Andrew Cuomo announced a transportation improvement plan which included several million dollars in funding to restart third track development. Governor Cuomo said that unlike previous third track proposals, his plan would involve building the third track within existing LIRR right of way, which would reduce the number of existing homes and businesses affected by installation of the third track. While previous proposals would have affected around 250 properties, 80 of which were homes, Governor Cuomo's proposal would only require taking small amounts of property from 50 properties in total, including around 20 homes. This reduction in properties affected was accomplished by shifting the alignments of tracks in some areas to make room for the third track within the right-of-way and building a shorter third track than previous proposals, resulting in a 9.8-mile (15.8 km) three-track segment starting at Floral Park (the easternmost station shared by the Hempstead Branch and Main Line, where the Hempstead Branch and Main Line split from a 4-track corridor into two distinct pairs of tracks), instead of the previously planned 11.5-mile (18.5 km) segment starting from Queens Village. Despite the promise of mitigation efforts, several local politicians denounced the governor's plan within a day of its announcement; Floral Park's mayor told The New York Times that "we thought this was dead and buried", while New Hyde Park's mayor pledged to "fight the governor vehemently on this" and a local state senator called the governor's plan "dead on arrival."

In December 2017, the LIRR awarded a contract for the project to the consortium 3rd Track Constructors for $1.8 billion, with construction beginning in 2018 and completion estimated for 2022. The first part of the contract included the reconstruction of the Carle Place, Mineola, and Floral Park stations; the construction or reconstruction of six railroad crossings and underpasses; and the construction of a parking structure at Mineola station. A groundbreaking ceremony for the Third Track project was held on September 5, 2018. All eight grade crossings in the Third Track construction area were removed by February 2021. The first phase of the third track opened on August 15, 2022, and a second phase opened on August 30. The entirety of the third track was complete by October 3, 2022.

== Stations ==
West of Mineola, trips typically terminate at Penn Station or during rush hours, Grand Central Madison.

Zone	Location	Station name	Miles (km) from LIC	Date opened	Date closed	Connections and notes
4	Mineola	Mineola	18.6 (29.9)	1837		Long Island Rail Road: ■ Montauk Branch, ■ Port Jefferson Branch, ■ Oyster Bay Branch; Nassau Inter-County Express: n15, n22, n22X, n23, n24, n40, n40X; Originally named Hempstead, then Branch or Hempstead Branch
7	Hicksville	Hicksville	24.8 (39.9)	1837		Long Island Rail Road: ■ Montauk Branch, ■ Port Jefferson Branch; Nassau Inter-County Express: n20H, n22, n24, n48, n49, n78, n79, n80 Suffolk County Transit: Long Island Express
7	Bethpage					
7	Bethpage	Grumman		1942	1985	
7	Bethpage	Bethpage	27.9 (44.9)	c. 1854		Originally named Jerusalem, then Central Park
7	Bethpage	Bethpage Junction		1873		
7	Farmingdale	Farmingdale	30.2 (48.6)	1841		Nassau Inter-County Express: n70
9	Farmingdale					
9	East Farmingdale					
9	East Farmingdale	Republic		1940	1987	
9	East Farmingdale	Pinelawn (limited service)	32.4 (52.1)	c. 1890		
9	Wyandanch	Wyandanch	34.7 (55.8)	1875		Suffolk County Transit: 3, 4, 12; Originally named West Deer Park, then Wyandance
9	Baywood					
9	Baywood	Edgewood		1892	1914	
9	Baywood	Deer Park	38.4 (61.8)	1842		Suffolk County Transit: 4, 5 Tanger Shuttle Bus
9	Brentwood					
9	Brentwood	Thompson		1842	1869	
9	Brentwood	Pineaire		1915	1986	
10	Brentwood	Brentwood	41.1 (66.1)	1870		Suffolk County Transit: 4, 5, 7, 11, 58; Originally named Modern Times
10	Central Islip					
10	Central Islip	Suffolk		1842	1873	
10	Central Islip	Central Islip	43.6 (70.2)	1873		Suffolk County Transit: 4, 6, 17, 52A, 52B
10	Islandia	Nichols Road				
10	Ronkonkoma					
10	Ronkonkoma	Lakeland		1843	1883	Originally named Lake Road
10	Ronkonkoma	Ronkonkoma	48.5 (78.1)	1883		Suffolk County Transit: 51, 52A, 52B, Ronkonkoma On-Demand Zone, Long Island Express Bus; Terminus of electrification, originally named Lake Ronkonkoma
10	Ronkonkoma	Hermanville		1850		
10	Holbrook	Holbrook		1907	1962	
10	Holtsville	Holtsville		1843	1998	Originally named Waverly
10	Medford	Medford	54.1 (87.1)	June 26, 1844		Suffolk County Transit: 55
10	Yaphank					
10	Yaphank	Bartlett's		1844		Originally Bellport
10	Yaphank	Fire Place		June 26, 1844	1845	
12	Yaphank	Yaphank	58.6 (94.3)	1844	July 18, 2026	Originally named Milleville, Replaced by Yaphank–BNL
12	East Yaphank	Yaphank–BNL	61.6 (99.1)	July 18, 2026		
12	East Yaphank	Carman's River		June 26, 1844	1845	
12	Upton	Upton Road		1918	1922	
12	Upton	Camp Upton		1917	1922	
12	Manorville	Wampmissic		c. 1847–1848		
12	Manorville	Manorville		July 29, 1844	c. 1968	Originally named St. George's Manor, then Manor
12	Calverton	Calverton		1852 1880	1858 c. 1958	Originally named Hulse Turnout, then Baiting Hollow
14	Riverhead	Riverhead	73.3 (118.0)	July 29, 1844		Suffolk County Transit: 58, 62, 66, 80, 92, Long Island Express
14	Aquebogue	Aquebogue		1892	1967	
14	Jamesport	Jamesport		1844	April 30, 1984	
14	Laurel	Laurel		1901	1967	
14	Mattituck	Mattituck	82.4 (132.6)	July 29, 1844		Suffolk County Transit: 92
14	Cutchogue	Cutchogue		1844	April 30, 1984	
14	Peconic	Peconic		1844	c. 1970	Originally named Hermitage
14	Southold	Southold	90.1 (145.0)	1844		Suffolk County Transit: 92
14	Greenport	Greenport	94.3 (151.8)	July 29, 1844		Suffolk County Transit: 92; North Ferry
