= Jamesport station =

Former train station in New York, US

Jamesport
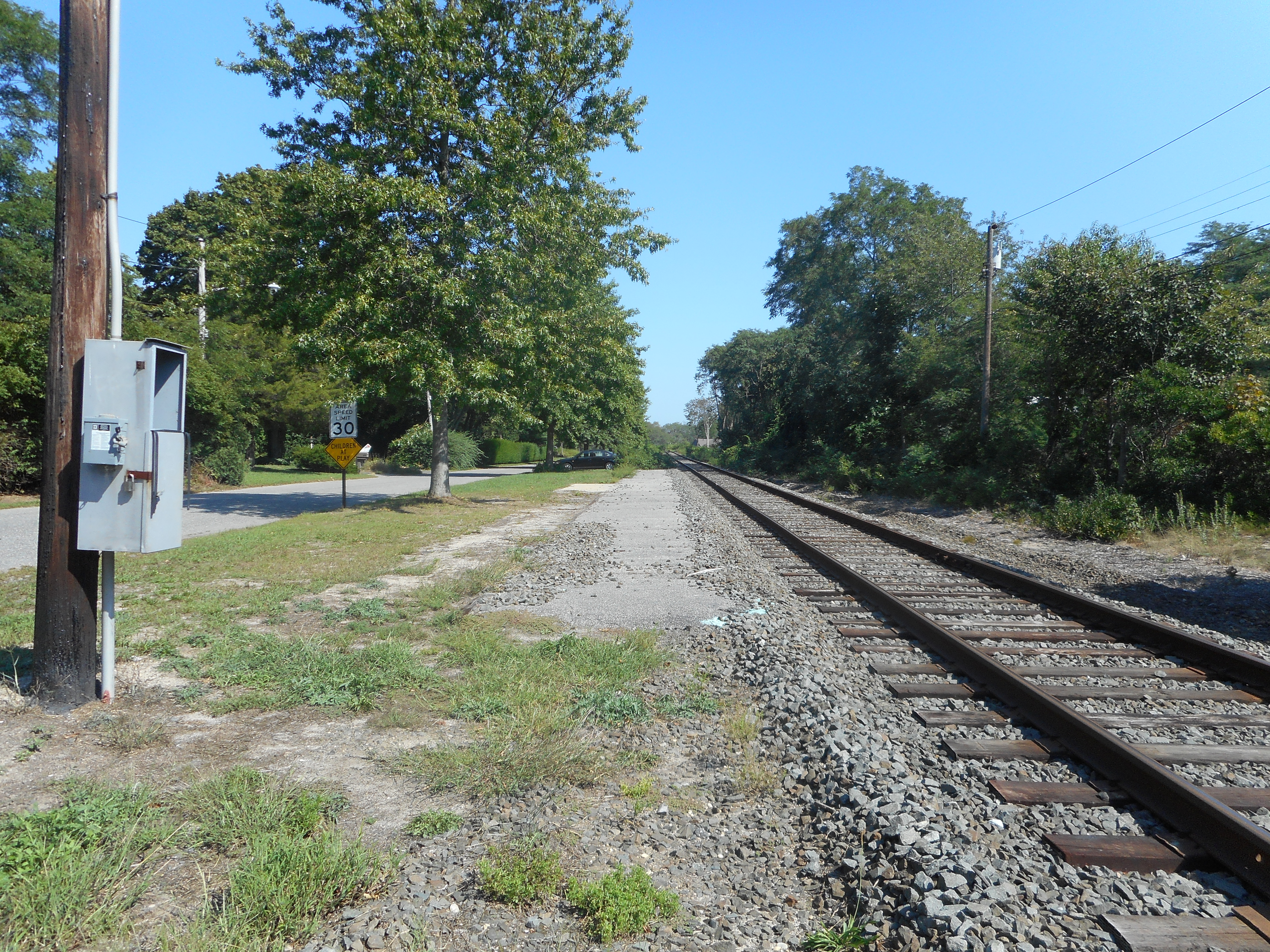
- Platform for the former Jamesport LIRR station on North Railroad Avenue east of Washington Avenue.

General information
- Location: South Railroad Avenue and South Jamesport Avenue (original station)
- Coordinates: 40°56′38″N 72°35′3.3″W
- Line: Main Line
- Platforms: 1
- Tracks: 1

History
- Opened: June 14, 1845;
- Closed: 1958, April 30, 1984
- Rebuilt: August–September 1869, July 18, 1963
- Former names: James' Port

Former services
Preceding station	Long Island Rail Road	Following station
Aquebogue toward Ronkonkoma	Ronkonkoma Branch Greenport Branch	Laurel toward Ronkonkoma
Preceding station	Long Island Rail Road	Following station
Aquebogue toward Long Island City or Penn Station	Main Line	Laurel toward Greenport
Location

Jamesport was a station stop along the Greenport Branch of the Long Island Rail Road in Jamesport, New York. Jamesport's original name was James' Port from the community a mile south of the railroad.

== History ==
=== Early history ===
The first station depot appears on the timetable of June 14, 1845. In August–September 1869 the depot was reconstructed on a site farther to the west, and a platform extending in either direction added. At 3 AM on October 17, 1877, the station building was set on fire by an incendiary and burned to the ground.

It was replaced in July 1878 when the LIRR purchased the saloon building of Charles H. Payne for $200 and converted it to a railroad depot, moving the station now slightly east. The following year, overhangs were added and a standard platform built. A bay window would be installed in the succeeding years.

=== Decline ===
On August 11, 1958, a streamlined revision of century-old practices in eastern Long Island was announced by President Goodfellow included the scheduled for closure in Riverhead town were Calverton and Jamesport.

Jamesport sold no tickets during the year 1957. Since the railroad needed approval from the PSC, a hearing was held on October 3, 1958, in New York City. A few months later on December 11, the PSC authorized the LIRR to discontinue agents at Jamesport and Calverton among other depots, and Jamesport was closed. As of February 11, 1959, the agents were reassigned and the district manager delegated. The Jamesport depot, which was extensively remodeled in 1944, lay abandoned until it was razed on July 18, 1963. A shelter shed was constructed in its place, just west of the depot location on North Railroad Avenue near the Washington Avenue grade crossing.

On February 19, 1962, LIRR Road 'n Rail began and a discontinuation of some rail service began. There was a Road 'n Rail stop for Jamesport at Main Street. The Metropolitan Commuter Transportation Authority took over the LIRR in 1966, including the Road 'n Rail buses.

On January 7, 1972, the MTA proposed that a new fare structure be instituted, in which commuters would pay the same fare regardless of where they boarded the train within a zone. While the stations in zone were close together, they had to be as far as possible from stations in adjoining zones to justify the difference. Running north to south, the scheme would serve an additional purpose as some trains would make all stops in a zone and then run express to New York. Jamesport was in zone 13. New streamlined service improved operation but it would eventually lead to the end of service on little-used East End stations such as Calverton and Jamesport.

Road n' Rail service ended on October 15, 1982. Service at Jamesport ended on April 30, 1984, because of limited patronage. An additional factor that contributed to its closure was the electrification of the Main Line from Hicksville to Ronkonkoma. Periodic midday service suspension on the Main Line east of Hicksville to accommodate work on electrification brought few trains to the East End.
