= Southold, New York =

- Town
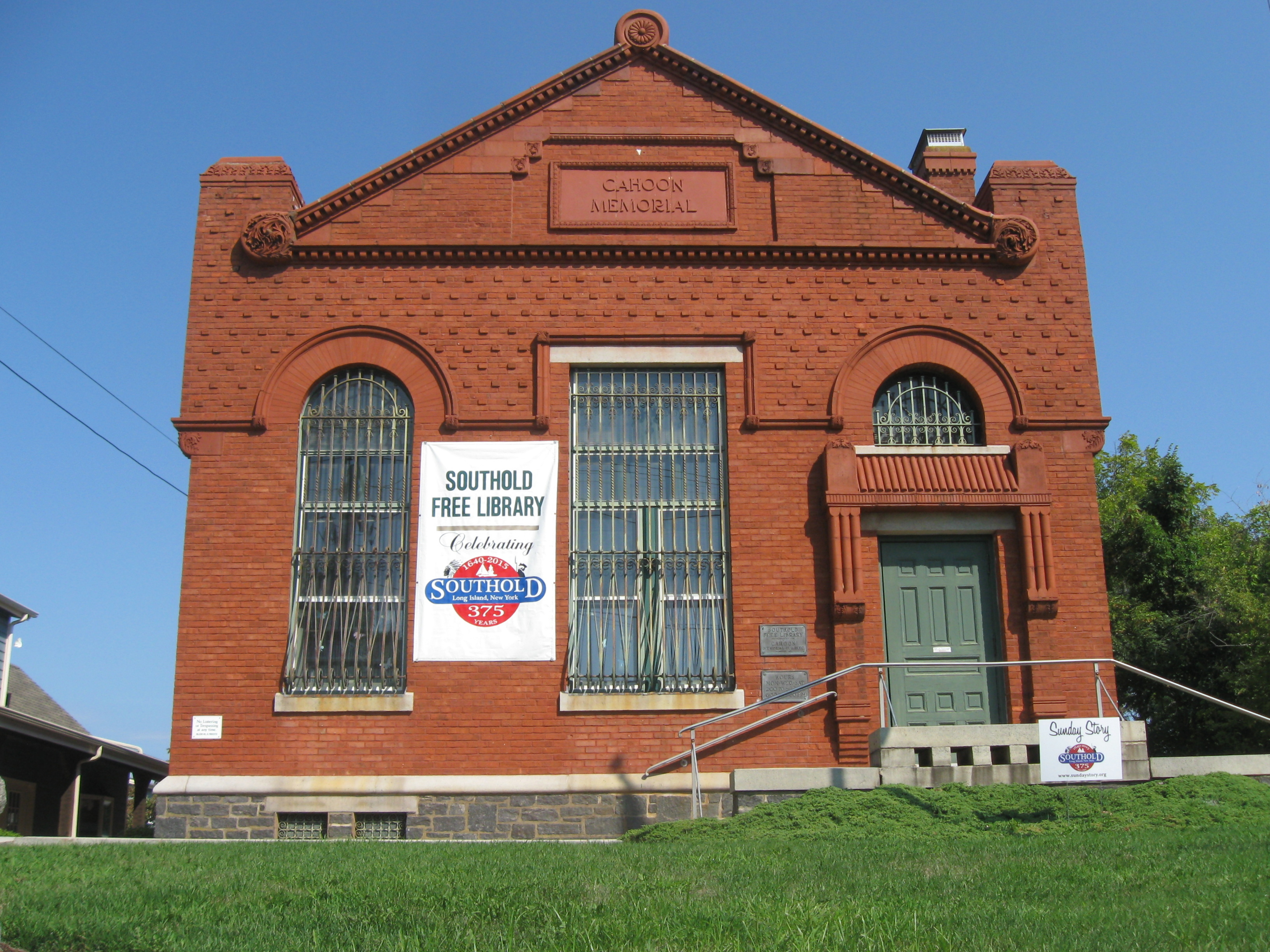
- Southold Free Library

- Seal

- Location in Suffolk County
- Coordinates: 41°4′N 72°26′W
- Country: United States
- State: New York
- County: Suffolk

Government
  - Type: Civil Township
  - Supervisor: Albert J. Krupski Jr. (D)

Area
  - Total: 404.04 sq mi (1,046.46 km^{2})
  - Land: 53.75 sq mi (139.21 km^{2})
  - Water: 350.29 sq mi (907.24 km^{2})
- Elevation: 0 ft (0 m)

Population (2020)
  - Total: 23,732
  - Density: 441.5/sq mi (170.47/km^{2})
- Time zone: UTC-5 (Eastern (EST))
  - Summer (DST): UTC-4 (EDT)
- ZIP Code: 11971
- Area code: 631
- FIPS code: 36-69463
- GNIS feature ID: 0979508
- Website: southoldtownny.gov

The Town of Southold is one of ten towns in Suffolk County, New York, United States. It is located in the northeastern tip of the county, on the North Fork of Long Island. The population was 23,732 at the 2020 census. The town contains a hamlet, also named Southold, which was settled in 1640.

== History ==
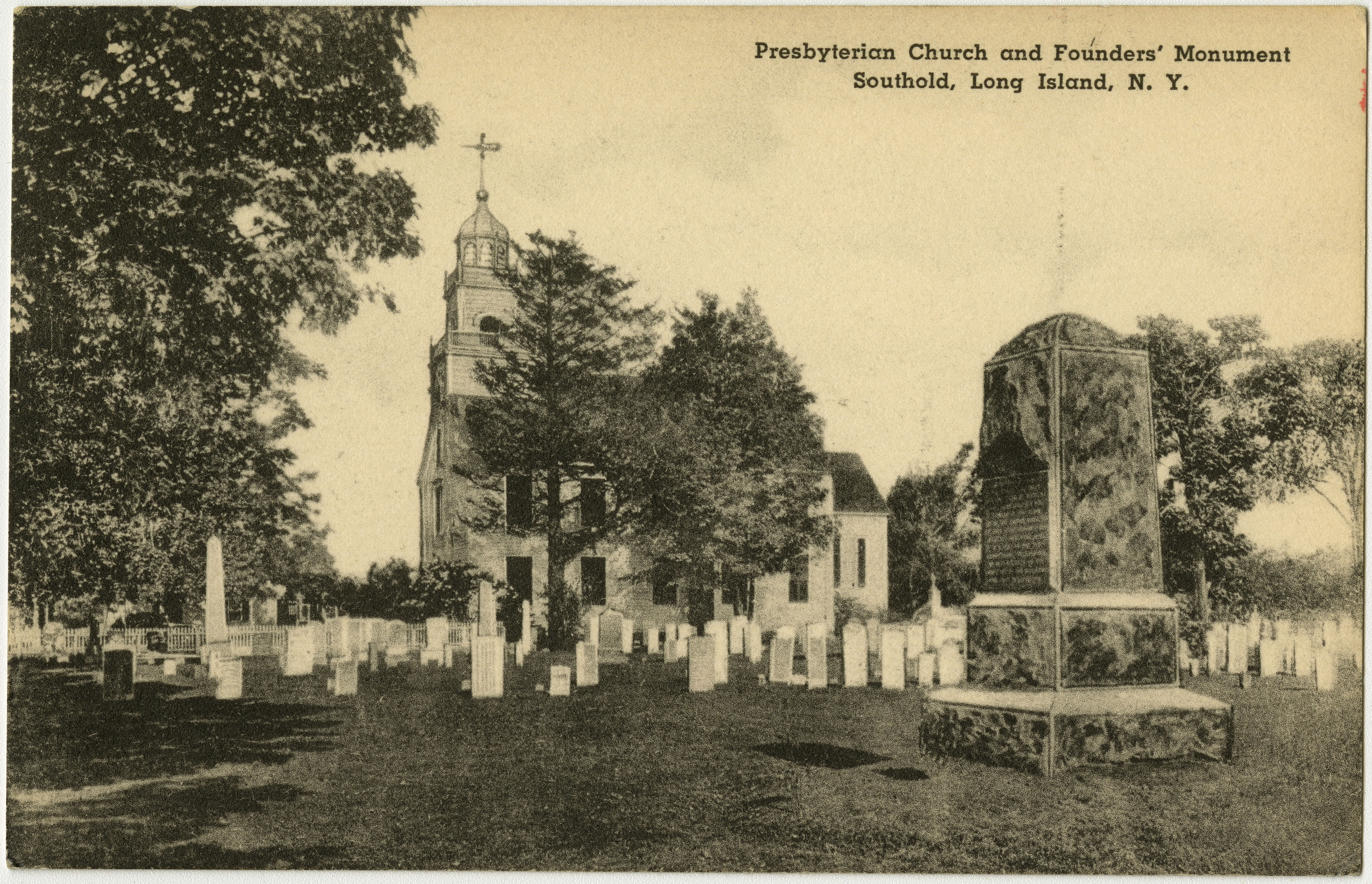
Southold Presbyterian Church and Founders' Monument, Southold, N.Y.

Algonquian-speaking tribes, related to those in New England across Long Island Sound, lived in eastern Long Island before European colonization. The western portion of the island was inhabited by bands of Lenape, whose language was also one of the Algonquian languages.

In surrounding areas, the Dutch colonists had established early settlements to the northwest: on the upper Hudson River was Fort Orange, founded in 1615 (later renamed Albany by the English); and New Amsterdam (later renamed Manhattan) in 1625. Lion Gardiner established a manor on Gardiners Island in East Hampton in 1639. Just across from Long Island, the Connecticut Colony, or Connecticut River Colony, was established in 1636. The Puritans established New Haven Colony separately in 1638, even though it was largely surrounded by Connecticut Colony. New Haven Colony was a theocracy, governed only by church members.

English Puritans from New Haven Colony settled in Southold on October 21, 1640. They had purchased the land in the summer of 1640 from the group of Indians related to the Pequot of New England, who lived in the territory they called Corchaug (now Cutchogue). Settlers spelled the Indian name of what became Southold as Yennicott. In most histories Southold is reported as the first English settlement on Long Island in the future New York State. Under the leadership of the Reverend John Youngs, with Peter Hallock, the settlement consisted of the families of Barnabas Horton, John Budd, John Conklin, John Swazy, William Wells, John Tuthill, and Matthias Corwin.

In 1650, the Treaty of Hartford established a boundary between Dutch and English claims roughly through Oyster Bay on the North Shore. The Dutch colony was the western part of Long Island, and the English dominated the east. The population of Southold at that point was about 180. The harbor at Greenport, on the North Fork, became important in trade, fishing, and whaling, because it rarely froze over. Settlers developed the interior land for agricultural purposes.

Both New Haven Colony and Connecticut Colony had sought to establish Southold as a theocracy. The New Haven Colony did not permit other churches to operate at all, while the Connecticut Colony allowed freedom of religion. New Haven supervised Southold until 1662, when New Haven towns began shifting their allegiance to the surrounding Connecticut Colony. By 1664, New Haven colonists all had decided to join Connecticut, and the New Haven colony ceased to exist. Southold was supervised by the Connecticut Colony until 1674.

When the Dutch took control of the colony of New York in 1673, the English-settled eastern towns, including Southold, East Hampton, and Southampton, refused to submit; the Dutch attempted to force the matter by arms, and the colonists of the towns repelled them, with assistance from Connecticut. When New York was retaken by the English in 1674, these eastern towns preferred to stay part of Connecticut. Although Connecticut agreed, the government of James, Duke of York forced the matter for them to be part of the Province of New York. Governor Sir Edmund Andros threatened to eliminate the residents' rights to land if they did not yield, which they did by 1676. The Duke of York had a grudge against Connecticut. New Haven had hidden three of the judges who sentenced his father King Charles I to death in 1649.

The town called as its second minister Rev. Joshua Hobart, a Harvard graduate from Hingham, Massachusetts, and son of Rev. Peter Hobart. The latter was the founding minister of Old Ship Church, the nation's oldest church in continuous use. Rev. Joshua Hobart was installed in 1674 and served until his death in 1717, when he was 88 years old. Rev. Hobart's brother Josiah was one of the earliest settlers and initial trustees of East Hampton, Long Island, as well as High Sheriff of Suffolk County.

The name Southold is believed to be an elision of Southwold, a coastal town in the corresponding English county of Suffolk. John Youngs, the minister who was one of the founders of the Town, was born and brought up in Southwold, England. Youngs was a member of St. Margaret's Church in nearby Reydon. Within the Town's limits is an area known as Reydon Shores, perhaps a reference to the Reydon, England known by Youngs. The Town's name also may refer to a "holding" to the south [of New Haven]), from whence the original settlers hailed.

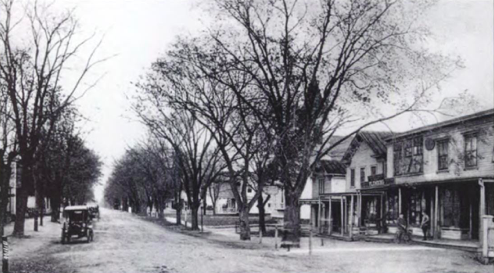
Southold, Main Street, c.1915

In the meantime, the population of Southold grew from 180 in 1650 to 880 by 1698.

In the late 19th century, the Long Island Rail Road extended its line on the North Shore to Greenport. This enabled summer vacationers to travel to the destination by train. Due to the light on the North Fork from water on both sides, the area attracted many artists, including William Merritt Chase.

The area was agricultural, and long dominated by for potato farming. In the late 20th century, large areas of the North Fork were redeveloped as vineyards. This area of Long Island has developed a respectable wine industry. In November 1994, the village of Greenport voted to abolish its police department and contract with the Southold Town Police for law enforcement.

== Geography ==
The town is at the northeastern end of Long Island, New York on a peninsula called the North Fork and its extensions Plum Island, and Fishers Island. The Long Island Sound separates the town from Connecticut. The eastern end of the peninsula, near Orient Point, is north of the Town of Shelter Island, but the town is separated from the South Fork of Long Island by the Great Peconic Bay and the Little Peconic Bay. The western end of the town is the border of the Town of Riverhead. It is twenty-one miles from Orient Point to the border with Riverhead. Robins Island, a protected open space in Great Peconic Bay, is also part of the Town of Southold.

According to the United States Census Bureau, the town has a total area of 404.1 square miles (1,047 km^{2}), of which 53.8 square miles (139 km^{2}) is land and 350.3 square miles (907 km^{2}) (86.69%) is water. The town has approximately 163 linear miles of coastline.

Significant coastal fish and wildlife habitats within the Town of Southold, include: the Mattituck Inlet Wetlands and Beaches, Fishers Island Beaches, Pine Islands and Shallows, the Goldsmith Inlet and Beach, Pipes Cove Creek and Moores Drain, the Dumpling Islands and Flat Hammock.

== Demographics ==
Historical population
Census	Pop.	Note	%±
1790	3,219		—
1800	2,200		−31.7%
1810	2,613		18.8%
1820	2,968		13.6%
1830	2,900		−2.3%
1840	3,907		34.7%
1850	4,723		20.9%
1860	5,833		23.5%
1870	6,715		15.1%
1880	7,267		8.2%
1890	7,705		6.0%
1900	8,301		7.7%
1910	10,577		27.4%
1920	10,147		−4.1%
1930	11,669		15.0%
1940	12,046		3.2%
1950	11,632		−3.4%
1960	13,295		14.3%
1970	16,804		26.4%
1980	19,172		14.1%
1990	19,836		3.5%
2000	20,599		3.8%
2010	21,968		6.6%
2020	23,732		8.0%
U.S. Decennial Census

As of the census of 2000, there were 20,599 people, 8,461 households, and 5,804 families residing in the town. The population density was 383.5 inhabitants per square mile (148.1/km^{2}). There were 13,769 housing units at an average density of 256.3 per square mile (99.0/km^{2}). The racial makeup of the town was 93.53% White, 2.91% Black or African American, 0.07% Native American, 0.45% Asian, 0.07% Pacific Islander, 1.51% from other races, and 1.47% from two or more races. Hispanic or Latino of any race were 4.77% of the population.

There were 8,461 households, out of which 26.5% had children under the age of 18 living with them, 56.8% were married couples living together, 8.5% had a female householder with no husband present, and 31.4% were non-families. 26.6% of all households were made up of individuals, and 15.1% had someone living alone who was 65 years of age or older. The average household size was 2.40 and the average family size was 2.90.

In Southold town the population was spread out, with 21.5% under the age of 18, 5.2% from 18 to 24, 23.8% from 25 to 44, 26.5% from 45 to 64, and 23.1% who were 65 years of age or older. The median age was 45 years. For every 100 females, there were 93.3 males. For every 100 females age 18 and over, there were 90.2 males.

The median income for a household in the town was $49,898, and the median income for a family was $61,108. Males had a median income of $46,334 versus $31,440 for females. The per capita income for the town was $27,619. About 4.1% of families and 5.8% of the population were below the poverty line, including 7.2% of those under age 18 and 5.4% of those age 65 or over.

== Communities and locations ==
=== Villages (incorporated) ===
- Greenport, near the easternmost tip of the mainland.

=== Hamlets (unincorporated) ===
- Cutchogue, in the western part of the town, originally a farming village
- East Marion, in the eastern part of the town
- Fishers Island, a hamlet located on Fishers Island
- Laurel, by the western town line
- Mattituck, in the western part of the town, settled in 1680
- New Suffolk, in the southwest part of the town
- Orient, the eastern tip of the mainland
- Peconic, in the central part of the town, southwest of Southold village
- Southold, the hamlet of Southold, settled in 1640.

=== Other census designated places (CDPs) ===
- Greenport West

=== Other communities ===
- Arshamomaque, between Greenport and Southold village
- Bay Haven, on Little Peconic Bay
- Bay View, on Great Hog Neck
- Beixedon Estates, a private community east of Southold village
- Cedar Beach on Great Hog Neck, southeast of Bay View
- Corey Creek, a private community on Great Hog Neck
- Cove, The
- Cutchogue Station, north of Cutchogue
- Fleet's Neck, South of Cutchogue
- Founder's Landing, the historic center of Southold Village
- East Cutchogue, located east of Cutchogue
- Eastwind Shores
- Laughing Water, near Great Hog Neck
- Nassau Farms
- Nassau Point, on Little Hog Neck
- Oregon, along the vicinity of Oregon Road between Mattituck and Peconic
- Orient Point, at the eastern tip of the mainland
- Reydon Shores, on Great Hog Neck (named after Reydon in Suffolk, England the birthplace of the wife of the Rev. John Youngs).
- Stirling, north of Greenport
- Terry Waters on Little Peconic Bay
- Waterville, north of Mattituck

== Government and politics ==
=== Islands ===
- Fishers Island, in the eastern end of Long Island Sound
- Great Gull Island, (uninhabited) located east of Plum Island and west of Fisher's Island
- Little Gull Island, (uninhabited) located east of Great Gull Island
- Plum Island, a restricted research facility east of Orient Point
- Robins Island, in the Great Peconic Bay

=== Geographic features ===
- Great Hog Neck, a peninsula into Little Peconic Bay
- Little Hog Neck, a peninsula into Peconic Bay
- Long Beach Bay, a bay near Orient
- Orient Harbor, a bay in the eastern part of the town
- Orient Point, the easternmost tip of the mainland of the north fork of Long Island

=== State parks ===
- Hallock State Park Preserve
- Orient Beach State Park, a state park on Orient Point

== Culture ==
Southold Town, along with the rest of the East End, has a cultural history. A handful of artists have lived in the town including; Douglas Moore, Robert Berks, and Walt Whitman. Throughout the town there are art galleries and studios. The town also has a community of musicians.

== Transportation ==
=== Railroads ===
- The Long Island Rail Road's Main Line is the sole line within the Town of Southold. Passengers can go to New York City via Mattituck, Southold and Greenport Stations. The line is also used by the Railroad Museum of Long Island.

=== Bus service ===
- The Town of Southold is served primarily by Suffolk County Transit bus routes, although Hampton Jitney buses are available for trips to New York City.

=== Major roads ===
- New York State Route 25 is the main west–east route in the Town of Southold, and as such is almost entirely named "Main Road." Two truck routes of NY 25 also exist.
- New York State Route 114 enters and exits the Village of Greenport via the ferry to Shelter Island
- County Route 48 (Suffolk County, New York) is a major west–east county road between Mattituck and north of Greenport. The NYSDOT once planned to upgrade the road into part of the Long Island Expressway.
- Sound Avenue was a former segment of New York State Route 25A, which is unmarked, but still serves as an important thoroughfare from Wading River along the north shore into Mattituck.

=== Airports ===
- Mattituck Airport
- Charles Rose Airport

=== Ferries ===
- Cross Sound Ferry Orient to New London, Connecticut
- North Ferry, Greenport to Shelter Island

== See also ==
- National Register of Historic Places listings in Southold (town), New York
- Southold Free Library
