= Cutchogue station =

Former train station in New York, US

Cutchogue
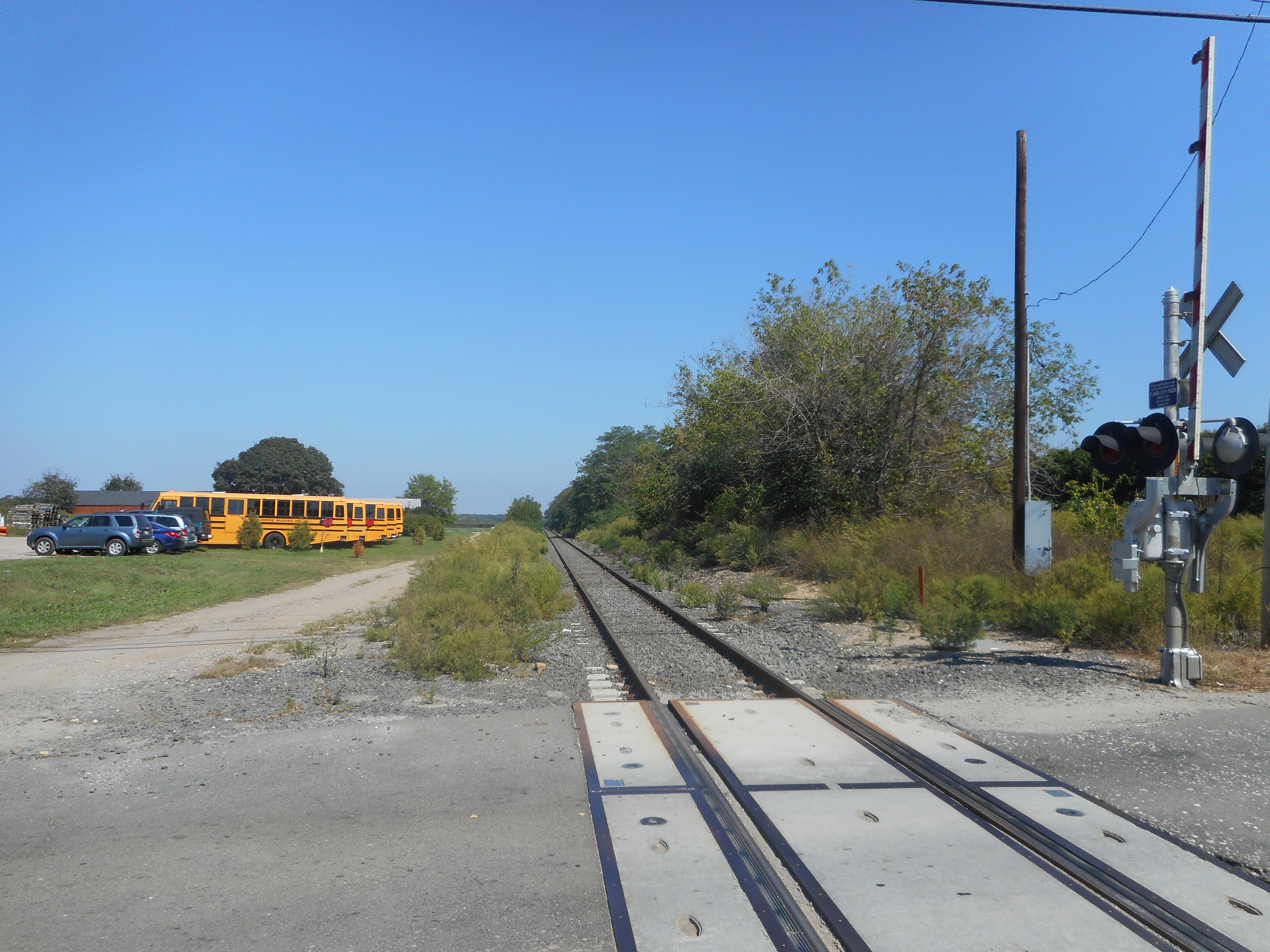
- Site of the former Cutchogue LIRR station

General information
- Location: Depot Lane between Middle Road and Evergreen Drive; Cutchogue, New York
- Coordinates: 41.021667°N 72.49725°W
- Owner: Long Island Rail Road
- Line: Main Line
- Platforms: 2 side platform
- Tracks: 2

Other information
- Station code: None

History
- Opened: July 29, 1844
- Closed: April 30, 1984

Former services
Preceding station	Long Island Rail Road	Following station
Mattituck toward Long Island City or Penn Station	Main Line	Peconic toward Greenport
Location

Cutchogue was a station stop along the Greenport Branch of the Long Island Rail Road. It was located on Depot Lane in Cutchogue, New York, a street that was named for the station.

== History ==
Cutchogue station first appeared on an issued timetable on July 29, 1844, Some sort of structure that was described as new is mentioned in a notice of March 1870. In August 1875 a depot building was put up. A newer and larger station building was erected in 1887. The station building was closed in 1958 and it was discontinued as a station stop around June 1985.
