= Peconic station =

Former train station in New York, US

Peconic
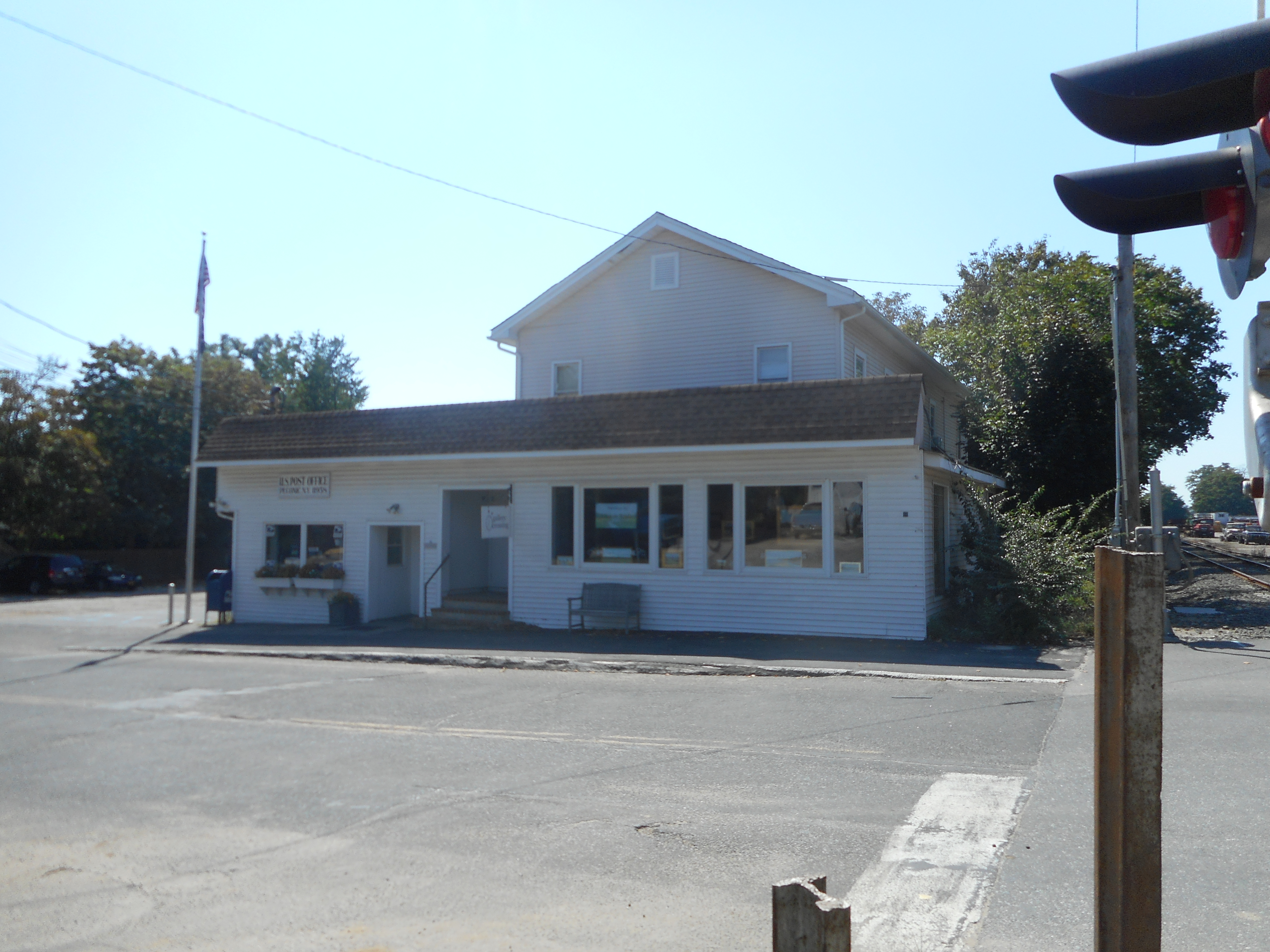
- The Peconic Post Office, which once included the LIRR station

General information
- Location: Peconic Lane near US Post Office; Peconic, New York
- Coordinates: 41.04665°N 72.461519°W
- Owner: Long Island Rail Road (until 1970)
- Line: Main Line
- Platforms: 2 side platform
- Tracks: 2

Other information
- Station code: None

History
- Opened: May 1, 1848
- Closed: 1970

Former services
Preceding station	Long Island Rail Road	Following station
Mattituck toward Ronkonkoma	Ronkonkoma Branch Greenport Branch	Southold toward Ronkonkoma
Preceding station	Long Island Rail Road	Following station
Cutchogue toward Long Island City or Penn Station	Main Line	Southold toward Greenport
Location

Peconic was a station stop along the Greenport Branch of the Long Island Rail Road in Peconic, New York. The station was originally built as Hermitage station on May 1, 1848 (although some sources claim it dates back to 1844) but was renamed Peconic on the June 1876 timetable. In August 1876 a second Peconic Station replaced the former one, which was built on the south side of the tracks and on the west side of Peconic Lane. This building also served as the post office. That station was razed in April 1942 and replaced with a shelter along the platform. The post office moved to the grocery store next door where it remains to this day. When Cutchogue station was closed in June 1962, the two nearest replacements were Mattituck station, which still exists today, and Peconic station, which ceased service in 1970.
