= Horton Point Light =

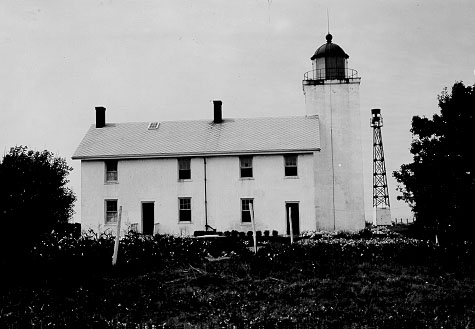
- Location: N end of Lighthouse Rd., Long Island Sound, Southold, New York
- Coordinates: 41°5′6.51″N 72°26′44.77″W

Tower
- Constructed: 1857
- Foundation: granite
- Construction: Granite and brick covered in stucco
- Automated: 1933
- Height: 18 m (59 ft)
- Shape: Square, attached to rectangular house
- Markings: White with black lantern and copper roof
- Heritage: National Register of Historic Places listed place

Light
- First lit: 1857
- Focal height: 103 feet (31 m)
- Lens: Third order Fresnel lens (original), VRB-25 system (current)
- Range: 14 nautical miles (26 km; 16 mi)
- Characteristic: Flashing green, 10s
- Horton Point Lighthouse
- U.S. National Register of Historic Places
- Area: 8 acres (3.2 ha)
- Architect: US Lighthouse Service
- Architectural style: Mid 19th Century Revival
- NRHP reference No.: 94001237
- Added to NRHP: October 21, 1994

Horton Point Light is a lighthouse on the north side of Eastern Long Island, New York in the hamlet of Southold. The lighthouse and the grounds surrounding it are under the supervision of the Town of Southold Park District.

== History ==
The current lighthouse was built and the tower was first lit in 1857. The site is on a bluff 60 feet (18 m) above Long Island Sound. The tower was automated in 1933 and is now operational. The light was deactivated from 1933 to 1990. The foundation is granite and the lighthouse is built out of granite and brick with stucco. A square tower is attached to a rectangular house. The tower is 58 feet (18 m) high with the focal plane of the light being 103 feet (31 m) above sea level. The tower is white with a black lantern and a copper dome. The light has a slow green flash every ten seconds.

=== Chronology ===
- 1790: President George Washington commissioned the lighthouse.
- 1855: Land to build to lighthouse on was purchased by the US government for $550.
- 1857: Lighthouse was constructed and lit with William Sinclair serving as the first light keeper.
- 1933: Light was turned off in the tower and a skeleton tower was lit on shore.
- 1934: In January, Southold Park District purchased lighthouse buildings and grounds from the US Department of Commerce for $1.00.
- 1938: The last keeper stayed until the hurricane of 1938.
- 1976: Restoration of the lighthouse was started.
- 1990: Major restoration allowed for the repair of the tower both internally and externally. The light was reopened and relit. The skeleton tower (seen in photo to right) on the shoreline was removed.
- 1994: Property is listed on the National Register of Historic Places
- 2007: The lighthouse is still an active aid to navigation and hosts a museum. Visitors are able to climb the tower.
