= Southold station =

Long Island Rail Road station in Suffolk County, New York

Southold
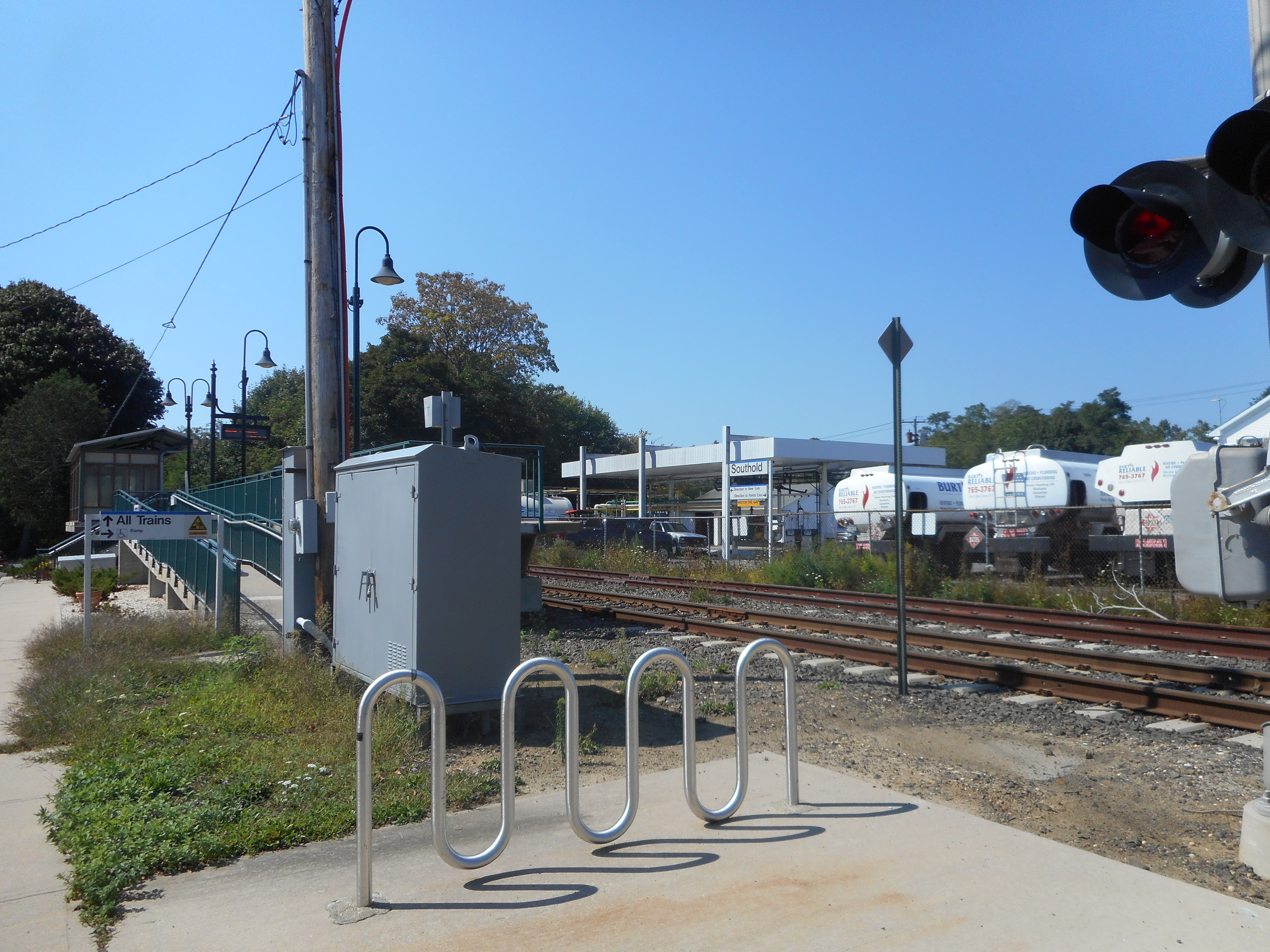
- Southold station as seen from Youngs Avenue

General information
- Location: Youngs Avenue & Traveler Street; Southold, New York
- Coordinates: 41.066295°N 72.427859°W
- Owner: Long Island Rail Road
- Line: Main Line
- Distance: 90.1 mi (145.0 km) from Long Island City
- Platforms: 1 side platform
- Tracks: 2
- Connections: Suffolk County Transit: 92

Construction
- Parking: Yes; Free
- Accessible: yes

Other information
- Station code: SHD
- Fare zone: 14

History
- Opened: July 29, 1844
- Rebuilt: 1869–1870

Passengers
- 2012–2014: 10 per weekday

Services
Preceding station	Long Island Rail Road	Following station
Mattituck toward Ronkonkoma	Ronkonkoma Branch Greenport Branch	Greenport Terminus
Former services
Preceding station	Long Island Rail Road	Following station
Peconic toward Long Island City or Penn Station	Main Line	Greenport Terminus
Location

Southold is a station along the Main Line (Greenport Branch) of the Long Island Rail Road. It is located on Youngs Avenue and Traveler Street, just north of NY 25 (Main Road) in Southold, New York. With only 10 passengers per weekday as of 2014, Southold is the least used full-time station of the Long Island Rail Road.

== History ==
The station opened on July 29, 1844, and then was rebuilt between November 1869 and January 1870. The station was closed again in 1958, and then burned down in June 1962. When Peconic station closed sometime in 1970, Southold station became the nearest replacement. A high-level platform was added during the 1990s.

== Station layout ==
This station has one high-level side platform south of the tracks that is long enough for one and a half cars to receive and discharge passengers.

== See also ==
- List of Long Island Rail Road stations
- History of the Long Island Rail Road
