= Mattituck station =

Long Island Rail Road station in Suffolk County, New York

Mattituck
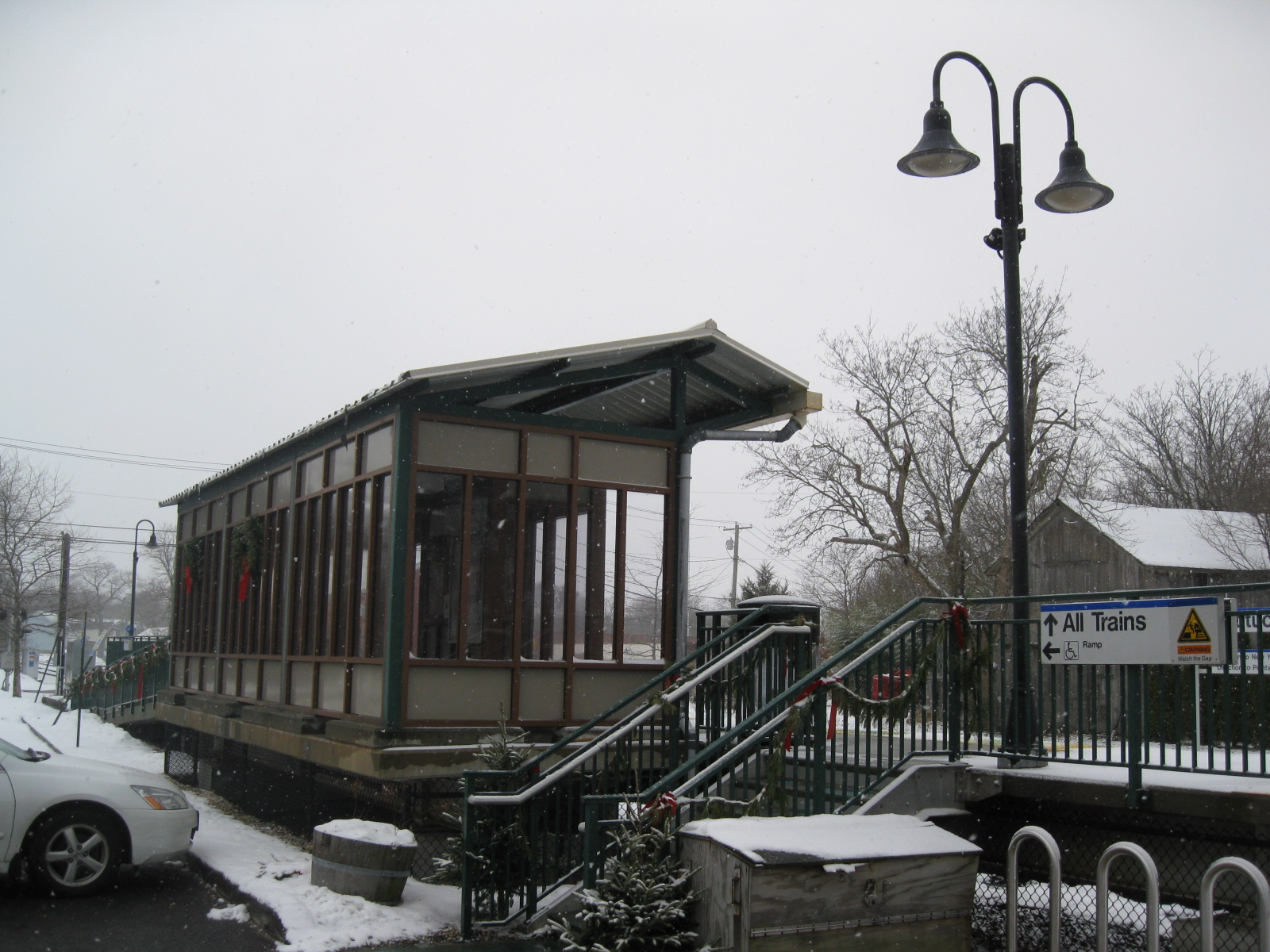
- The station, as seen in January 2010

General information
- Location: Love Lane & Pike Street; Mattituck, New York
- Coordinates: 40.991761°N 72.536009°W
- Owner: Long Island Rail Road
- Line: Main Line
- Distance: 82.4 mi (132.6 km) from Long Island City
- Platforms: 1 side platform
- Tracks: 3
- Connections: Suffolk County Transit: 92

Construction
- Parking: Yes; Free
- Cycle facilities: Yes; Bicycle rack
- Accessible: yes

Other information
- Station code: MAK
- Fare zone: 14

History
- Opened: July 29, 1844
- Rebuilt: 1878, 1958, 2001
- Former names: Mattetuck

Passengers
- 2012—2014: 15 per weekday

Services
| Preceding station | Long Island Rail Road | Following station |
|---|---|---|
| Riverhead toward Ronkonkoma | Ronkonkoma Branch Greenport Branch | Southold toward Greenport |
Former services
| Preceding station | Long Island Rail Road | Following station |
|---|---|---|
| Laurel toward Long Island City or Penn Station | Main Line | Cutchogue toward Greenport |
Location

Mattituck is a station on the Main Line (Greenport Branch) of the Long Island Rail Road in Mattituck, Suffolk County, New York. It is located on Love Lane and Pike Street, north of New York State Route 25.

== History ==
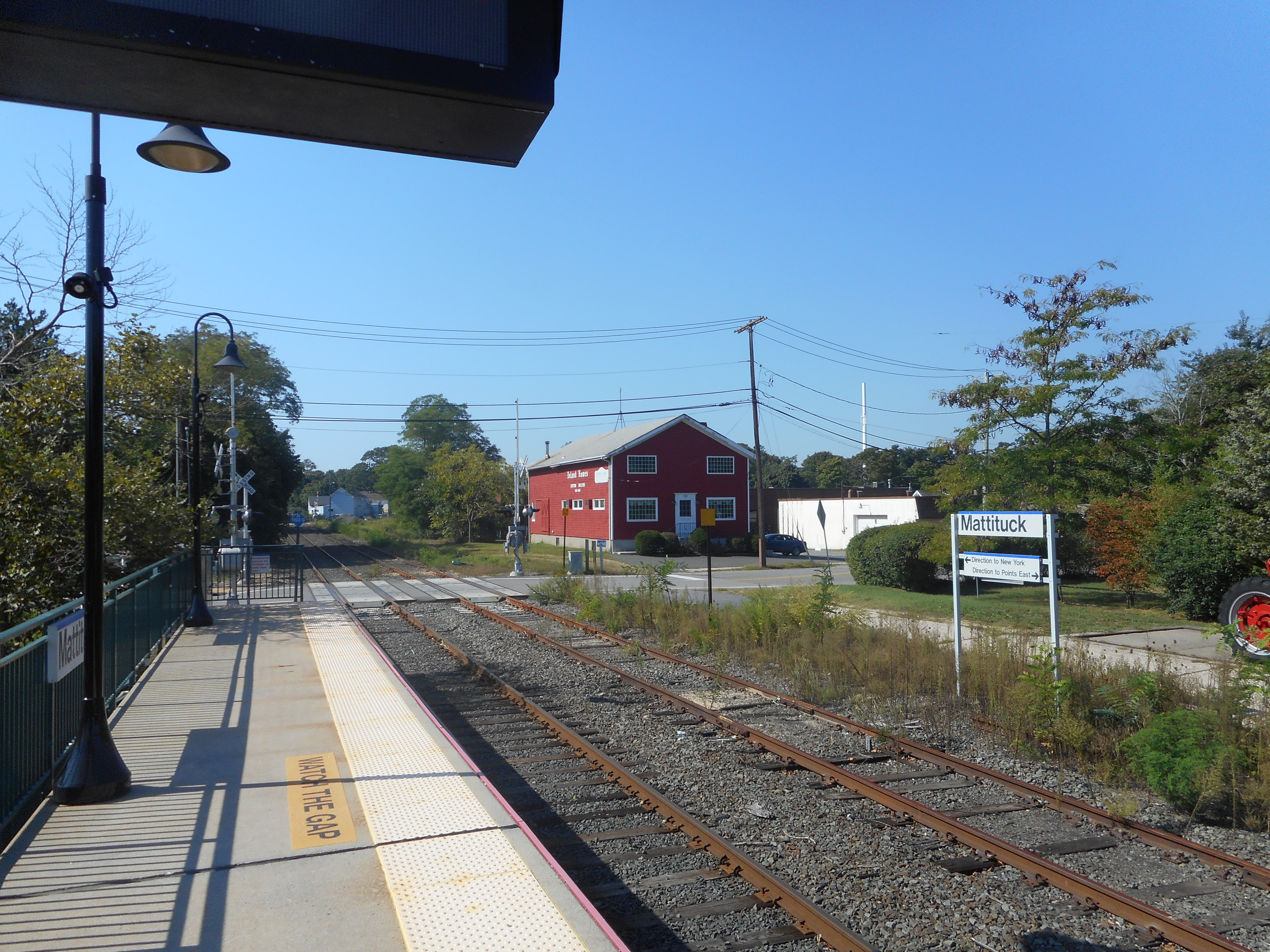
One of the three former "Produce Storage" facilities that served the station

The station was originally named Mattetuck and opened on July 29, 1844. It was rebuilt in 1878 and remodeled in 1944. The station house was closed in 1959 and razed in July 1967, but the station still remained active. When Cutchogue station was closed in June 1962, Mattituck station became one of two replacements, the other being the former Peconic station, which itself closed sometime in 1970. The station contained a total of three "produce storage" facilities, which still exists today, one of which is a real estate office. A new station with high-level platforms was built in the late 1990s.

== Station layout ==
This station has one high-level side platform south of the tracks that is long enough for one and a half cars to receive and discharge passengers. The Main Line has three tracks at this location: one is a siding and one is a freight spur.
