= Greenport West, New York =

- Census-designated place
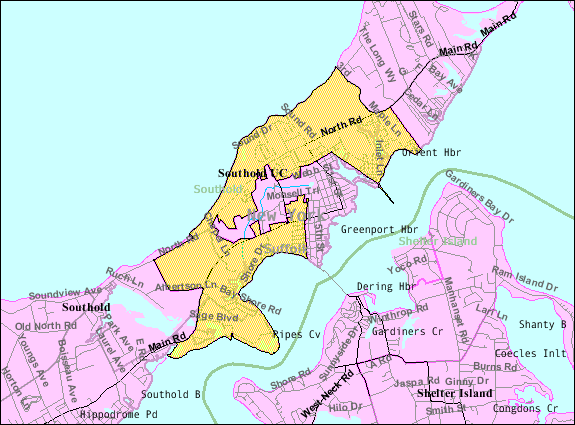

- Location within New York
- Coordinates: 41°6′9″N 72°22′12″W
- Country: United States
- State: New York
- County: Suffolk

Area
  - Total: 6.13 sq mi (15.88 km^{2})
  - Land: 3.21 sq mi (8.32 km^{2})
  - Water: 2.92 sq mi (7.56 km^{2})

Population (2020)
  - Total: 2,282
  - Density: 710.5/sq mi (274.32/km^{2})
- Time zone: UTC-5 (Eastern (EST))
  - Summer (DST): UTC-4 (EDT)
- FIPS code: 36-30581

Greenport West is a census-designated place (CDP) in Suffolk County, New York, United States. As of the 2020 census, Greenport West had a population of 2,282.

Greenport West is in the Town of Southold.

== Geography ==
According to the United States Census Bureau, the CDP has a total area of 3.3 square miles (8.6 km^{2}), of which 3.2 square miles (8.3 km^{2}) is land and 0.12 square miles (0.3 km^{2}), or 3.75%, is water.

== Demographics ==
Historical population
Census	Pop.	Note	%±
2020	2,282		—
U.S. Decennial Census

=== 2020 census ===
As of the 2020 census, Greenport West had a population of 2,282. The median age was 58.0 years. 12.9% of residents were under the age of 18 and 40.4% of residents were 65 years of age or older. For every 100 females there were 82.3 males, and for every 100 females age 18 and over there were 78.5 males age 18 and over.

100.0% of residents lived in urban areas, while 0.0% lived in rural areas.

There were 1,056 households in Greenport West, of which 17.9% had children under the age of 18 living in them. Of all households, 38.4% were married-couple households, 20.9% were households with a male householder and no spouse or partner present, and 35.2% were households with a female householder and no spouse or partner present. About 40.6% of all households were made up of individuals and 27.9% had someone living alone who was 65 years of age or older.

There were 1,658 housing units, of which 36.3% were vacant. The homeowner vacancy rate was 6.7% and the rental vacancy rate was 8.6%.

Racial composition as of the 2020 census
Race	Number	Percent
White	1,772	77.7%
Black or African American	92	4.0%
American Indian and Alaska Native	5	0.2%
Asian	29	1.3%
Native Hawaiian and Other Pacific Islander	0	0.0%
Some other race	184	8.1%
Two or more races	200	8.8%
Hispanic or Latino (of any race)	388	17.0%

=== 2000 census ===
As of the census of 2000, there were 1,679 people, 750 households, and 459 families residing in the CDP. The population density was 505.2 inhabitants per square mile (195.1/km^{2}). There were 1,283 housing units at an average density of 386.1 per square mile (149.1/km^{2}). The racial makeup of the CDP was 90.95% White, 5.72% African American, 0.06% Native American, 0.36% Asian, 1.43% from other races, and 1.49% from two or more races. Hispanic or Latino of any race were 5.96% of the population.

There were 750 households, out of which 20.5% had children under the age of 18 living with them, 49.7% were married couples living together, 9.5% had a female householder with no husband present, and 38.7% were non-families. 31.5% of all households were made up of individuals, and 18.0% had someone living alone who was 65 years of age or older. The average household size was 2.24 and the average family size was 2.82.

In the CDP, the population was spread out, with 19.4% under the age of 18, 4.9% from 18 to 24, 21.9% from 25 to 44, 26.6% from 45 to 64, and 27.2% who were 65 years of age or older. The median age was 48 years. For every 100 females, there were 85.9 males. For every 100 females age 18 and over, there were 85.6 males.

The median income for a household in the CDP was $44,063, and the median income for a family was $56,364. Males had a median income of $47,500 versus $28,375 for females. The per capita income for the CDP was $26,322. About 3.2% of families and 5.7% of the population were below the poverty line, including 6.9% of those under age 18 and 9.6% of those age 65 or over.

== Education ==
Greenport Union Free School District covers the entire census-designated place.
