= Laurel, New York =

- Hamlet and census-designated place
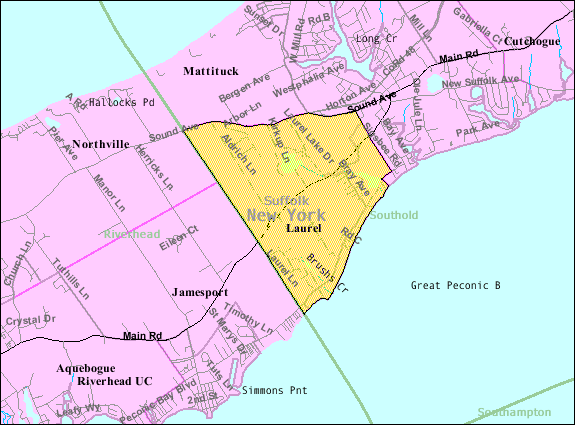

- Location within New York
- Coordinates: 40°58′35″N 72°32′59″W
- Country: United States
- State: New York
- County: Suffolk
- Towns: Southold and Riverhead

Area
  - Total: 3.07 sq mi (7.96 km^{2})
  - Land: 3.00 sq mi (7.77 km^{2})
  - Water: 0.073 sq mi (0.19 km^{2})
- Elevation: 20 ft (6 m)

Population (2020)
  - Total: 1,495
  - Density: 498.3/sq mi (192.41/km^{2})
- Time zone: UTC-5 (Eastern (EST))
  - Summer (DST): UTC-4 (EDT)
- ZIP code: 11948
- Area code: 631
- FIPS code: 36-41465
- GNIS feature ID: 0955082

Laurel is a census-designated place (CDP) roughly corresponding to the hamlet of Laurel in Suffolk County, New York, United States. It is located mostly within the Town of Southold, with a small portion in the Town of Riverhead. As of the 2020 census, Laurel had a population of 1,495.

== History ==
The area was originally known as the "Middle Ground" between Southold and Riverhead. Later it was called Franklinville, but relinquished that name for Laurel due to a conflict of names with another Franklinville.

== Geography ==
According to the United States Census Bureau, the community has a total area of 3.1 square miles (8.0 km^{2}), of which 3.0 square miles (7.8 km^{2}) is land and 0.077 square miles (0.2 km^{2}), or 2.39%, is water.

Historical population
Census	Pop.	Note	%±
2020	1,495		—
U.S. Decennial Census

== Demographics ==
As of the census of 2000, there were 1,188 people, 452 households, and 343 families residing in the CDP. The population density was 354.7 inhabitants per square mile (137.0/km^{2}). There were 686 housing units at an average density of 204.8 per square mile (79.1/km^{2}). The racial makeup of the CDP was 97.05% White, 1.26% African American, 0.25% Native American, 0.08% from other races, and 1.35% from two or more races. Hispanic or Latino of any race were 2.36% of the population.

There were 452 households, out of which 30.5% had children under the age of 18 living with them, 64.4% were married couples living together, 8.4% had a female householder with no husband present, and 24.1% were non-families. 21.2% of all households were made up of individuals, and 13.5% had someone living alone who was 65 years of age or older. The average household size was 2.61 and the average family size was 3.03.

In the community, the population was spread out, with 23.2% under the age of 18, 6.9% from 18 to 24, 25.8% from 25 to 44, 25.0% from 45 to 64, and 19.0% who were 65 years of age or older. The median age was 41 years. For every 100 females, there were 102.4 males. For every 100 females age 18 and over, there were 97.4 males.

The median income for a household in the community was $57,639, and the median income for a family was $67,000. Males had a median income of $48,409 versus $33,750 for females. The per capita income for the CDP was $26,903. About 2.4% of families and 4.0% of the population were below the poverty line, including 3.3% of those under age 18 and 2.3% of those age 65 or over.

== School ==
- Mattituck-Cutchogue Union Free School District
