= Greenport station =

Long Island Rail Road station in Suffolk County, New York

Greenport
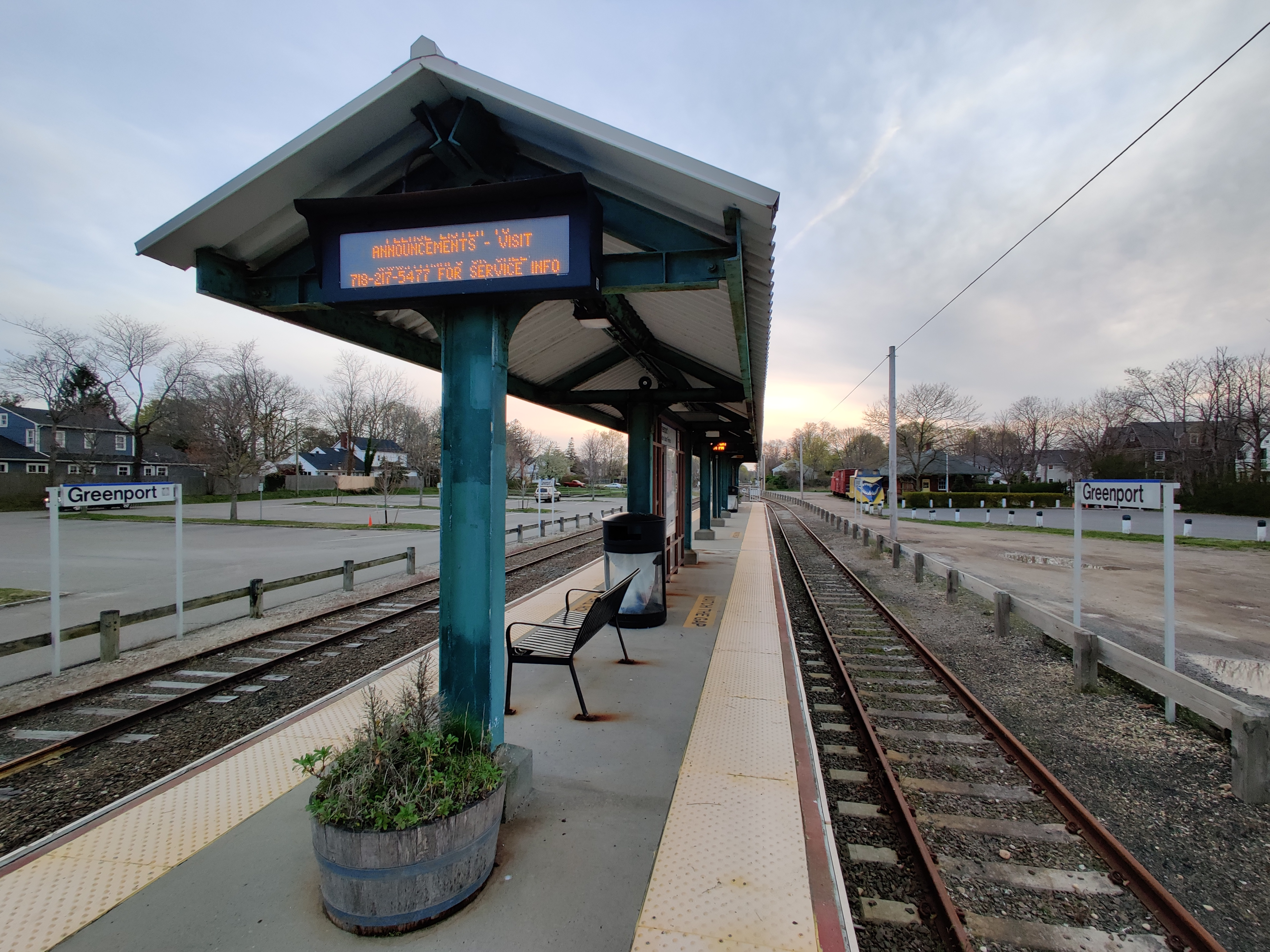
- The Greenport station's platform in 2020, facing west

General information
- Location: Wiggins Street & Fourth Street; Greenport, New York
- Owner: Long Island Rail Road
- Line: Main Line
- Distance: 94.3 mi (151.8 km) from Long Island City
- Platforms: 1 island platform
- Tracks: 3
- Connections: North Ferry; Suffolk County Transit: 92

Construction
- Parking: Yes; Free
- Cycle facilities: Yes
- Accessible: Yes

Other information
- Station code: GPT
- Fare zone: 14

History
- Opened: June 29, 1844
- Rebuilt: 1870, 1892
- Former names: Green–Port

Passengers
- 2012—2014: 21 per weekday

Services
Preceding station	Long Island Rail Road	Following station
Southold toward Ronkonkoma	Ronkonkoma Branch Greenport Branch	Terminus
Former services
Preceding station	Long Island Rail Road	Following station
Southold toward Long Island City or Penn Station	Main Line	Terminus
- Greenport Railroad Station
- U.S. National Register of Historic Places
- U.S. Historic district
- Location: Third and Wiggins St., Greenport, New York
- Coordinates: 41°5′59″N 72°21′49″W
- Area: 4.8 acres (1.9 ha)
- Built: 1892
- Architectural style: Late Victorian
- NRHP reference No.: 89000947
- Added to NRHP: July 20, 1989
Location

Greenport (co-signed as Shelter Island Ferries) is the terminus of the Main Line (Greenport Branch) of the Long Island Rail Road. It is officially located at Wiggins Street and Fourth Street in the Village of Greenport, in Suffolk County, New York – although the property spans as far east as 3rd Street and the Shelter Island North Ferry terminal.

== History ==
Greenport station opened on July 29, 1844, as the terminus of the Main line of the LIRR, although some in the industry had hope of building an extension to a cross-sound bridge. The station was listed as Green–Port on the 1852 timetable. On July 4, 1870, it was burned as part of Town festivities, and was rebuilt in October later that year. Another station was built in its place in 1892 (although some sources claim it was in 1894), with a distinguished ticket office bay window that was removed in the 1920s. A train shed also existed behind the turntable, which was replaced by a coal deposit area. Steam service existed until June 5, 1955, mail was carried at the station until 1965, and the train ran onto a dock until 1978. A ticket booth with a station agent closed at Greenport on October 1, 1967. The station, its freight house, and turntable were placed on the National Register of Historic Places as a national historic district on July 20, 1989. A high-level island platform leading to the old station and the Shelter Island Ferry was built in the late 1990s, as the case was with many other railroad stations on Long Island. The former freight house serves as the east end of the Railroad Museum of Long Island, while the old station is now the East End Seaport Museum.

== Station layout ==
This station has one high-level island platform long enough for one and a half cars to receive and discharge passengers. There is an additional siding south of Track 2.

== Gallery ==
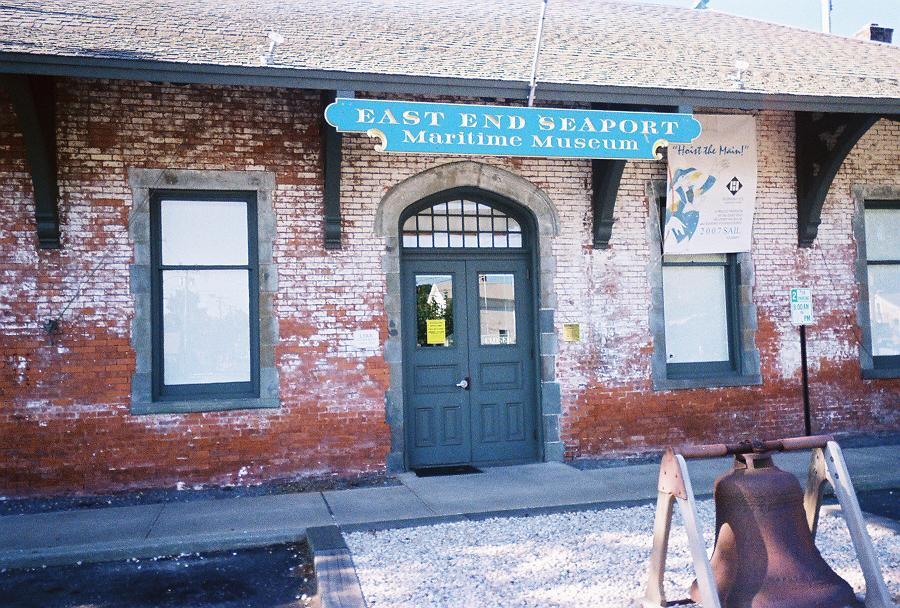
Entrance to old station (now the East End Seaport Museum)

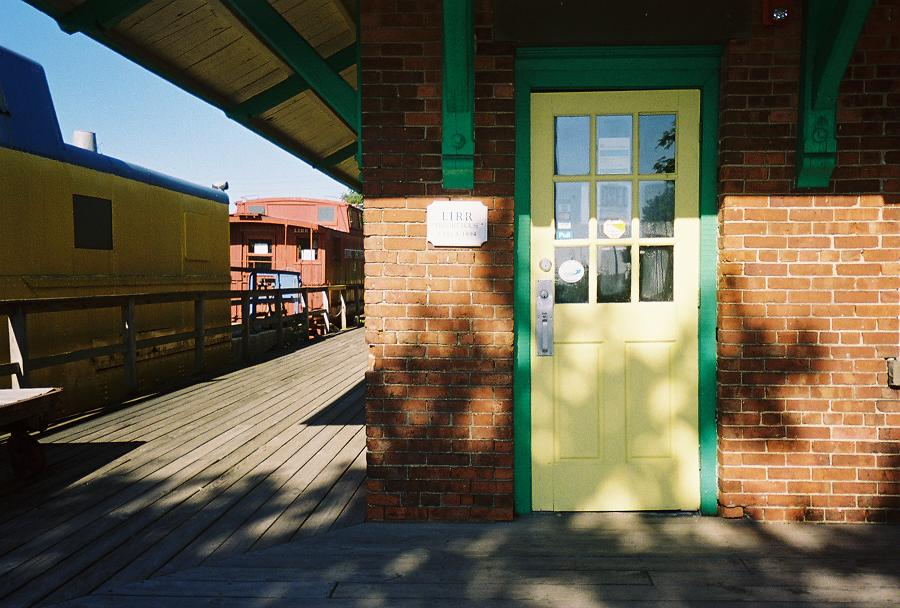
Door to freight house (now the Railroad Museum of Long Island)

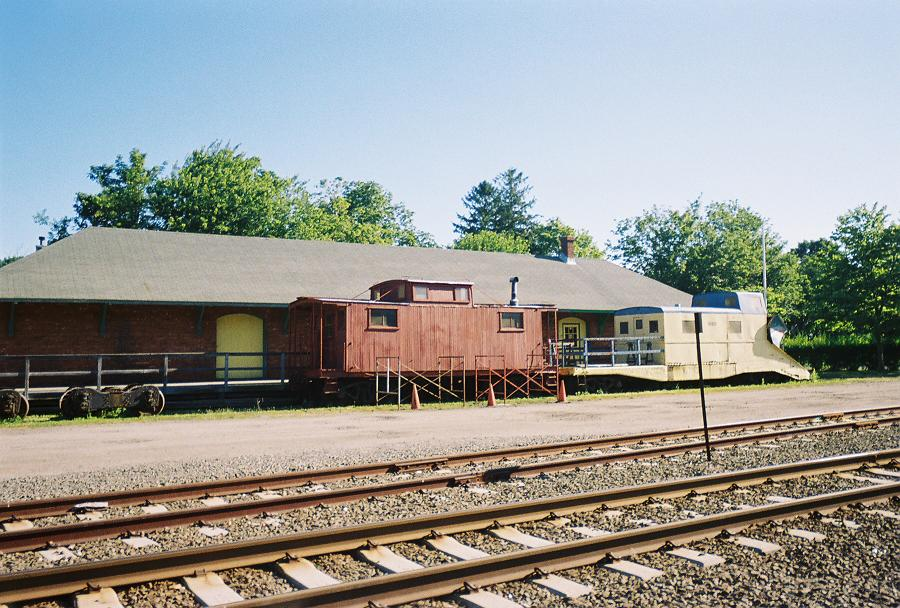
View of freight house from tracks

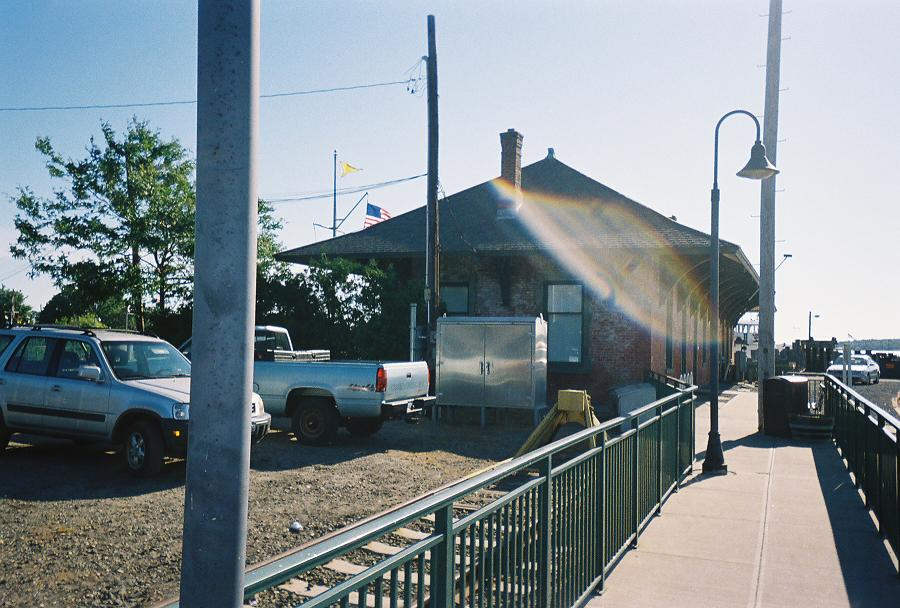
View of old Greenport station from the platform; July 1, 2007

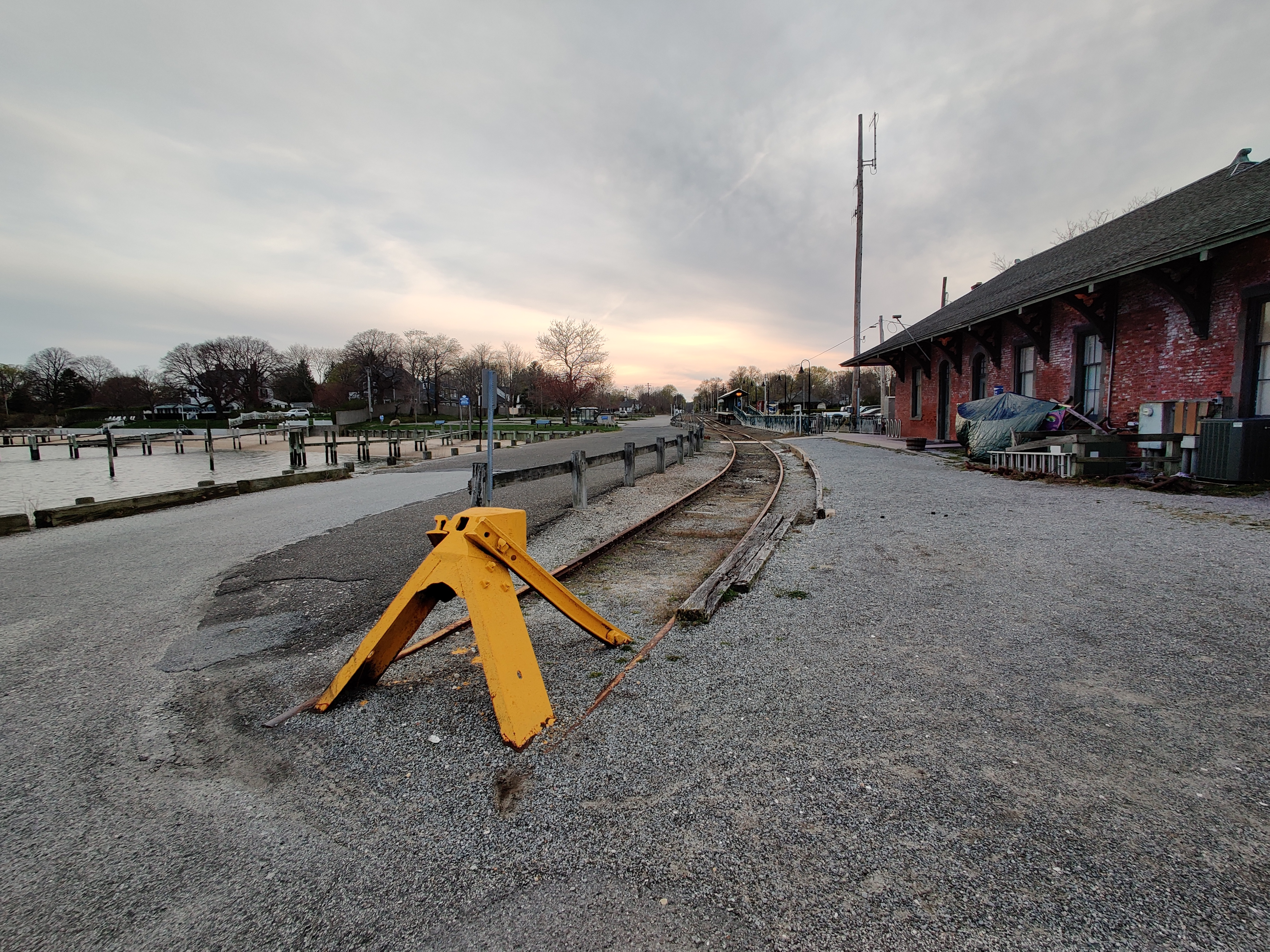
End of the tracks facing west

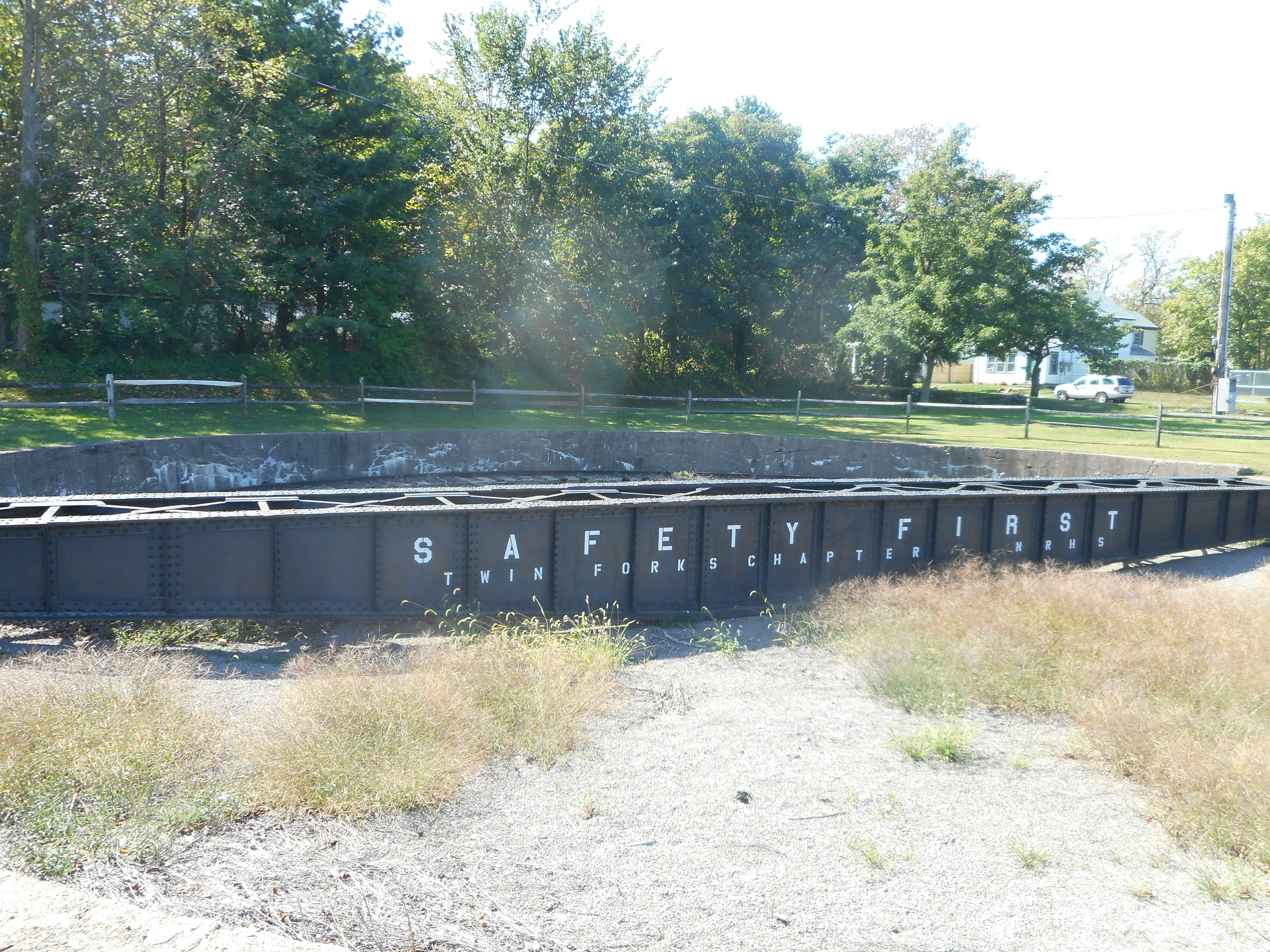
The former turntable, preserved by the RMLI and NRHS.

== See also ==
- List of Long Island Rail Road stations
- History of the Long Island Rail Road
