= National Register of Historic Places listings in Riverhead, New York =

This list is intended to provide a comprehensive listing of entries in the National Register of Historic Places in the Town of Riverhead, New York. The locations of National Register properties for which the latitude and longitude coordinates are included below, may be seen in a Google map.

== Listings ==
	Name on the Register	Image	Date listed	Location	City or town	Description
1	Hallock-Bilunas Farmstead	Hallock-Bilunas Farmstead	April 18, 2003 (#03000251)	733 Herricks Lane; 40°58′42″N 72°35′30″W	Jamesport	
2	Downs House and Farm	Downs House and Farm	May 31, 2016 (#16000308)	5793 Sound Ave. 40°58′46″N 72°36′01″W	Northville	1873 Italianate farmhouse at center of farm with varying agricultural products over the years
3	Jedediah Hawkins House	Jedediah Hawkins House	June 13, 2008 (#08000514)	400 South Jamesport Avenue; 40°56′50″N 72°34′46″W	Jamesport	
4	Hallock Homestead	Hallock Homestead	June 7, 1984 (#84002992)	163 Sound Avenue; 40°59′02″N 72°35′12″W	Northville	
5	Jamesport Meeting House	Jamesport Meeting House	February 20, 2009 (#09000039)	1590 Main Road; 40°57′00″N 72°34′52″W	Jamesport	
6	Riverhead Main Street Historic District	Riverhead Main Street Historic District	August 14, 2012 (#12000512)	Roughly E. & W. Main Sts., Griffing, Roanoke, Maple, & Peconic Aves. 40°55′03″N 72°39′39″W	Riverhead	
7	Second and Ostrander Historic District		August 18, 2017 (#100001491)	Various; 40°55′09″N 72°39′39″W	Riverhead	
8	Suffolk County Historical Society Building	Suffolk County Historical Society Building	July 29, 1994 (#94000786)	300 West Main Street; 40°55′05″N 72°40′05″W	Riverhead	
9	Daniel and Henry P. Tuthill Farm	Daniel and Henry P. Tuthill Farm	August 5, 2015 (#15000518)	1146 Main Road; 40°56′55″N 72°36′02″W	Jamesport	Mid-19th century family potato farm with surviving buildings
10	Tuthill-Lapham House	Tuthill-Lapham House	March 13, 2009 (#09000136)	324 Sound Road, at the corner of Sunset Boulevard; 40°57′53″N 72°51′08″W	Wading River	
11	US Post Office-Riverhead	US Post Office-Riverhead	May 11, 1989 (#88002424)	23 West Second Street; 40°55′06″N 72°39′50″W	Riverhead	part of the US Post Offices in New York State, 1858-1943, Thematic Resource (TR)
12	Vail-Leavitt Music Hall	Vail-Leavitt Music Hall	August 25, 1983 (#83001809)	Peconic Avenue; 40°54′59″N 72°39′45″W	Riverhead	
13	Wading River Radio Station	Wading River Radio Station	May 4, 2018 (#100002389)	408 North Side Road; 40°58′05″N 72°50′26″W	Wading River	Benson House at Camp DeWolfe; used for covert FBI counterintelligence operation against Germany during World War II
14	Benjamin King Woodhull House	Benjamin King Woodhull House	June 13, 2008 (#08000515)	126 Sound Road; 40°57′31″N 72°51′02″W	Wading River	

== See also ==
- National Register of Historic Places listings in New York
- National Register of Historic Places listings in Suffolk County, New York
