= Society of Former Special Agents of the Federal Bureau of Investigation =

Service organization

- Founded: 1937
- Type: Service
- Location: Dumfries, Virginia, U.S.
- Origins: New York City, New York, U.S.
- Region served: Worldwide
- Method: Community service
- Members: 8,500
- Website: socxfbi.org

The Society of Former Special Agents of the Federal Bureau of Investigation (SFSAFBI) is the official worldwide benevolent service organization for former Special Agents of the FBI. In 1972, the Society was called "Mr. Hoover's Loyal Legion" by The Nation.

== Membership ==
The Society has 112 chapters in 50 states. It currently has over 8,500 members, including associate members still active in the FBI. Membership is organized into eight regions: Northeast, Mid-Atlantic, Florida, Southeast, North Central, South Central, Pacific and Western. Each region elects a Regional Vice President as its leader, and a President is installed at the biennial Society conference. The Society’s administrative offices are located in Dumfries, Virginia near the FBI Academy at Quantico, Virginia.

== Activities ==
Many chapters are involved with their local communities and volunteer for causes close to their hearts. One example is Stand Down South Jersey (SDSJ), co-run by two Society members. The organization won the Foundation's Humanitarian Award for its service to homeless veterans in the New Jersey area, as well as the Meritorious Service Medal from the State of New Jersey.

The Society often comments on events to promote or defend the reputation of the FBI and its agents, particularly on subjects related to J. Edgar Hoover, the FBI’s first director. When member Norman T. Ollestad published Inside the FBI, a book that gave an “unflattering” depiction of Hoover, he was expelled from the Society on the basis that his book was “detrimental to the good name or best interests of the society.” When Clint Eastwood and Leonardo DiCaprio were researching their movie J. Edgar on the life of J. Edgar Hoover, they sought help and advice from the agency and from the Society. When it was discovered that the movie intended to depict a scene in which Hoover is seen kissing his Deputy Director and longtime friend Clyde Tolson, the newspaper USA Today noted that the Society of Former Special Agents objected to the controversial and imaginary scene and had "reassessed its tacit approval of the film." In an article discussing the controversy over the movie, the Washington Post cited the anger of the Society of Former Special Agents. Praising J. Edgar Hoover in the newspaper article, the Society President stated: "Devotion is probably a good word for my generation and up."

National media often turn to the Society to provide commentary on current issues affecting the FBI and its agents. For example, when U.S. Senate Republicans criticized the FBI and its interrogators over the questioning of a terrorist bomber, claiming that "Larry King would have a more thorough interrogation", the national political journal Politico turned to a Society spokesperson who stated that "agents find this kind of behavior to be detestable." The Society's Oral History project (see below) is also a continuing source of information for national news media. For example, when famed former Number 3 man at the FBI Cartha DeLoach died, his extensive obituary in the New York Times included quotations from his "2007 oral history interview with the Society of Former Special Agents of the F.B.I."

In 2012, when the FBI was celebrating the 40th anniversary of the first hiring of female Special Agents, the federal agency cited the work of the Society in preserving the story of these pioneering women. The FBI acknowledged the opportunity given by the Society of Former Special Agents for official remembrances of two female Special Agents killed in the line of duty, Robin Ahrens and Martha Martinez.

In accordance with the Society's goal of advocating for issues of importance to its members, the Society has resolved to oppose clemency for Leonard Peltier, who is serving a life sentence for the 1975 murders of FBI agents Ronald Williams and Jack Coler, and to oppose the release of Jose Echavarria, who was sentenced to death for the 1990 murder of FBI agent John Bailey. Those agents were murdered during the performance of their responsibilities while they were on active duty. The Society has vowed to ensure their legacies endure, as well as the legacies of all FBI Special Agents killed in the line of duty.

The official website of the FBI contains many links to articles by and about the Society of Former Special Agents. In a speech at a 2009 meeting of the Society of Former Special Agents, FBI Director Robert Mueller presented television actor Efrem Zimbalist Jr. with an honorary special badge of an FBI Special Agent, praising his role as Inspector Lewis Erskine in the TV series The F.B.I.. Director Mueller noted that in 1985 the Society of Former Special Agents had already awarded Zimbalist a set of retired credentials.

== History ==
In February 1937, during a time when the activities of the FBI had achieved nationwide popularity in the wake of its successful campaign against gangsters such as John Dillinger, Baby Face Nelson, the Ma Barker Gang, and others from the Public enemy era, a group of retired Special Agents met in New York City's Lincoln Hotel to discuss the creation of an organization to preserve the "mutuality of interests of the agents, the memories of pleasures enjoyed and adversities shared." By the end of that year, the SFSAFBI had one hundred and eighteen members. In July 1938, the Society began publication of its Grapevine magazine.

In conjunction with historical entities such as the National Law Enforcement Museum, the Society's History Committee researches, records and preserves historical data regarding both the FBI and the Society itself.

On June 7, 2014, the Society affixed an historical marker to the Benson House, located in Wading River, New York. As a secret base for FBI electronic counterintelligence operations during World War II, the house was instrumental in U.S. efforts to prevent Nazi Germany from developing an atomic bomb and from acquiring accurate details of the D-Day invasion.

== Former Agents of the FBI Foundation ==
In 1957, the SFSAFBI created the "Former Agents of the FBI Foundation", which has distributed millions of dollars in medical and disaster assistance to Society families and the law enforcement community. The mission of the Foundation is to aid members of the Society and their families; help fund educational programs for youth; recognize and award humanitarian efforts of members, spouses and others; and contribute to worthy organizations related to law enforcement. As reported in its 2012 annual report, the Foundation's net assets were $7,462,860.

== Awards and Scholarships ==
=== Awards ===
The Foundation created the "Frances Keogh Memorial Fund" (named after a former Executive Director of the Society) to distribute financial assistance to local, community-based organizations devoted to the care of the sick, the poor, and the homeless. The "William Webster Award" (named after a former director of the FBI) is given annually to an active duty FBI Special Agent for exemplary public or humanitarian service performed outside official employment duties as an agent.

In honor of the first and most famous Director of the FBI, the "J. Edgar Hoover Memorial Scholarship Program" was established in 1978. It annually awards scholarships to criminal justice majors nationwide.

In 1982, the "Louis E. Peters Memorial Award" was created to honor the service of private citizen Louis E. Peters, who gave the last years of his life helping the FBI to obtain evidence against the Bonanno crime family. This award is the highest public service award of the FBI, and it is presented jointly by the FBI and the SFSAFBI.

The Humanitarian Service Award is presented annually to a Society member or member's spouse who goes above and beyond the call of civic duty. The Foundation Board of Trustees select one person annually to receive this award.[4]

=== Scholarships ===
In 2012, the FBI announced a $1 million reward for information leading to the safe recovery and return of Society member Bob Levinson, who disappeared in Iran in 2007 while working as a private investigator. The SFSAFBI, in conjunction with this reward, gave the two youngest Levinson children $5,000 each to help with college costs. Speaking on the Senate floor on March 7, 2012, Florida Senator Bill Nelson praised these scholarship awards to the Levinson children, and thanked the Society members for their service as FBI agents and for the Society's kindness to the Levinson children. Levinson remains a hostage.

== FBI Oral History Heritage Project ==
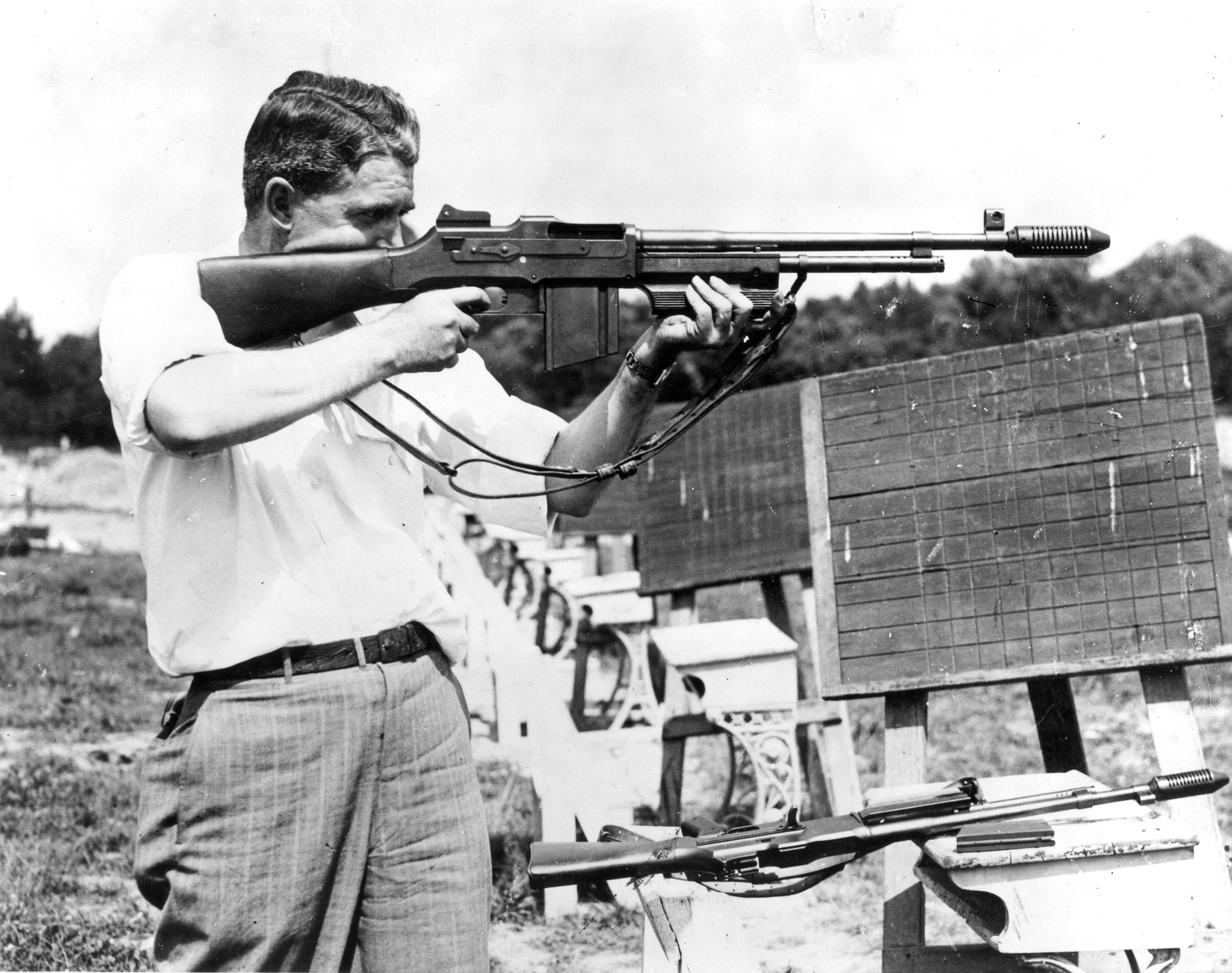
Special Agent at practice range - 1936

The SFSAFBI has been compiling oral histories and interviews of former Special Agents involved in important historical events. These FBI histories are housed at the National Law Enforcement Museum, and can be accessed by the public through the museum's website. The Project currently contains over 550 interviews and memoirs as well as 237 FBI oral histories. The FBI itself often cites this oral history project as a way for the nation to remember the sacrifices of its Special Agents. Additionally, the content of its interviews is often used by national media when discussing famous former FBI agents

Among the more famous former Special Agents included in this oral history are James P. Hosty, the FBI agent who had been assigned to investigate Lee Harvey Oswald upon his return from the Soviet Union, and Cartha DeLoach, another FBI agent involved in the Kennedy assassination investigation who later became Deputy Director of the FBI.

== Notable members ==
- Robert Mueller, former director of FBI
- William H. Webster, former director of both FBI and CIA
- Louis Freeh, former director of FBI
- Frank Keating, former governor of Oklahoma
- Melvin Purvis, (deceased) famous FBI agent who led manhunts for 1930s gangsters John Dillinger, Pretty Boy Floyd and Baby Face Nelson
- Jody Weis, former police superintendent, Chicago
- Mike Rogers, former U.S. Congressman and chairman of the Permanent Select Committee on Intelligence
- Thomas R. Norris, one of three United States Navy SEAL to receive the Medal of Honor for actions during the Vietnam War
- Bob Levinson, Iranian hostage
- Héctor Pesquera, former director, Puerto Rico Department of Public Safety
- Scott Curtis (FBI agent), former special agent known for spearheading record arrest of 127 organized crime members in a single day and TV crime and national security analyst
- Joseph Sullivan famous FBI agent involved in Mississippi civil rights investigations
- Cartha DeLoach, former deputy associate director, FBI, close friend of President Lyndon B. Johnson, and head of FBI team leading the assault on the Ku Klux Klan after the 1964 killings in Mississippi
- W. Mark Felt, 2nd associate director of the FBI identified as the Watergate Scandal's "Deep Throat"
- John S. Pistole, former FBI deputy director and former administrator of the U.S. Transportation Security Administration (TSA)
- Michael G. Oxley, former U.S. Congressman from Ohio
