= Jamesport Nuclear Power Plant =

Proposed nuclear power plant in Suffolk County, New York

Coordinates: 40.991391°N 72.596818°W

The Jamesport Nuclear Power Plant was proposed in 1973 by the Long Island Lighting Company (LILCO) for a site on the northern fork of Long Island near Northville, New York, close to Jamesport. Two pressurized water reactors of about 1150 megawatts were proposed, with projected in-service dates of 1988 and 1990. The project was set aside in the late 1970s, after opposition emerged against LILCO's nearby Shoreham Nuclear Power Plant, which was then under construction. An eventual total of up to four reactors was proposed for the site, as part of LILCO's concept for a "nuclear power park" on the east end of Long Island with as many as 11 reactors in the region.

The 529-acre (214 ha) site was abandoned by LILCO in 1980, and the land was eventually purchased by the Trust for Public Land. 228 acres (92 ha) of the property were sold to the state of New York, becoming Hallock State Park Preserve.
