= Holtsville station =

Former train station in New York, US

Holtsville
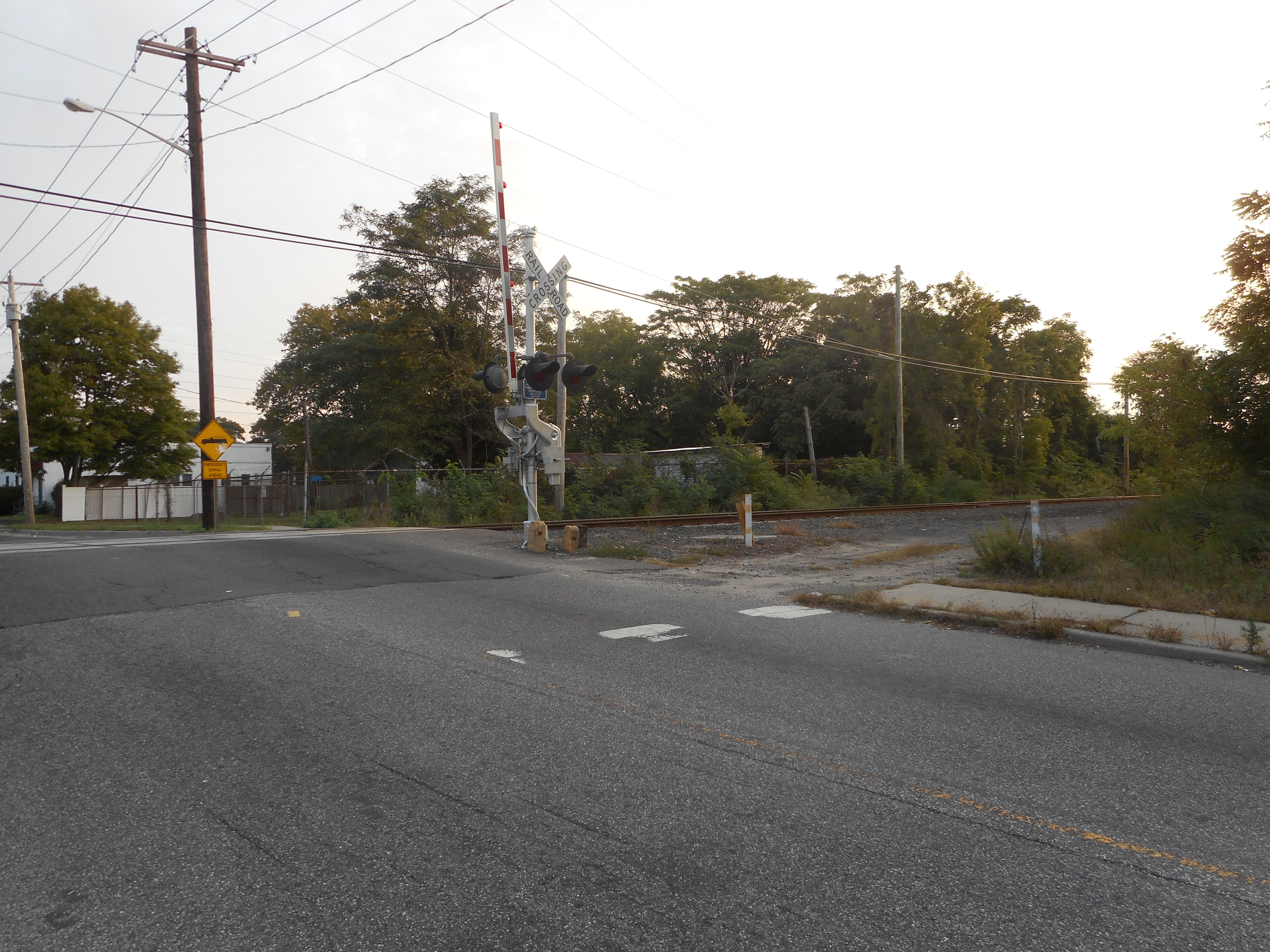
- The entrance to the former Holtsville station from Waverly Avenue.

General information
- Location: Waverly Avenue between Long Island Avenue and Furrows Road; Holtsville, New York
- Coordinates: 40°48′48.4″N 73°2′39.6″W
- Owner: Long Island Rail Road
- Line: Main Line
- Platforms: 1 side platform
- Tracks: 1

Other information
- Station code: None
- Fare zone: 10

History
- Opened: 1843
- Closed: March 16, 1998
- Rebuilt: 1888, 1912, 1914
- Former names: Waverly (1843–1897)

Former services
Preceding station	Long Island Rail Road	Following station
Holbrook toward Ronkonkoma	Ronkonkoma Branch Greenport Branch	Medford toward Ronkonkoma
Preceding station	Long Island Rail Road	Following station
Holbrook toward Long Island City or Penn Station	Main Line	Medford toward Greenport
Location

Holtsville was a station stop on the Greenport Branch of the Long Island Rail Road. It was located off the southeast corner of the Waverly Avenue grade crossing on the south side of the tracks between Long Island Avenue and Furrows Road in Holtsville, New York.

== History ==
The station first opened in a local store as Waverly around 1843. Although the surrounding area was renamed Holtsville in 1860 when a post office opened, the station retained the name "Waverly" until the 1890s, when farmers complained about their shipments going to an upstate town named Waverly by mistake. Holtsville Station was rebuilt on May 13, 1912, only to be burned in another fire on January 4, 1914, and replaced again later the same year. South of the station was the northern terminus of the Suffolk Traction Company's main trolley line, which was proposed to be extended to Port Jefferson, New York, across a bridge over the tracks before the company went bankrupt in 1919. The station building was bulldozed in June 1962, but the station itself continued to operate until March 16, 1998, when it was closed due to low ridership.
