= Jedediah Hawkins House =

Historic house in New York, United States

- U.S. National Register of Historic Places
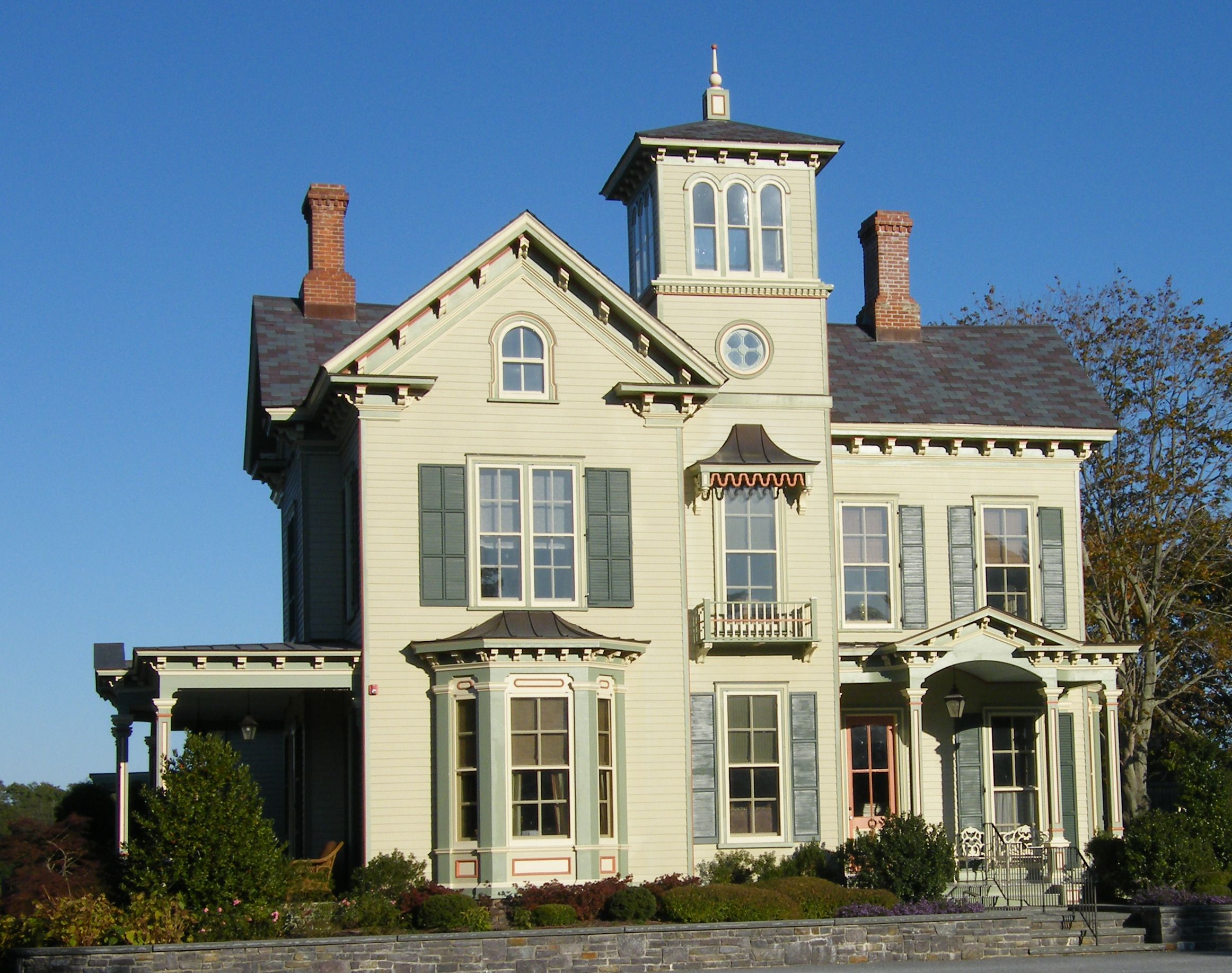
- Jedediah Hawkins House, October 2008

- Location within New York Location within the United States
- Location: 400 S. Jamesport Ave., Jamesport, New York
- Coordinates: 40°56′50″N 72°34′46″W
- Area: 3 acres (1.2 ha)
- Built: 1864
- Architectural style: Italianate
- NRHP reference No.: 08000514
- Added to NRHP: June 13, 2008

The Jedediah Hawkins House is a historic house located at 400 South Jamesport Avenue in Jamesport, Suffolk County, New York.

== Description and history ==
It was built in 1864, and is a frame Italianate style residence. It is a two-story, plus attic, structure with a tall tower (campanile) and a random ashlar, granite foundation. Also on the property is the original 19th-century outhouse, milkhouse, and summer kitchen or washhouse.

It was added to the National Register of Historic Places on June 13, 2008.
