= Long Island Rail Road Demonstration Farm =

Demonstration farms on Long Island (1905-1928)

Coordinates: 40.9561°N 72.8351°W

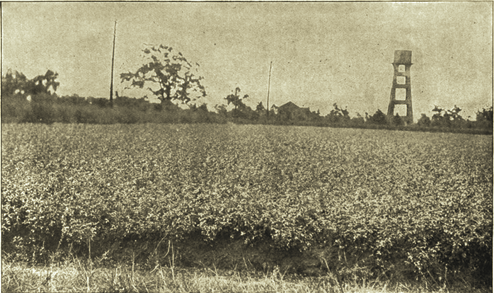
Alfalfa field at Long Island Rail Road Demonstration Farm, Medford (1916)

The Long Island Rail Road Demonstration Farm was an American demonstration farm project on Long Island, New York. It was conducted by the Long Island Rail Road (LIRR) in the early years of the 20th century. Experimental Station No. 1 was built up in the North Shore pine barrens at Wading River by the Wading River station (1905-1928), and Station No. 2, cleared from the middle Long Island scrub-oak wastes at Medford by the Medford station (1907-1927).

== History ==
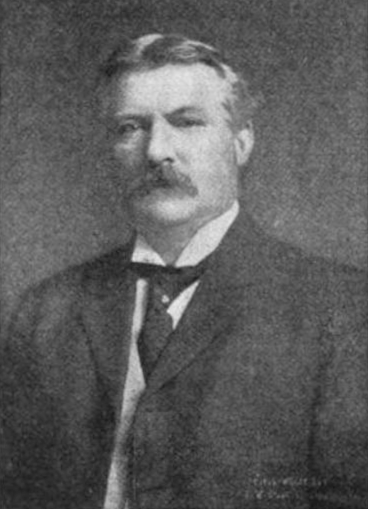
Ralph Peters

The hundreds of thousands of acres of "Scrub oak wastes" and "pine barrens" located on Long Island were available for fertile small home garden plots. What had been missing for many was "know how" and for this reason, Ralph Peters, president of the LIRR decided to develop a demonstration farm where any Long Island farmer could go and absorb all the ideas in sight as well as gain information regarding the ideas underground.

It was the objective of this demonstration farm, to show the growers that they didn't need to go far from New York in order to test crops. The demonstration farm would be used to understand the cause of blights and rots, and endeavored to reduce their health and subsequent financial impact as much as possible. It was also to be used to test the use of insecticides.

These farms were also established to promote freight business for the LIRR.

== Experimental Station No. 1, Wading River ==
In order to demonstrate that the most unprepossessing territory on Long Island could be utilized as a truck farm, or market garden, one of the most desolate, burned-over pieces of land on the North Shore was purchased, after consultation with many old residents and expert growers, who unanimously agreed that the worst piece was a little over a mile west of Wading River station, and contained 18 acres (7.3 ha). Only a few young, half-burned oaks and chestnuts and a few pines showed life. A thick undergrowth of huckleberry and sweet fern covered the soil, which was without leaf-mold or top soil of any description.

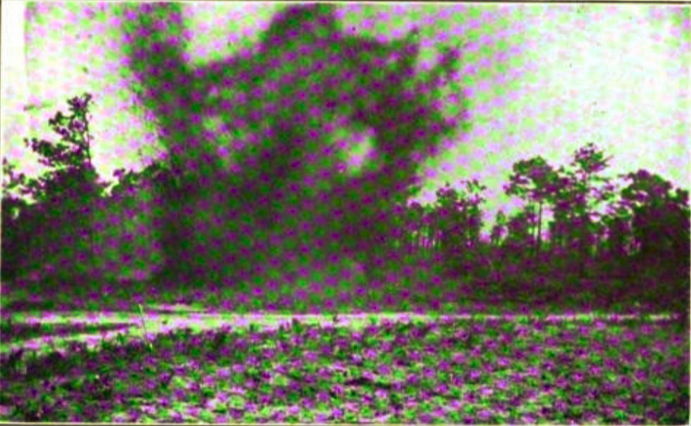
Preparing the ground (1906)

In order to at once clear and put this tract into condition to grow on 10 acres (4.0 ha) a large variety of vegetables, berries and fruits, and on 8 acres (3.2 ha), fodder crops, various methods of clearing utilized on Long Island and elsewhere were carefully considered. As the work was not under headway until September 7, 1905, quick methods were necessary and dynamite was selected as the medium, firstly, because by its use not only the stumps but the roots would be torn out of the ground, secondly, that these stumps would be cleared of all dirt, torn apart and hence could be burned at once, the ashes thus secured being spread to "sweeten" the soil. As fast as the acres were cleared, rye was sown, and in 64 working days, which meant the first half of December, the 10 acres (4.0 ha) were cleared, plowed and harrowed, and rye was drilled upon the entire market garden section.

An orchard was set out, also the usual variety of berries and small fruits, rhubarb, asparagus, horse radish and other crops of this kind. Most of this work was done late in November and December. The orchard trees and bushes were protected by drawing up a mound of earth and covering this with loose strawy manure, leaving a space next to the tree trunk to prevent gnawing by mice and other rodents. This method prevented heaving, and no trees were lost and only one strawberry plant out of the 500 planted.

While dynamite thoroughly loosened up the soil and virtually sweetened and aerated it to a depth of from twenty-four to thirty inches, it left many low places in the ground. The plow and the disc harrow would in the course of time even these up, but knowing it would be rather difficult to sow small seed and cultivate crops growing only eighteen inches apart by means of hand-machines, a clod breaker and scraper was used to level up as far as possible in the very limited time. It was, of course, found that as the winter had been a rather open one the roots of the undergrowth had rotted but little. While these would have been of great value could they have been left to decay, it was necessary to take at least those close to the surface of the land. Of every method tried the only thing that worked satisfactorily was a horse hay rake. About two carloads of these roots were raked off each acre immediately and the ashes spread.

The first seed sown was radish. The dry spring making germination slow demonstrated the value of the 5,000 gallon water tank. The radishes and lettuce matured quickly, yielded with great abundance and were of excellent quality. It was anticipated by nearly all that there would be little or no trouble with insects the first year at least. This supposition, however, was quickly proven erroneous. From the Colorado and striped beetle-which arrived on schedule time or a little ahead-through flea beetles, cabbage worm, root maggot, cauliflower blight, cabbage louse, tomato worms and a large number of other insect pests and all the plant diseases, including one or two very rare ones, the fight was continuous.

Two hundred and eighteen varieties of plant life were raised on the Experimental Station within ten months after clearing was commenced. This number included many varieties of apples, peaches, pears, European plums, apricots, nectarines and quinces, also three varieties of raspberries, one of strawberries, two of blackberries, two of currants, two of gooseberries, three of grapes, two of rhubarb, one of asparagus, one of horse radish, one of artichoke and the flowers that are usually grown about the door-yard of a country home. It included also Virginia horse tooth and White Flint corn, sorghum, millet, teosinte, Canada field peas, cow-peas, and alfalfa, all raised to test the value of the so-called "waste lands" for fodder crops. A full line of the usual vegetable seeds were planted and crops all marketed at good prices, ranking in the open market as "extra choice" and "fancy".

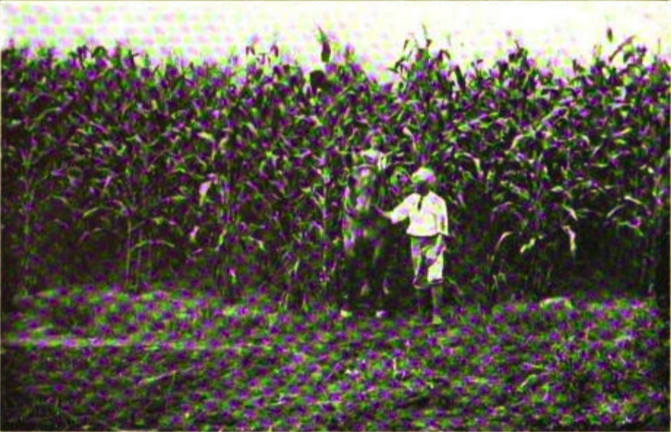
Corn field (1906)

Radishes planted April 14 were shipped May 16, peas planted April 14, were shipped June 10, cabbage set out April 16, first shipment July 10, corn April 17, first shipment July 23, carrots planted April 18, first shipment July 17, tomatoes set out May 18, first shipment made July 25. Potatoes yielded from 260 to 280 bushels to the acre. The yield of the sweet corn, string beans, limas, tomatoes and melons was particularly heavy.

The results attained within one year after clearing land considered valueless proved conclusively that this land was particularly suited to the raising of a very wide range of vegetables without any commercial fertilizer whatever. Multiple crops were raised on many of the plots, radishes, string beans, lettuce and corn all growing without aid of fertilizing material other than that in the ground when the first crop was sown. Irrigation by means of sprinklers helped germination in the early spring and matured such crops as radishes, lettuce, carrots and cabbage most satisfactorily.

The success with the fodder crops was better than that with the vegetables. Alfalfa planted late, on June 1, when it began to bloom had reached a height of 26 inches and cut at the rate of 3,700 pounds to the acre. Alfalfa growers and experts, who visited Experimental Station No. 1, said it was way beyond any other growth of alfalfa in the U.S. both as to size of stalk, stand, color and height.

== Experimental Station No. 2, Medford ==
H. B. Fullerton, director of the LIRR agricultural department, acquired 80 acres (32 ha) at Medford. There, Fullerton successfully cultivated 982 varieties of plant life. His experiments and the results of his work became widely known and the farm was visited by agricultural experts from all parts of the U.S. and from Europe. The farm was sold in 1927.

== Publications ==
The lure of the land; the history of a market-garden and dairy plot developed within eight months upon Long island's idle territory (1909)

The Long Island Agronomist was issued by the LIRR Company as a "fortnightly record of facts" derived from the company's demonstration farms at Wading River and Medford.
