= Benjamin King Woodhull House =

Historic house in New York, United States

- U.S. National Register of Historic Places
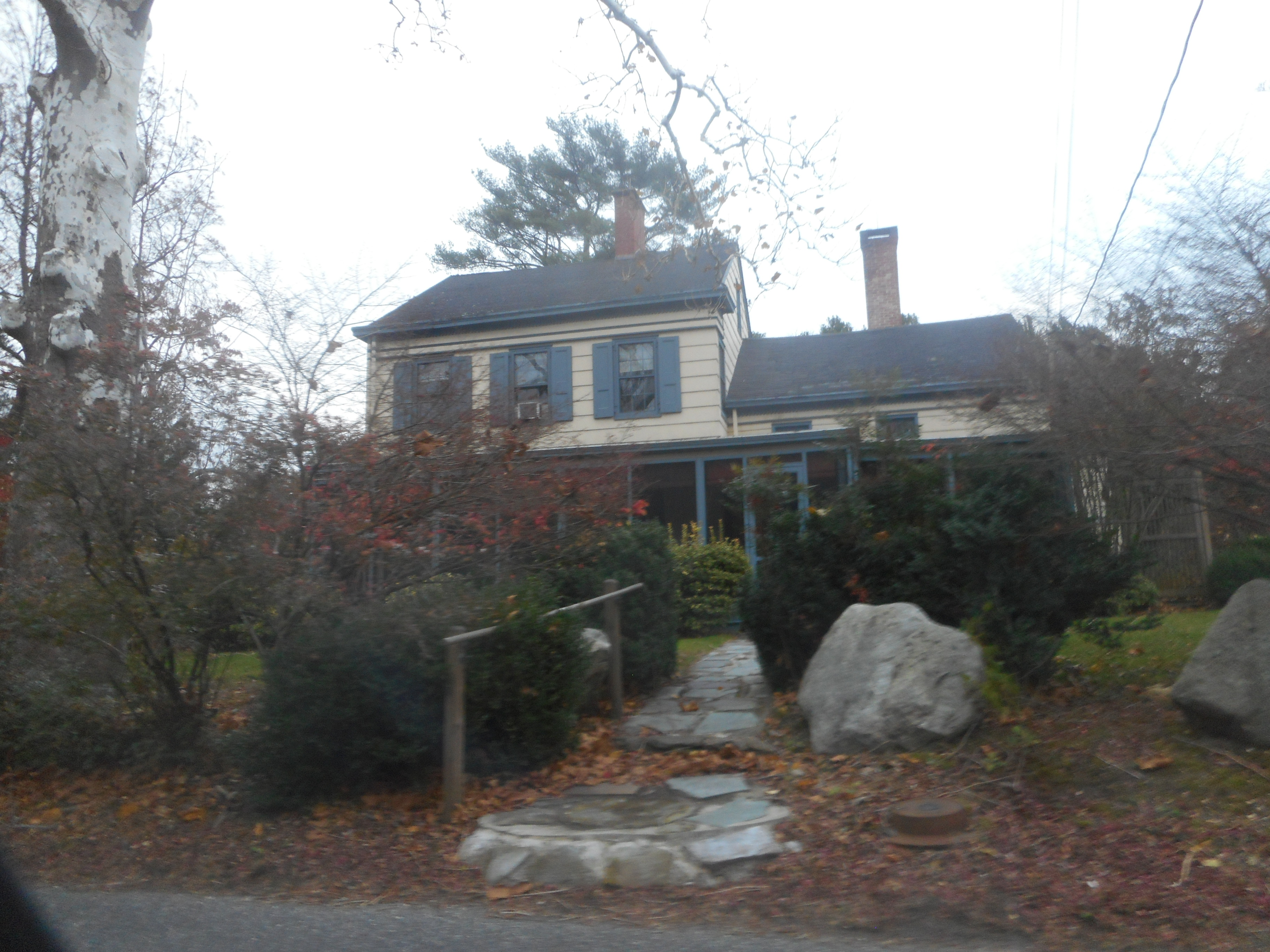
- View of the house in Late-November 2021.

- Location within New York Location within the United States
- Location: 126 Sound Rd., Wading River, New York
- Coordinates: 40°57′30.52″N 72°51′1.5762″W
- Area: 5.7 acres (2.3 ha)
- Built: 1750
- Architectural style: Greek Revival
- NRHP reference No.: 08000515
- Added to NRHP: June 13, 2008

Benjamin King Woodhull House is a historic home located at Wading River in Suffolk County, New York. It was built in 1750, and is two story, side hall type dwelling of wood-frame construction with secondary extensions to the south and east. Also on the property is an outhouse.

It was added to the National Register of Historic Places in 2008.
