= Benson House (Wading River, New York) =

Historic house in New York, United States

- Wading River Radio Station
- U.S. National Register of Historic Places
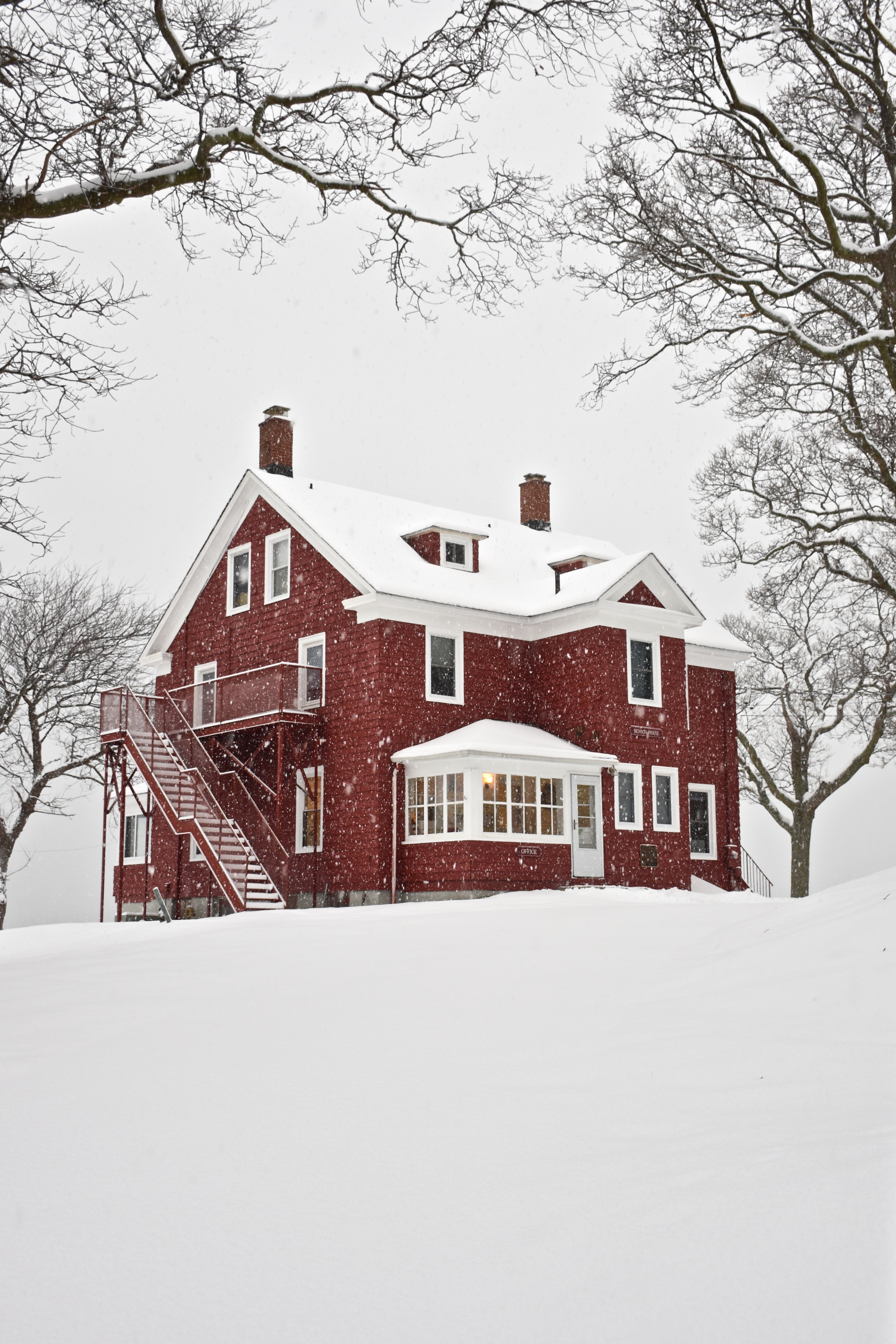
- South elevation and west profile, 2016

- Location within New York Location within the United States
- Location: Wading River, New York
- Coordinates: 40.9680°N 72.8406°W
- Built: 1912
- Architectural style: Colonial Revival
- NRHP reference No.: 100002389
- Added to NRHP: May 4, 2018

The Benson House, listed on the National Register of Historic Places as the Wading River Radio Station, is a three-story, red-shingled wood-frame home in Wading River, New York, situated on the North Shore of Long Island, on a 150-foot-high (46 m) bluff overlooking Long Island Sound. From 1942 until 1945 it housed an important World War II counterintelligence operation, designed to deceive Germany and Japan about Allied war plans.

In 2018 New York's Historic Preservation Board nominated it to the National Register; it was listed later that year.

== History ==
When an Argentinian Nazi spy defected to the American legation in Montevideo, Uruguay, early in World War II, the Federal Bureau of Investigation decided to create a cover operation to convince the Nazis that he and other spies were still working for Germany. The FBI took over Benson House and moved a special agent, Donworth Johnson, and his family into the house, with a cover story that Johnson suffered from tuberculosis and so needed quiet and fresh air. The illness would also explain his military deferment. Johnson's wife, Betty Ann, cooked meals for her husband and other agents who moved in and out under cover of night. They worked on the second and third stories of the house.

The main mission of the operation was to broadcast coded radio transmissions to the Germans in Hamburg, supposedly from the Nazi spies. These transmissions contained a mixture of true and false information. In 1943, counterintelligence designed to keep German troops in northwest Europe and away from the eastern and Italian fronts was transmitted. In 1944, information designed to confuse the Germans about D-Day plans was transmitted. False information about Allied plans to invade Formosa and the Kuril Islands in the Pacific was also sent, to be passed on to Japanese forces.

Transmissions were also received. Intelligence about German interest in developing an atomic bomb, received in 1942, played a role in President Franklin Roosevelt's decision to develop an American bomb.

In order to carry out the operation, several large shortwave radios were installed in the house. In order not to attract attention due to the large amount of electricity needed to run the radios and associated equipment, a Buick car engine was bolted to the floor of the basement to supply power. A muffler helped deaden the noise. Large antennas were required to be placed outside, but were hidden by trees, helped by the then isolated location of the house.

== Current use ==
Until recently, very little has been written or publicly known about the building or the operation carried out there. Benson House was named in honor of Mary Benson, who donated funds to the Episcopal Diocese of Long Island to purchase the house after the war. After it was acquired by the Diocese in 1947, the house was renamed and began its new life as a part of the diocesan summer camp and retreat center, Camp DeWolfe. On June 7, 2014 - the day after the 70th anniversary of D-Day - the Society of Former Special Agents of the FBI and the diocese dedicated a plaque affixed to the house, which explains the building's significance.

== See also ==
- National Register of Historic Places listings in Riverhead, New York
