= Hallock State Park Preserve =

State park in New York, United States

- Location within New York
- Type: State park, nature preserve
- Location: Riverhead and Southold; Suffolk County, New York
- Coordinates: 40°58′59″N 72°35′20″W
- Area: 225 acres (0.91 km^{2})
- Created: 2005
- Operator: New York State Office of Parks, Recreation and Historic Preservation
- Visitors: 39,586 (in 2024)
- Open: Year Round
- Website: Hallock State Park Preserve

Hallock State Park Preserve (formerly Jamesport State Park) is a 225-acre (0.91 km^{2}) state park and nature preserve located in the towns of Riverhead and Southold in Suffolk County, New York. The park is situated on Long Island's north shore, with nearly one mile (1.6 km) of beachfront facing Long Island Sound.

== History ==
The property that was to become Hallock State Park Preserve was formerly used for illegal sand mining during the 1960s, and was once intended to host the Jamesport Nuclear Power Plant planned by the Long Island Lighting Company during the 1970s. KeySpan Energy took ownership of the land in 1998.

It was purchased by New York State from KeySpan Energy in 2002 for $16 million; the purchase also included an additional 300 acres (1.2 km^{2}) adjacent to the future park land. Although the park officially opened as Jamesport State Park in 2005, legal access to the undeveloped park was restricted until official trails and a welcome center could be constructed.

A master plan was adopted for the park in 2010, at which time the park's name was changed from Jamesport State Park to Hallock State Park Preserve. The name change was intended to address the fact that the park was not located in nearby Jamesport; instead the park was named after a pond on the property.

Impending development of the park's facilities was announced in 2014 after $3 million in funding was secured in the state's budget. The state funds joined an additional $3.9 million of development money that was received from selling the adjacent 300 acres (1.2 km^{2}) parcel as protected farmland.

== Park description ==
The 225-acre (0.91 km^{2}) park contains woodlands, open areas and a rare coastal perched pond, in addition to a one-mile-long (1.6 km) beach along Long Island Sound. It is intended to serve as a nature preserve in addition to allowing passive recreation such as hiking, fishing, non-motorized boating, and seasonal horse-riding and scuba diving. There is a park office and nature center, trails, and a road that passes farmland leading to an upper parking lot and trails to Hallock Pond and the Sound. The park boasts commanding views of the Long Island Sound.

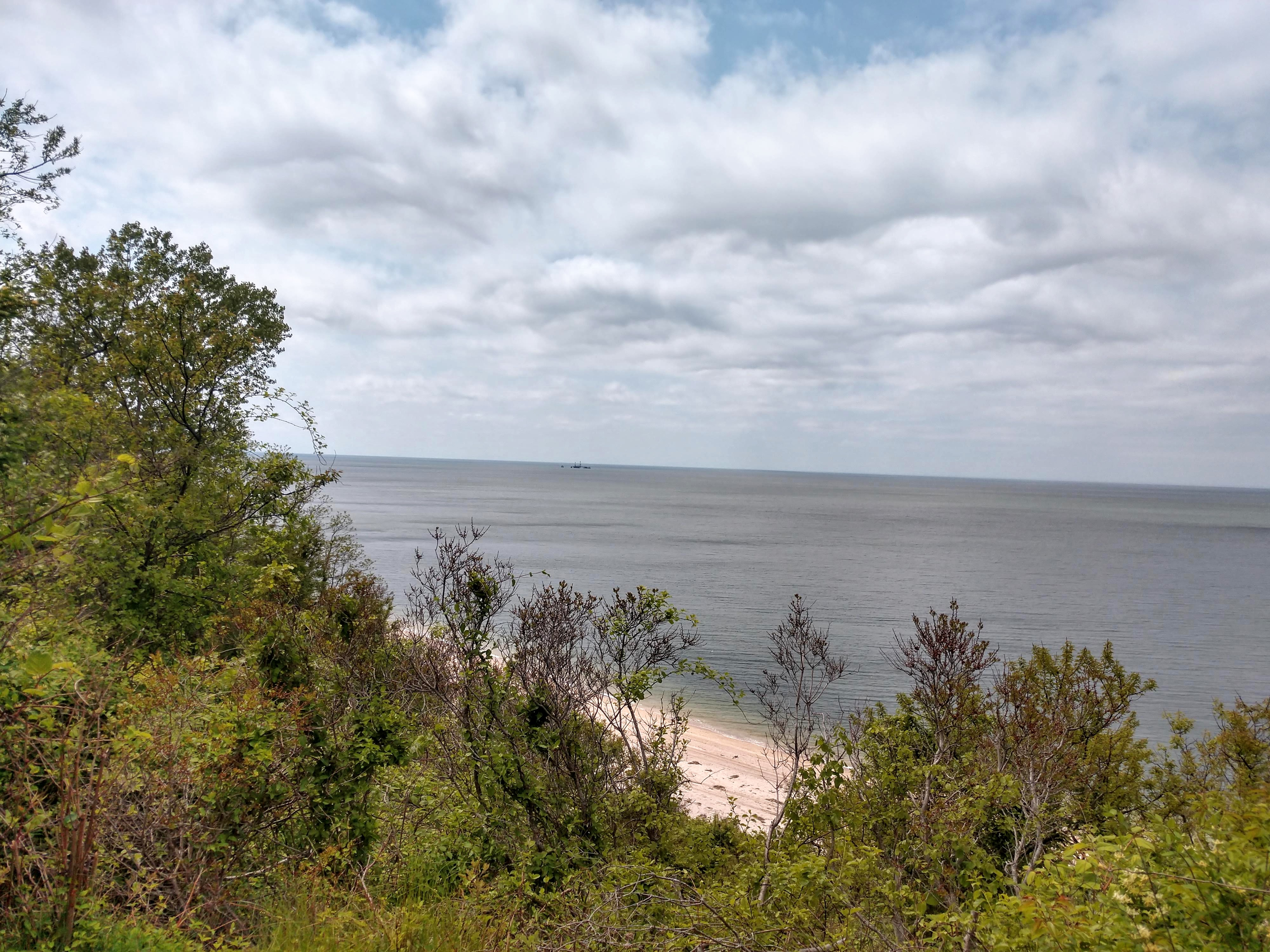
The bluffs and dunes of Hallock State Park Preserve boast commanding views of the Long Island Sound.

== See also ==
- List of New York state parks
