= Pine Valley, Suffolk County, New York =

Pine Valley, New York
- Former Village
- Incorporated Village of Pine Valley
- Location on Long Island Location within the state of New York
- Coordinates: 40°53′45″N 72°39′58″W
- Country: United States
- State: New York
- County: Suffolk
- Town: Southampton
- Incorporated: March 15, 1988
- Dissolved: April 4, 1990
- Founded by: Leonard Sheldon

Area
  - Total: 3.2 sq mi (8.3 km^{2})
- Elevation: 66 ft (20 m)

Population (1990)
  - Total: ~791
- Demonym: Pine Valleyite
- GNIS feature ID: 971974

Pine Valley was a short-lived incorporated village in the Town of Southampton in Suffolk County, on Long Island, in New York, United States. The population was approximately 791 in at the time of the 1990 census.

== History ==
In 1987, residents of what would become Pine Valley voted to incorporate their area in order to gain home rule and authority over local zoning of the community, as they were unhappy with the way their area was being governed by the Town of Southampton; many locals felt that Southampton neglected the area. They also believed that by incorporating, they would have more control over local taxes, which many residents felt were too high when under Southampton's control. This incorporation push was the second successor to an earlier, unsuccessful attempt at incorporating the area as the Incorporated Village of Northampton – an attempt which was unsuccessfully made in 1983 – and another one prior to that attempt.

The Village of Pine Valley was officially incorporated on March 15, 1988. Its founding father was Leonard Sheldon, a residential planner. The movement to incorporate Pine Valley began within a year of the unsuccessful, 1983 attempt to incorporate the area as the Village of Northampton.

Shortly after incorporating, scandals arose over finances and corruption. In addition, taxes increased, and the average family in the village would pay an additional $200 in village taxes on top of the Town of Southampton's taxes – and that despite the increase in taxes, no additional services were created by the village for residents. Furthermore, a series of blunders made by officials prevented the village from creating zoning laws and building moratoriums, and hindered the ability for the new village to mature properly.

By August 1989, several residents of the Village of Pine Valley, which at the time was only 17 months-old, created petitions proposing to either dissolve their village or let go of certain areas, citing the issues plaguing the village.

On April 4, 1990, the village was dissolved – and by 1991, all control of governing of the former village was reverted to the Town of Southampton. The residents voted 165-to-142 in favor of dissolving the village.

== Geography ==
Pine Valley was located in the Long Island Pine Barrens, touching Wildwood Lake. Its northern border was the southern bank of the Peconic River.

The Village of Pine Valley occupied an area of roughly 3.2 square miles (8.3 km^{2}).

The former village is now part of the Northampton CDP and Riverside CDP.

== Demographics ==
Historical population
Census	Pop.	Note	%±
1990	~791		—
U.S. Decennial Census

At the time of the 1990 United States census, the population of Pine Valley was roughly 791.

== Government ==
The Mayor of Pine Valley was Mary Petraszewski. Petraszewski, along with a village trustee and the village attorney, resigned in 1989.

== Education ==
The village was located within the boundaries of (and was thus served by) the Riverhead Central School District and the Riverhead Free Library District.

== See also ==
- Village of the Landing – another former, short-lived village in Suffolk County, located further west in the Town of Smithtown
- Northville, Suffolk County, New York – a former incorporated village in the adjacent town, Riverhead.
