= Ronkonkoma station =

Long Island Rail Road station in Suffolk County, New York

Ronkonkoma
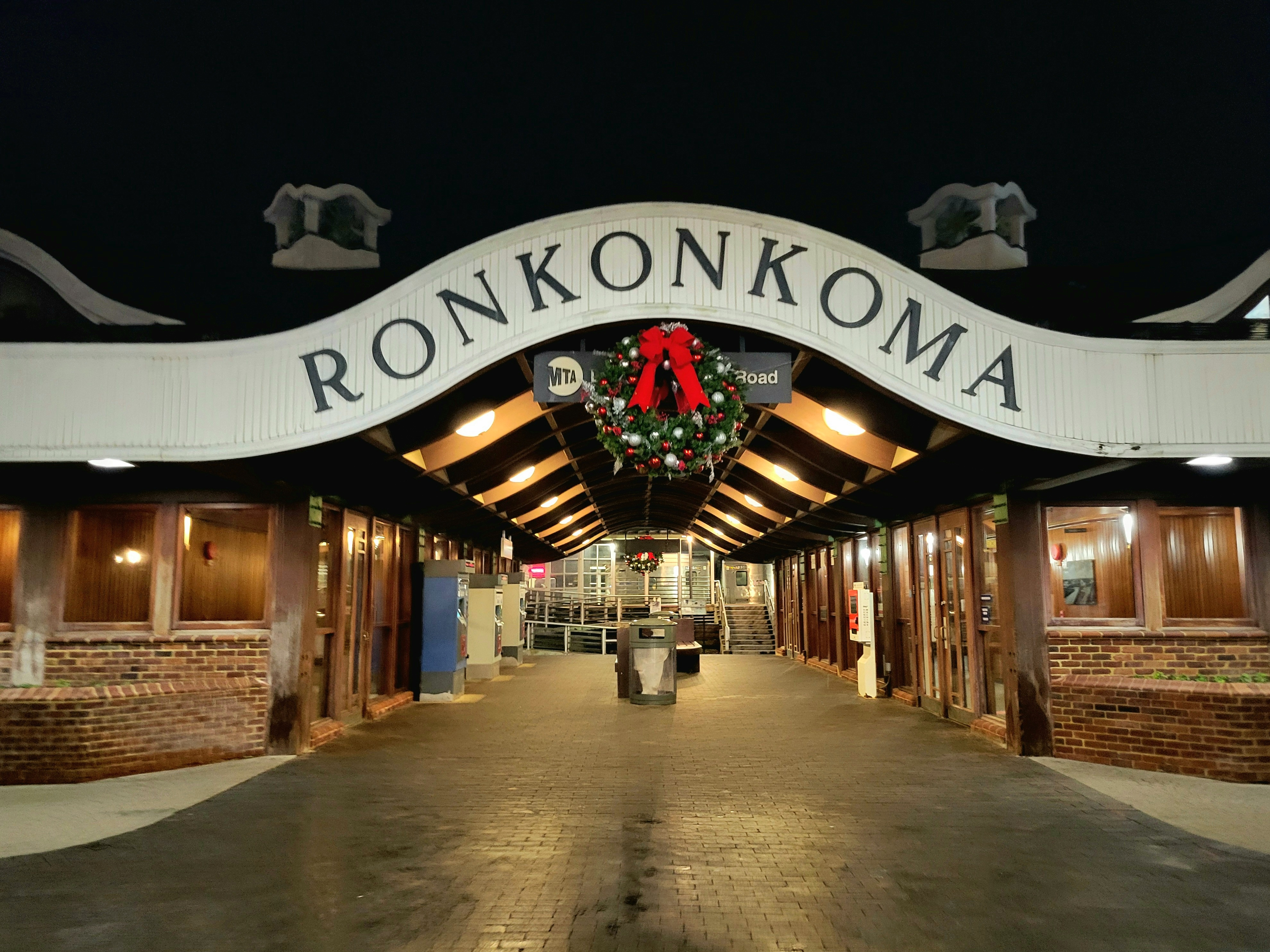
- The Ronkonkoma station in 2023

General information
- Coordinates: 40.808088°N 73.1059°W
- Owner: Long Island Rail Road
- Line: Main Line
- Distance: 48.5 mi (78.1 km) from Long Island City
- Platforms: 2 side platforms 1 island platform Spanish solution
- Tracks: 2
- Connections: Suffolk County Transit: 51, 52A/B, 495 HOV (LI Express); Colonial Transportation to Long Island MacArthur Airport; Greyhound Lines

Construction
- Parking: Yes
- Cycle facilities: Yes
- Accessible: yes
- Architect: Richard Henry Behr

Other information
- Station code: RON
- Fare zone: 10

History
- Opened: 1883
- Rebuilt: 1986–1997
- Electrified: January 18, 1988; 750 V (DC) third rail
- Former names: Lake Ronkonkoma

Passengers
- 2012–14: 15,021 per weekday
- Rank: 5 out of 126

Services
Preceding station	Long Island Rail Road	Following station
Central Islip toward Penn Station or Grand Central	Ronkonkoma Branch Electric service	Terminus
Terminus	Ronkonkoma Branch Greenport Branch	Medford toward Greenport
Former services
Preceding station	Long Island Rail Road	Following station
Central Islip toward Long Island City or Penn Station	Main Line	Holbrook toward Greenport
Future services
Preceding station	Amtrak	Following station
Hicksville toward Norfolk, Newport News or Christiansburg	Northeast Regional	Terminus
Location

Ronkonkoma (signed as Ronkonkoma LI MacArthur Airport) is a major railroad station and transportation hub along the Main Line of the Long Island Rail Road in Ronkonkoma, Suffolk County, New York. The station is the eastern terminus of the Ronkonkoma Branch and the western terminus of the Greenport Branch, and it also serves the adjacent Long Island MacArthur Airport. It will eventually also be served by Amtrak's Northeast Regional.

The station is located on Railroad Avenue North across from the intersection of Hawkins Avenue, and has parking facilities and other amenities that extend beyond the central location. Free parking is available in the lots adjacent to the tracks on the north and south side. One parking garage north of the station was built in 1996 on a former freight spur. The station has a total of approximately 5,452 parking spaces.

== History ==
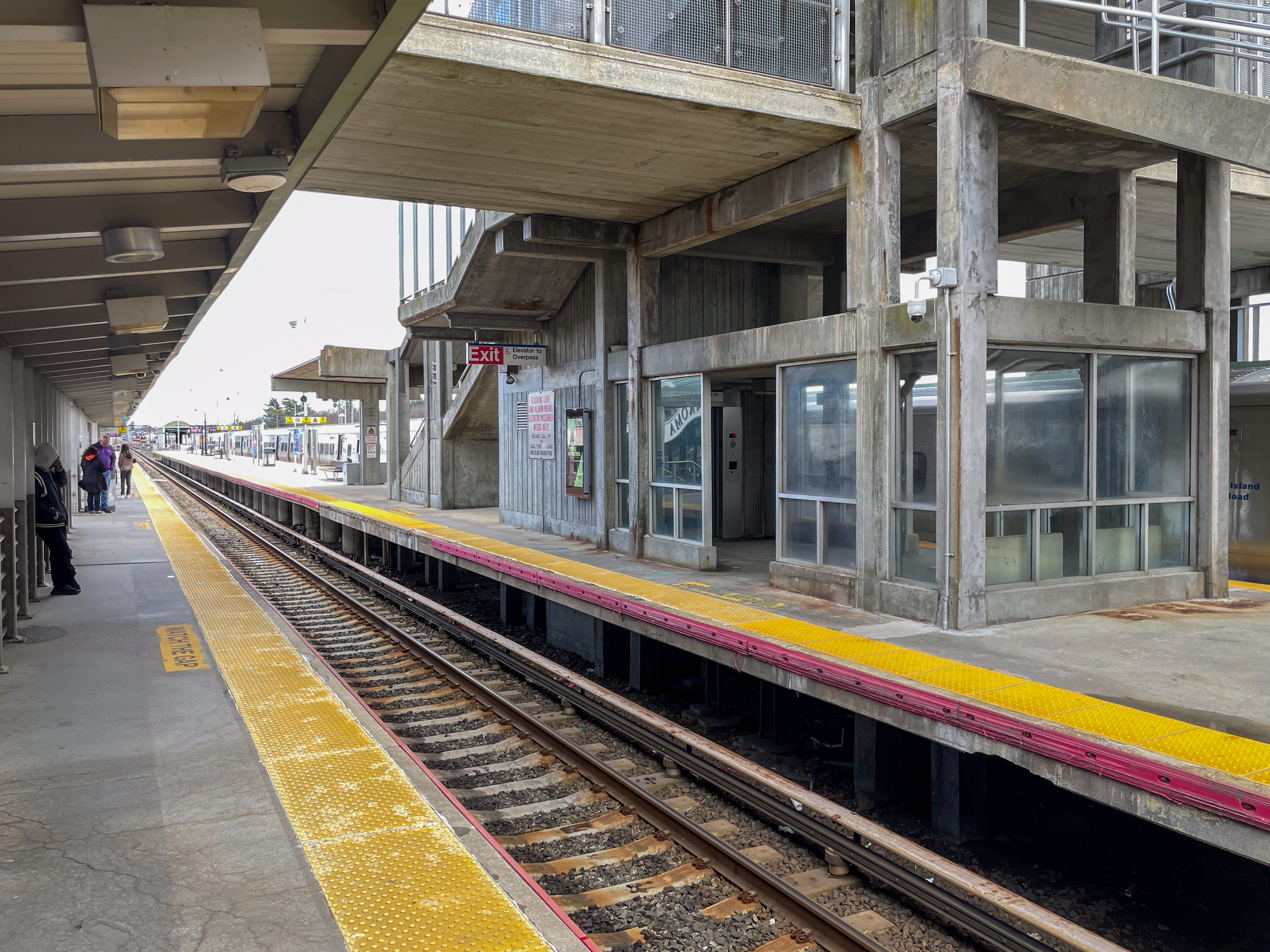
The platforms at the station in 2024

Ronkonkoma Station was originally built as Lake Ronkonkoma station in 1883 as a replacement for the 1843-built Lakeland station designed to serve both Lakeland and Ronkonkoma, New York, as well as the 1853-built Hermanville station, designed for a former community along the south side of the tracks.

=== Lake Road and Lakeland stations ===
Lakeland was originally built in 1843 as Lake Road station. It was named for and located on Lake Road (now Pond Road), a street that once ran from Oakdale to the east side of Lake Ronkonkoma itself. By 1850 it was moved to the Dr. E. F. Peck General Store on the northwest corner of what is today Ocean Avenue and Lakeland Street. A freight house existed along the tracks close to Pine Avenue. Edgar Fenn Peck owned land as far south as Sayville, and in 1851 sold the store and the land to a developer named Charles Wood, who turned his land into a development named Lakeland Farms, which today includes land in Oakdale, Bohemia, and what is now Ronkonkoma. The original Lake Road station operated simultaneously with the one at the general store on Ocean Avenue, and at some point was renamed "Lake station," until eventually being phased out. No record of the original station's existence can be found after 1857.

=== Hermanville station ===
Hermanville or Hermannville was another station stop along the Greenport Branch of the Long Island Rail Road, located east of the former Lake Road Station. It first appeared on an 1850 map of the Long Island Rail Road. The station had one side platform, and two tracks. An 1852 advertisement for Hermanville in a few books mention the Long Island Rail Road. Hermannville also made an appearance on the 1855 Colton map. On the Map of The Village of Hermannville, Town of Islip, Suffolk County, Long Island, Hemannville station is shown as being at the intersection of the Main Line and Herman Avenue, which today is part of the Ronkonkoma Yard.

=== After Lakeland ===
Lake Ronkonkoma station replaced Lakeland station in 1883 and was designed to serve both Lakeland and Ronkonkoma, New York. At some point, the word "Lake" was dropped from the station name. The station house burned on February 7, 1933 and a temporary rectangular one-story building with a gabled roof was used until September 1937, when the second Ronkonkoma station was completed. Throughout much of the 20th century, it also served as a sizable freight hub for central Suffolk County.

Since December 28, 1987, the present Ronkonkoma station has been the east end of the electrified portion of the Main Line, but stations east of Ronkonkoma have been modified to allow for electrification in the future. The 1937 station was used for storage until it was razed in 1994 when part of the station's parking lot was extended westward. The current station was designed by architect Richard Henry Behr.

Ronkonkoma Yard is also located east of the station, in close proximity to the former Holbrook station, which was torn down in 1962. Ronkonkoma station has also served commuters from the former Holtsville station since its closure in March 1998.

== Station layout ==
This station is set up using the Spanish solution with three high-level platforms, each 12 cars long. Platform B, an island platform, facilitates a cross-platform interchange when a Ronkonkoma Branch train and a Greenport train arrive at the same time on opposite tracks.

== Future ==
=== Airport terminal connector ===
In February 2024, the Federal Aviation Administration approved the Town of Islip's plan to erect a new airport terminal on the north side of MacArthur Airport, adjacent to the south side of the Ronkonkoma LIRR station. The project will directly connect the Ronkonkoma LIRR station with the new airport terminal via a pedestrian walkway, creating a direct LIRR connection to the airport without needing to transfer to buses or taxis.

In February 2025, New York state announced that it is investing $150 million into the construction of the pedestrian connection between the station and new airport terminal.

=== Amtrak service ===
In January 2025, Suffolk County Executive Edward Romaine, along with Amtrak officials, officially announced that a new Long Island branch of Amtrak's Northeast Regional would serve – and terminate at – the Ronkonkoma station, with intermediate stops at Jamaica and Hicksville east of Penn Station. It was reported that work was expected to begin in 2026, and that Amtrak service was anticipated to commence in 2028, at the earliest. Trains would operate using diesel on Long Island. Required infrastructure upgrades for the service would likely include an additional platform and track at the station. Suffolk County Executive Ed Romaine said that Amtrak wanted the extension, in part, due to the Ronkonkoma station's location adjacent to Long Island MacArthur Airport.

In 2026, the MTA and New York state announced further upgrades along the Ronkonkoma Branch – including grade crossing eliminations – will be completed, coinciding with the Amtrak plans.

=== Bus depot ===
In January 2025, it was announced by Suffolk County that, in addition to the new Amtrak service at Ronkonkoma, a new passenger bus depot will also be built on the south side the station, primarily serving Suffolk County Transit buses.

== In popular culture ==
- In The Oh, Hello Show, John Mulaney's character, George St. Geegland, wrote a book, Next Stop: Ronkonkoma. The book, which is over 1,000 pages in length, is the story of 100 people on a train on Long Island.
- The Ronkonkoma station is referenced in singer/songwriter Mike Doughty's song, "Like a Luminous Girl."

== Mid-Suffolk Yard ==
The Mid-Suffolk Yard – also known as the Ronkonkoma Yard – is a 23-track train storage yard, located just to the east of the Ronkonkoma Long Island Rail Road station. As this is the eastern end of the electrified portion of the Main Line, the yard stores the LIRR's electric multiple unit train sets that are used on the Ronkonkoma Branch.

In preparation for the LIRR's East Side Access expansion to Grand Central Terminal, the MTA added 11 new tracks to the yard, for a total of 23 tracks. The expansion used space already owned by the MTA, located immediately to the south of the existing rail yard and north of MacArthur Airport. The increase in storage space allowed the MTA to increase peak-hour service to Manhattan. The project was budgeted for $128 million. Locations in Deer Park, Central Islip, and Yaphank were also considered for the construction of the yard. The Deer Park option was dismissed as it would have impacted several grade crossings, duplicated employee facilities and as it would not have benefited riders east of the station. The Central Islip site was dismissed as it would have been located within Connetquot River State Park Preserve. The Yaphank option was rejected because of the high cost of electrification, as well as due to the requirement that all stations between Ronkonkoma and Yaphank – namely, Medford and Yaphank – receive upgrades.

The construction work was initially expected to be finished by late 2018. Construction was to start in September 2017, with completion being pushed back to March 2020. A construction award was finally made in December 2017, and the completion date was pushed back to late 2020. The yard was ultimately completed in November 2020.

== See also ==
- List of Long Island Rail Road stations
- Ronkonkoma Branch
- Jamaica station
- Babylon station
- Long Island MacArthur Airport
