= Village of the Landing, New York =

Coordinates: 40°51′41″N 73°11′48″W

Village of the Landing
- Former village
- Incorporated Village of the Landing
- Interactive map of Village of the Landing
- Country: United States
- State: New York
- County: Suffolk
- Town: Smithtown
- Incorporated: 1927
- Dissolved: May 25, 1939

Population (1930)
  - Total: 144

Village of the Landing (also known as the Landing) was a short-lived incorporated village in the Town of Smithtown in Suffolk County, on Long Island, in New York, United States. The population was 144 in the 1930 United States census. The Landing is now listed by the Geographic Names Information System as an unincorporated place in Suffolk County.

== History ==
The Village of the Landing incorporated in 1927 by a 12–7 vote. It was incorporated because locals wanted local zoning control and were against having a public water supply service the area.

Despite the efforts locals made in incorporating their village, a lack of public interest in the village by locals proved to be detrimental to the new village; locals did not usually attend village meetings. This lack of interest is contributed to the Village of the Landing being dissolved on May 25, 1939, after 17 out of 38 voters voted in favor of dissolving the village.

It is known that the Village of the Landing allowed duplex properties to be erected, as per its zoning laws.

== Geography ==
The area which formerly was within the borders of the Village of the Landing is now part of the unincorporated hamlet of Smithtown.

== Demographics ==
When the village first incorporated, the population was 161.

Historical population
Census	Pop.	Note	%±
1930	144		—

As of the 1930 census, 144 people lived in the Village of the Landing.

When the village was disincorporated, the population was 140.

A large number of the people represented by those figures were relatives of families or were their servants.

== Government ==
The Village of the Branch had 2 mayors:

- George Strong (1927–1936)
- William Leonori Jr. (1936–1939)

== Infrastructure ==
The Village of the Landing maintained roughly 4 miles (6.4 km) of roads. Upon disincorporation, the oversight and maintenance of the roads were given to the Town of Smithtown.

== See also ==
- Pine Valley – Another former village in Suffolk County.
