= Holbrook station =

Former train station in New York, US

Holbrook
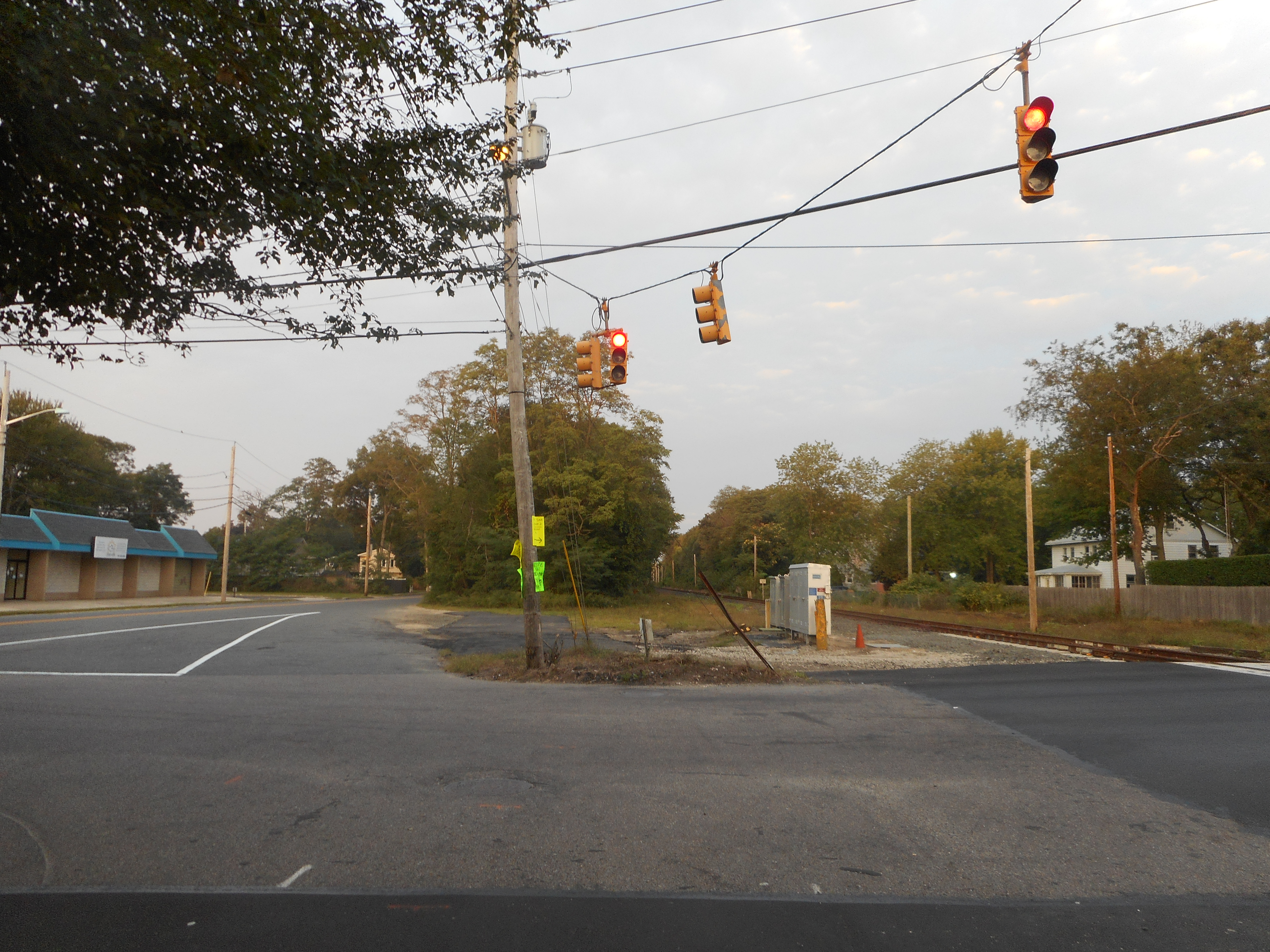
- Westbound view of the site of the former Holbrook LIRR station

General information
- Location: Coates Avenue and Railroad Avenue; Holbrook, New York, US
- Coordinates: 40.810272°N 73.081330°W
- Owner: Long Island Rail Road
- Line: Main Line
- Platforms: 1 side platform
- Tracks: 2

Other information
- Station code: None

History
- Opened: 1875
- Closed: June 1962
- Rebuilt: 1907

Former services
Preceding station	Long Island Rail Road	Following station
Ronkonkoma toward Long Island City or Penn Station	Main Line	Holtsville toward Greenport
Location

Holbrook was a station stop along the Greenport Branch of the Long Island Rail Road. The most recent version was located along Coates Avenue and Railroad Avenue in Holbrook, New York.

== History ==
The original version of Holbrook LIRR station was combined into a cigar factory owned by Colonel Alexander McCotter between June and July 1875. McCotter had already owned 5,000 acres (2,000 ha) of land expanding as far south as the Great South Bay dating back to 1848, which he subdivided in 5 to 10 acres (2.0 to 4.0 ha) lots. The factory was a 40x40 two stories high building surmounted with a cupola. Half of the ground floor was used as a ticket office, express office, and waiting room, while the rest of the building was used for the factory.

The second station opened around 1907 on the north side of the train tracks. It was moved to the south side on April 29, 1939, and finally closed in June 1962, although the sheltered shed lasted as long as 1970. This station was located between Ronkonkoma and Holtsville stations on Coates Avenue in Holbrook, and is close to where the Ronkonkoma Yard can be found today.
