= Hallock-Bilunas Farmstead =

Historic house in New York, United States

- U.S. National Register of Historic Places
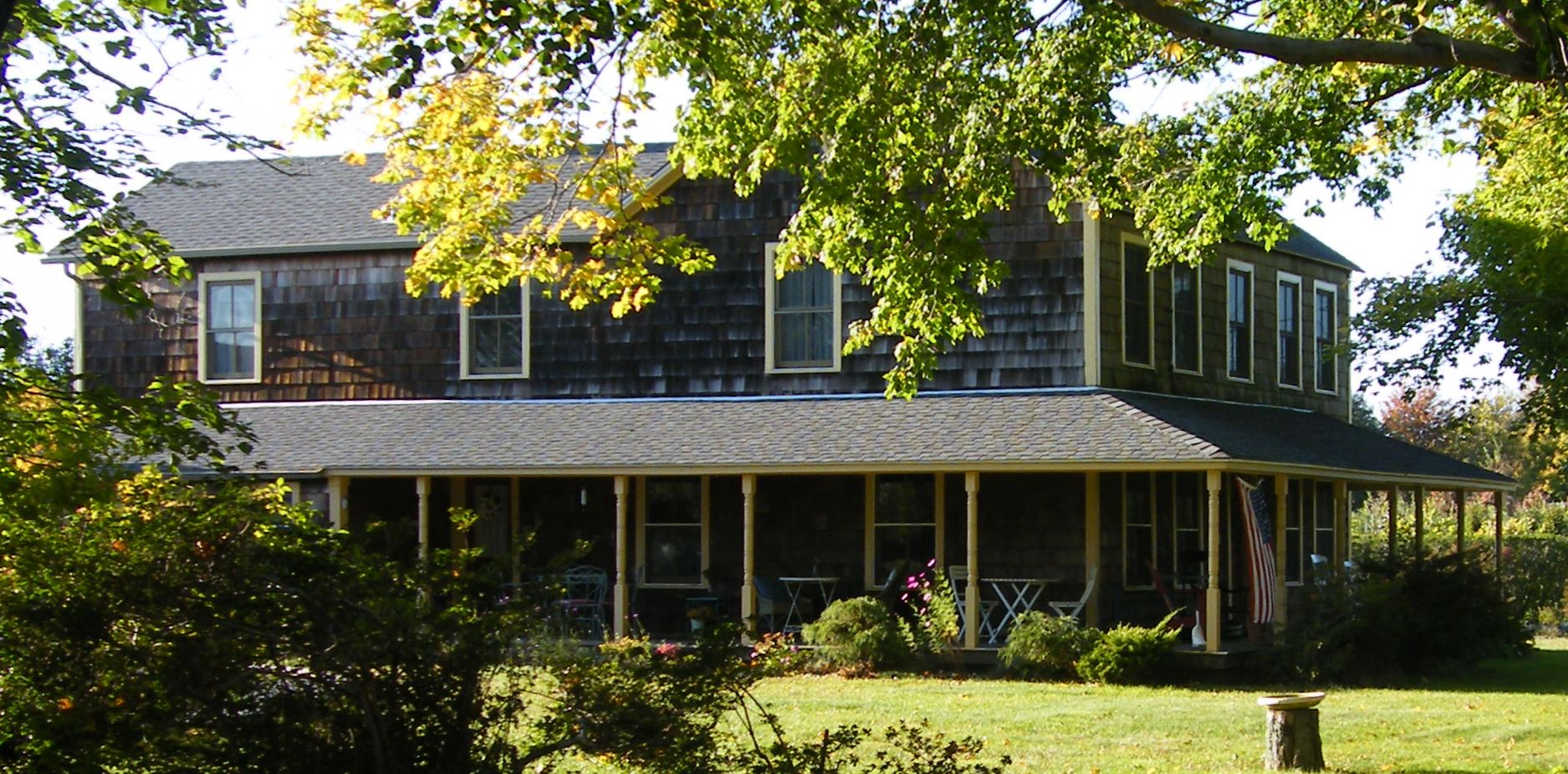
- Hallock-Bilunas Farmstead, October 2008

- Location within New York Location within the United States
- Nearest city: Jamesport, New York
- Coordinates: 40°58′42″N 72°35′30″W
- Area: 2 acres (0.81 ha)
- Built: 1880
- NRHP reference No.: 03000251
- Added to NRHP: April 18, 2003

Hallock-Bilunas Farmstead is a historic farm complex located at Jamesport in Suffolk County, New York. The farmstead includes seven contributing buildings: the farmhouse, barns, sheds, workshops, and other accessory structures. The farmhouse was built in 1880, and is a two-story gable-roofed residence clad in wood shingles and wrapped by an open porch on the south and east elevations.

It was added to the National Register of Historic Places in 2003.
