= Tuthill-Lapham House =

Historic house in New York, United States

- U.S. National Register of Historic Places
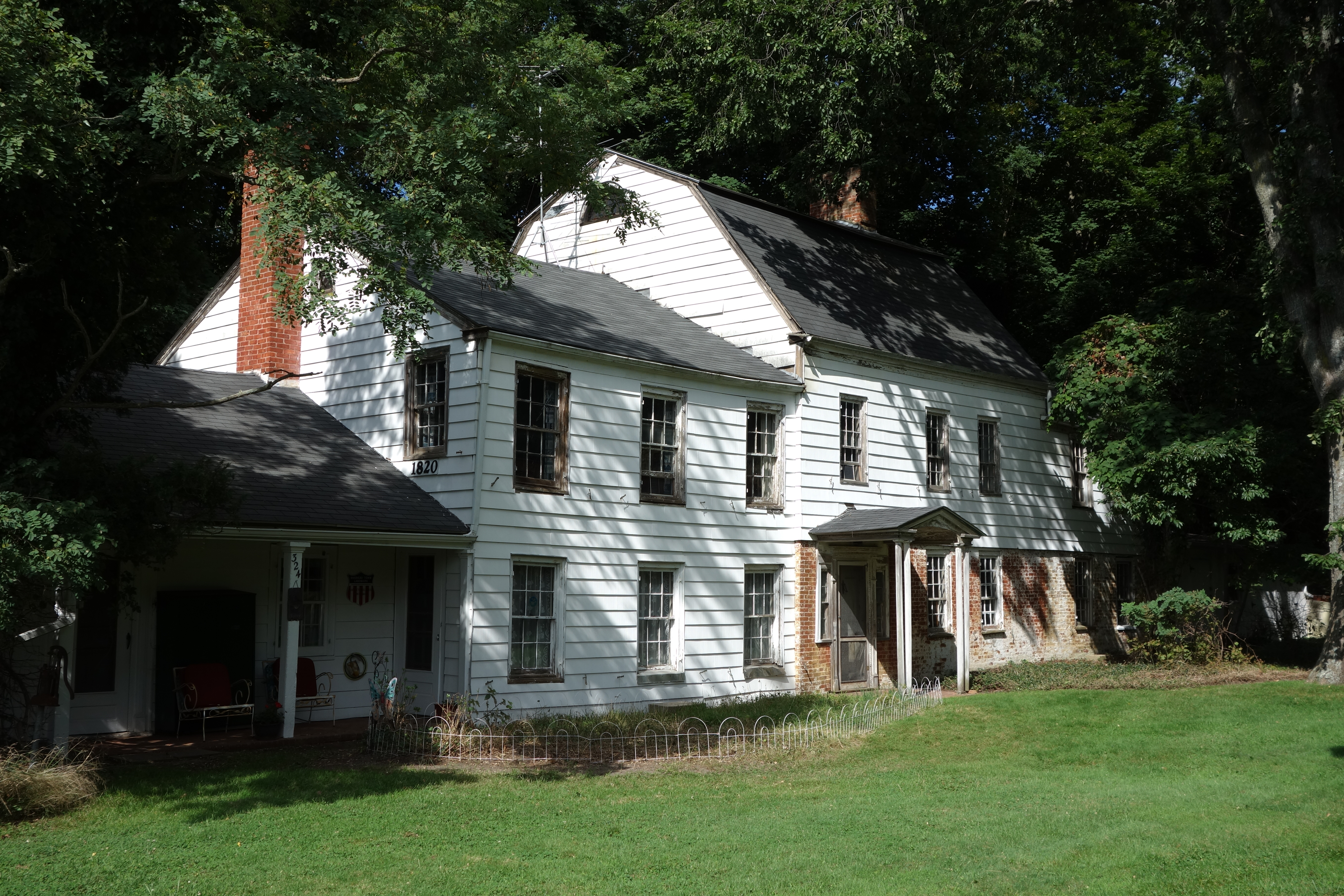
- The Tuthill-Lapham House as seen from the northeast corner of Sound Road and Sunset Boulevard.

- Location within New York Location within the United States
- Location: 324 Sound Road, at the corner of Sunset Boulevard, Wading River, New York
- Coordinates: 40°57′52.6″N 72°51′7.53″W
- Area: 0.9 acres (0.36 ha)
- Built: 1820
- Architectural style: Federal
- NRHP reference No.: 09000136
- Added to NRHP: March 13, 2009

Tuthill-Lapham House, also known as Friendly Hall, is a historic home located at Wading River in Suffolk County, New York. The oldest section is a Federal style three story building with a gambrel roof, built around 1820. Attached is an addition from 1838 and a two-story addition to the west dated 1869. A kitchen wing was added in the 1920s.

It was added to the National Register of Historic Places in 2009.
