= Jamesport Meeting House =

Historic meetinghouse in New York, United States

- U.S. National Register of Historic Places
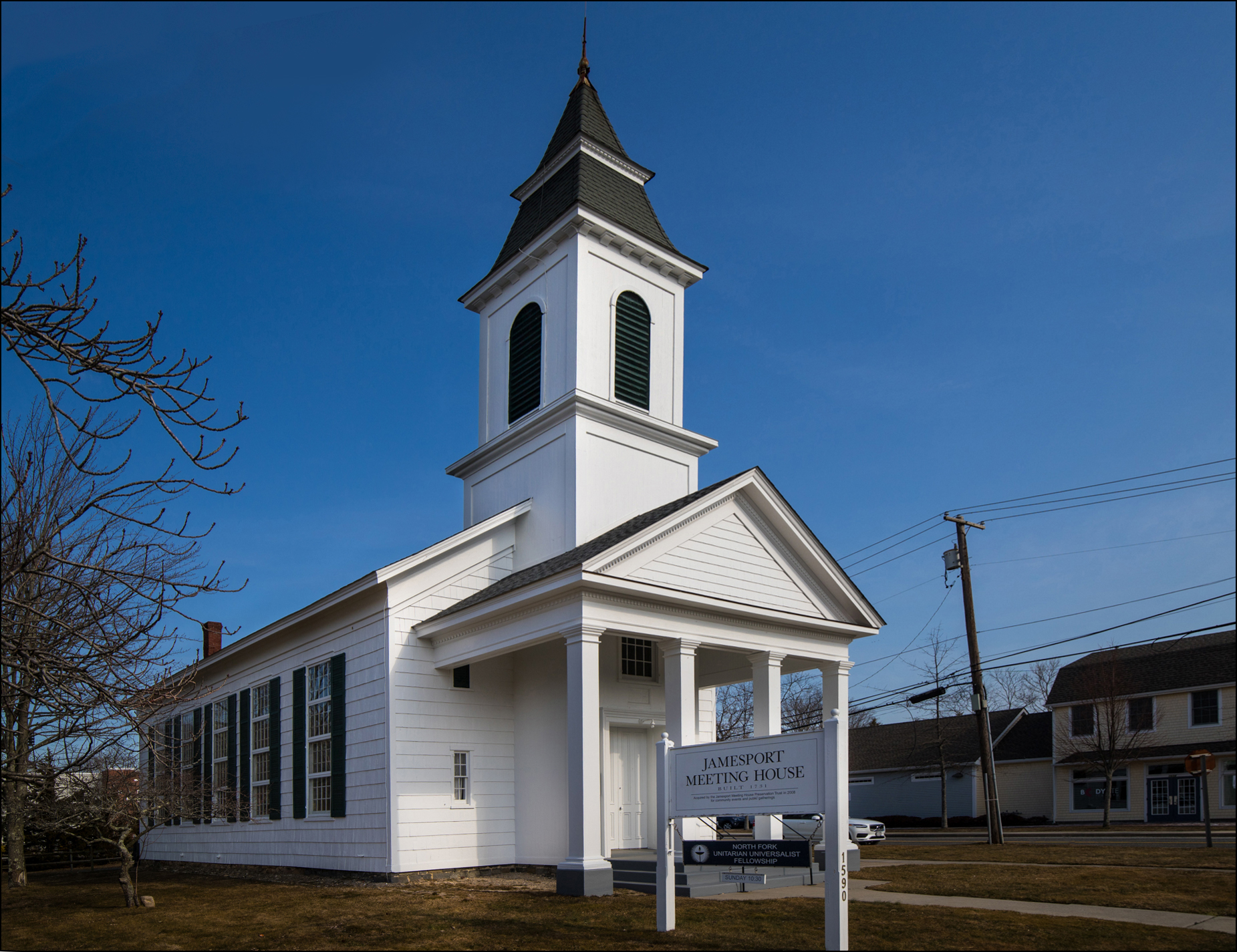
- Jamesport Meeting House in 2021

- Location within New York Location within the United States
- Location: 1590 Main Road, Jamesport, New York
- Coordinates: 40°56′59.62″N 72°34′51.78″W
- Area: 0.9 acres (0.36 ha)
- Built: 1731
- NRHP reference No.: 09000039
- Added to NRHP: February 20, 2009

Jamesport Meeting House is a historic meeting house located at Jamesport in Suffolk County, New York. It is in the form of a 2-story gable-fronted building with a 1 1/2-story wing to the east. It features an open bell tower topped by a two-tiered, four-sided Mansard roof.

Built in 1731, it originally served as a Puritan meeting house and house of worship. It now serves as a Unitarian Universalist church and a non-profit community center.

It was added to the National Register of Historic Places in 2009.
