= Medford station =

Long Island Rail Road station in Suffolk County, New York

Medford
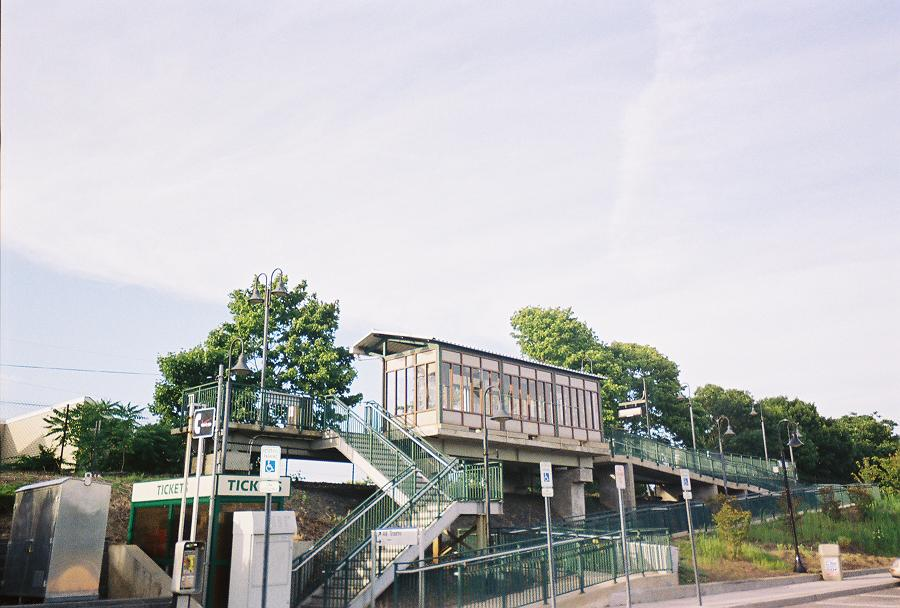
- The Medford station, seen from the parking lot in 2007

General information
- Location: NY 112 and Railroad Avenue; Medford, New York
- Coordinates: 40.817356°N 72.999159°W
- Owner: Long Island Rail Road
- Line: Main Line
- Distance: 54.1 mi (87.1 km) from Long Island City
- Platforms: 1 side platform
- Tracks: 1
- Connections: Suffolk County Transit: 55

Construction
- Parking: Yes; Free
- Accessible: Yes

Other information
- Station code: MFD
- Fare zone: 10

History
- Opened: June 26, 1844
- Rebuilt: 1889, 1940, 2000–2001

Passengers
- 2012—2014: 42 per weekday

Services
Preceding station	Long Island Rail Road	Following station
Ronkonkoma Terminus	Ronkonkoma Branch Greenport Branch	Yaphank–BNL toward Greenport
Former services
Preceding station	Long Island Rail Road	Following station
Ronkonkoma Terminus	Ronkonkoma Branch Greenport Branch	Yaphank toward Greenport
Location

Medford is a station in the hamlet of Medford, New York on the Main Line (Greenport Branch) of the Long Island Rail Road. Medford is located on New York State Route 112, between Peconic Avenue and Long Island Avenue.

Access to the station is available from a narrow, curving roadway leading off NY 112. This roadway used to connect with the Ohio Avenue intersection until Ohio Avenue was closed north of Peconic Avenue in 2007. It is also accessible from the north end of Oregon Avenue, although the Medford Fire Department periodically closes the Oregon Avenue access road for drills or other exercises.

== History ==
Medford station was originally opened on June 26, 1844 when the main line terminated at the former Carman's River station east of Yaphank station. On August 20, 1863, the station burned down, but wasn't rebuilt until 1889. This version was a two-story structure located near an at-grade crossing with NY 112, which was considered one of the LIRR's most dangerous. Demands for a bridge to be erected, to carry the trains over the roadway and thereby eliminate the crossing, were ignored throughout the 1920s and 1930s. Only when a relative of a government official was killed at the crossing in 1940, was there any effort to build a bridge over NY 112. When the tracks were elevated, the station was rebuilt as a two-level station house along the embankment with the passenger waiting area on the top floor and an REA Express freight depot near the parking lot at ground-level. The bridge across NY 112, which has a low clearance of 12 feet, 9 inches (3.9 m), was designed for two tracks, but the second track was abandoned in the early 1960s. The station house was closed in 1958, with the first floor blocked off and second floor torn down in 1964 and filled in with dirt. A small wooden shelter was added to the platform in 1988, and was later replaced by a plexiglass one.

In the late 1990s, the station was rebuilt again in preparation for the new fleet of double-decker coaches, which require high-level platforms for boarding, and for future electrification of the line. In the rebuilding, the former ground-level platform was elevated, with a new stairway and a wheelchair access ramp from the parking area, and a small shelter was constructed at platform level.

A team track for freight service, provided by the New York and Atlantic Railway, since 1997, and formerly by the LIRR, for off-line customers, exists along the south side embankment of the track. This has been in place for several nearby building-products companies and their predecessors for many years since the elevation over NY 112 in the 1940s. When the Holtsville station was closed on March 16, 1998, commuters from that station were advised to use both Medford and Ronkonkoma stations – although more use Ronkonkoma.

The Medford station also contains a memorial to the victims of the September 11, 2001 terrorist attacks.

== Station layout ==
This station has one high-level side platform south of the track that is long enough for one and a half cars to receive and discharge passengers. Other than the freight spur served by the New York and Atlantic Railway noted above, the Main Line has one track at this location.

=== Parking ===
Free, unrestricted parking is available on the south side of the station. The Medford station's parking lot is operated and maintained by the Long Island Rail Road.

== Gallery ==
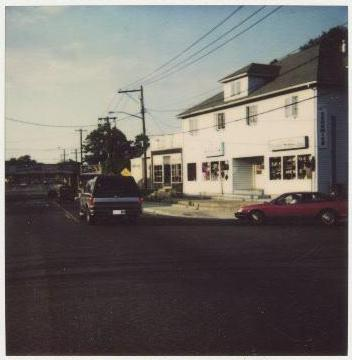
NY 112 near 1940-built LIRR Bridge; Taken 1986-1994.

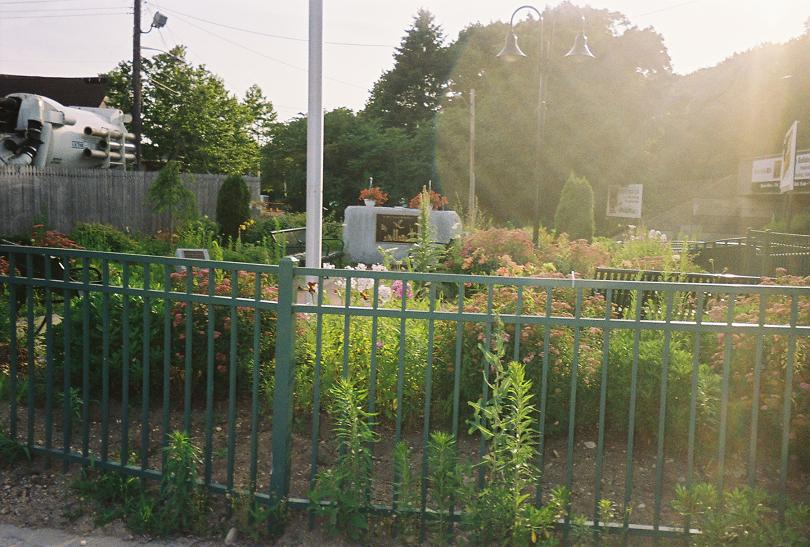
Medford station's September 11, 2001 Memorial Garden

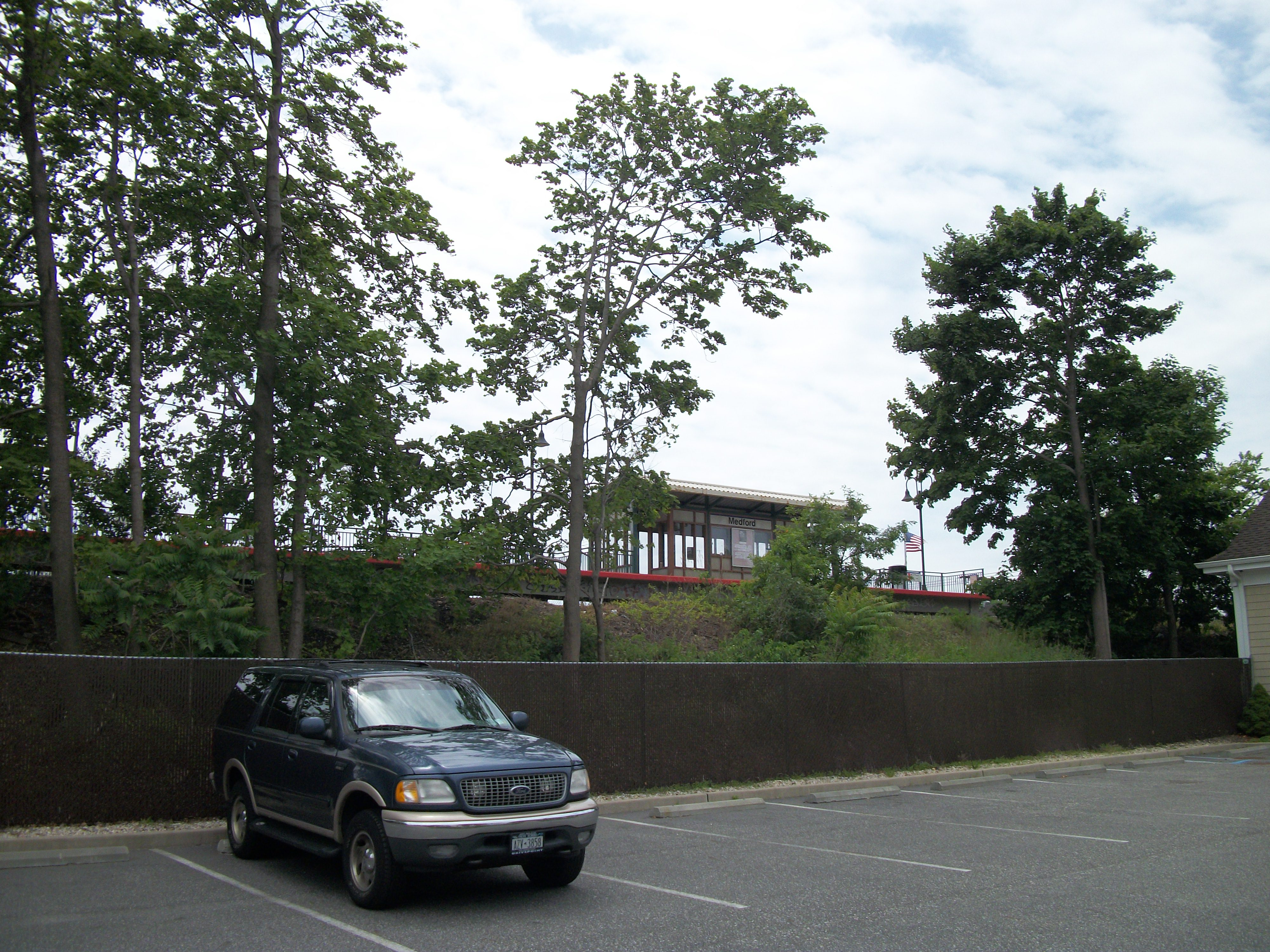
Medford station as seen from Long Island Avenue on the north side of the tracks.

== LIRR Demonstration Farm #2 ==
Due to the success of the Long Island Rail Road Demonstration Farm on the Wading River Branch, a second one opened east of Medford station from 1907-1927. The site was also known as the Medford Prosperity Farm, and the remainder of site of the farm can be found near the Horse Block Road bridge over Long Island Avenue. Former President Theodore Roosevelt visited the farm on his 1910 "Whistle-Stop Campaign."

== See also ==
- List of Long Island Rail Road stations
- History of the Long Island Rail Road
