= Riverhead Main Street Historic District =

- U.S. National Register of Historic Places
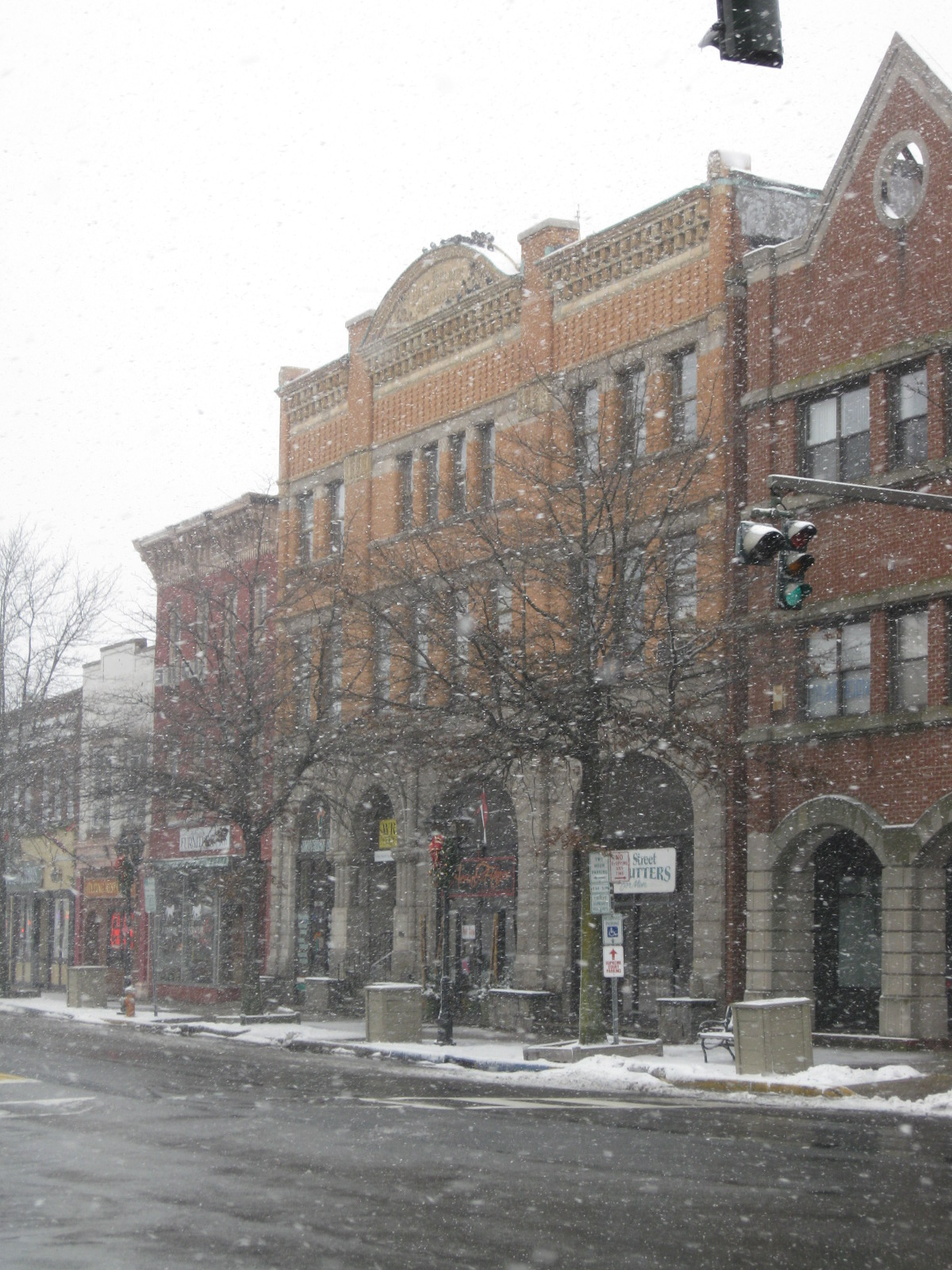
- Building in the Riverhead Main Street Historic District, January 2010

- Location within New York
- Location: Roughly E. & W. Main Sts., Griffing, Roanoke, Maple, & Peconic Aves., Riverhead, New York
- Coordinates: 40°55′03″N 72°39′39″W
- Area: 16.2 acres (6.6 ha)
- Built: 1840
- Architectural style: Late Victorian, Late 19th And 20th Century Revivals, Greek Revival
- NRHP reference No.: 12000512
- Added to NRHP: August 14, 2012

The Riverhead Main Street Historic District is a historic district located in Riverhead, New York. The district contains 46 contributing buildings in a variety of 19th and 20th century architectural styles.

It was added to the National Register of Historic Places in 2012.
