= Jamesport, New York =

- Hamlet and census-designated place
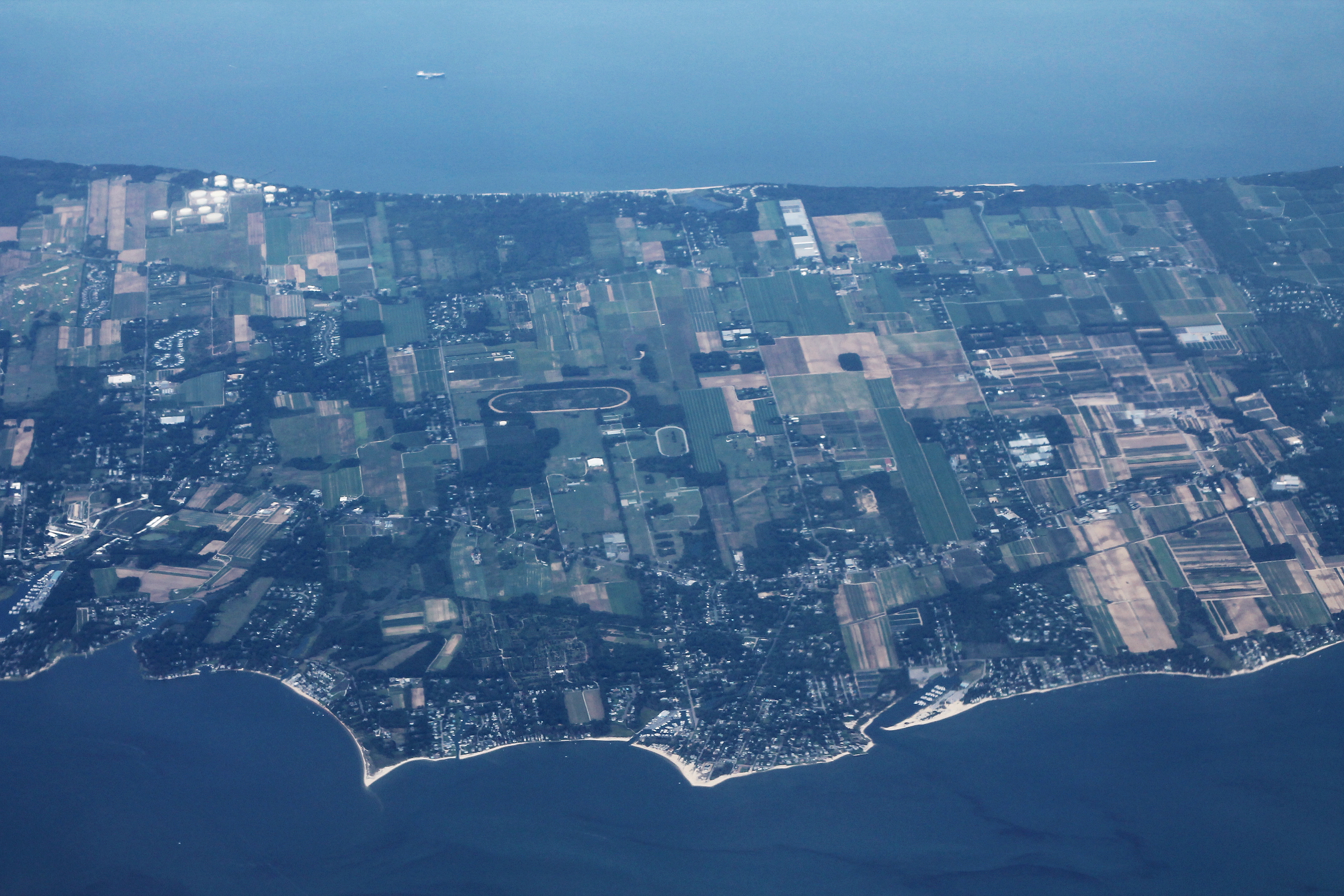
- Aerial view of Jamesport, New York

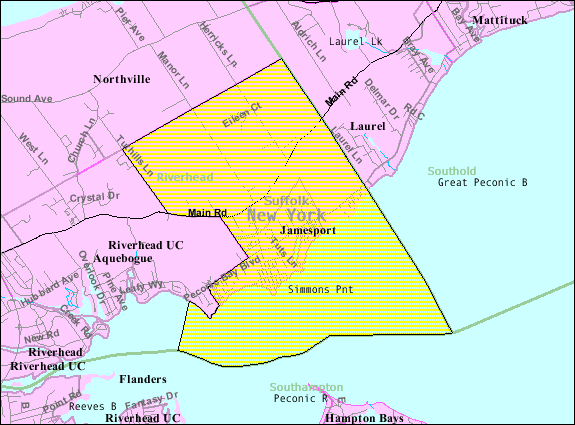

- Location within Long Island Location within New York Location within the United States
- Coordinates: 40°56′40″N 72°34′38″W
- Country: United States
- State: New York
- County: Suffolk
- Town: Riverhead

Area
  - Total: 4.53 sq mi (11.72 km^{2})
  - Land: 4.50 sq mi (11.65 km^{2})
  - Water: 0.027 sq mi (0.07 km^{2})
- Elevation: 16 ft (5 m)

Population (2020)
  - Total: 1,609
  - Density: 6,340/sq mi (2,449/km^{2})
- Time zone: UTC-5 (Eastern (EST))
  - Summer (DST): UTC-4 (EDT)
- ZIP code: 11947
- Area code: 631
- FIPS code: 36-38253
- GNIS feature ID: 0953924

Jamesport is a hamlet and census-designated place in Riverhead, Suffolk County, New York, on the North Shore of Long Island. As of the 2020 census, Jamesport had a population of 1,609.

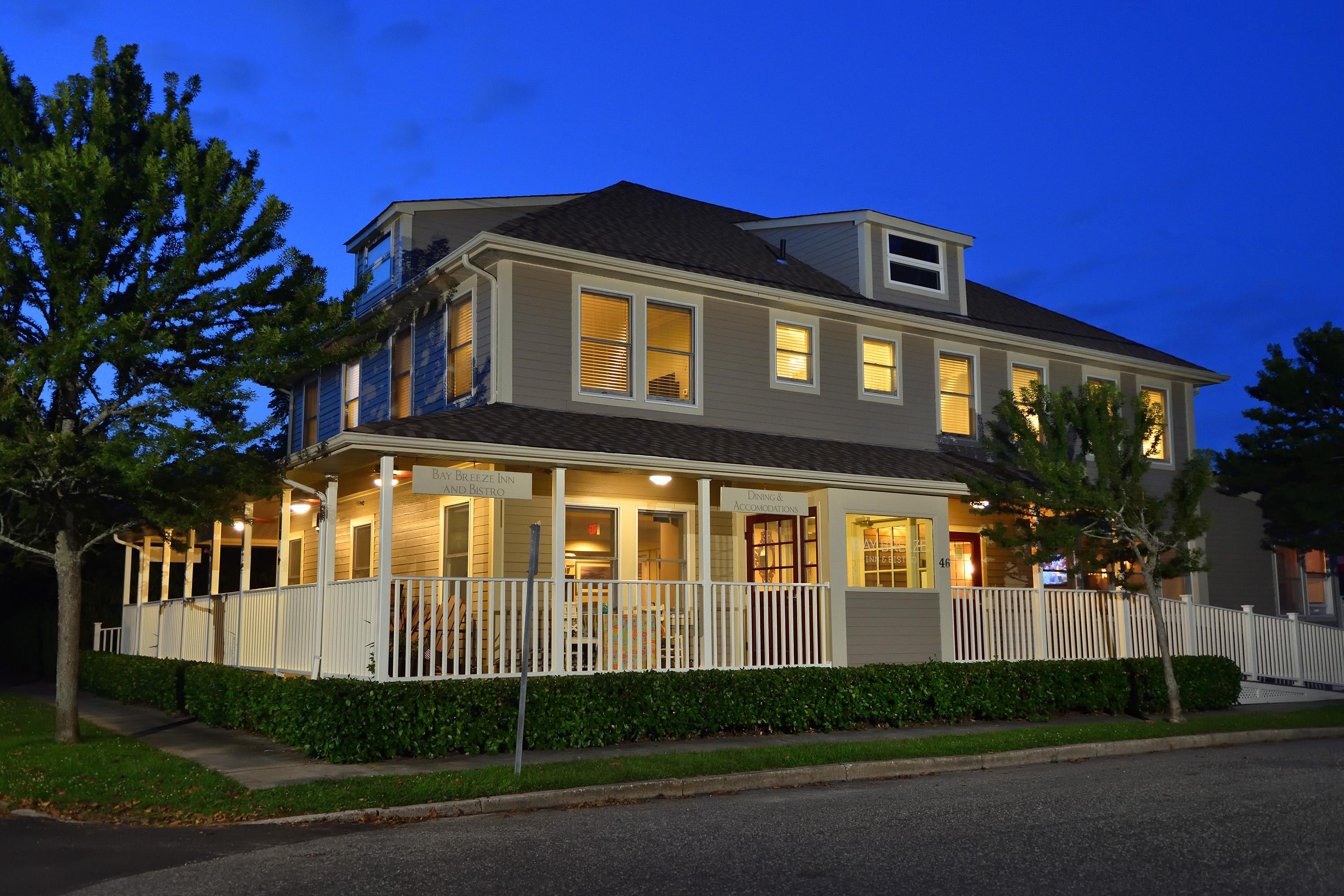
Bay Breeze Inn in South Jamesport.

Jamesport consists of a downtown area and surrounding farms.

Hallock State Park Preserve (previously Jamesport State Park) is located north of Jamesport in the adjacent village of Northville.

== Geography ==
The United States Census Bureau has estimated that Jamesport has a total area of 4.5 square miles (11.7 km^{2}), of which just under 4.5 square miles (11.6 km^{2}) is land and 0.039 square miles (0.1 km^{2}), or 0.60%, is water.

== History ==
Jamesport was first settled in the 1690s and was originally called "Aquebogue." It was renamed "Lower Aquebogue" when another hamlet called "Upper Aquebogue" was established to the west. The Jamesport Meeting House, built in 1731, is the oldest operating church building in Suffolk County

"Jamesport" is named for James Tuthill, who settled with his family in the area south of Lower Aquebogue, on the Peconic Bay, in 1833. Over time, Lower Aquebogue came to be called Jamesport, while the community 1 mile (2 km) to the south, previously called Jamesport, came to be called South Jamesport (and is included in the present-day Jamesport CDP). Upper Aquebogue became Aquebogue.

James Tuthill tried to establish a commercial whaling and shipping wharf on the Peconic Bay, in what is now South Jamesport . But the effort was unsuccessful, because the water in the Bay at low tide was too shallow to accommodate ships. However, the Long Island Rail Road established service between Jamesport and New York City, after which Jamesport became a popular resort area, with several large bayfront hotels. These included the Miamogue Hotel and the Great Peconic Bay House, which operated until 1952. Jamesport also became a thriving fishing community, and was a center for scallop and bunker (menhaden) fisheries.

From the 1830s to about 1950, Jamesport was the site of a camp meeting grove operated by the Methodist Episcopal Church, and after 1904, of an Epworth League Fresh Air Camp.

During the 1960s, the Long Island Lighting Company (LILCO) designated land adjacent to the Long Island Sound near Northville for use as the proposed Jamesport Nuclear Power Plant, in addition to its Shoreham plant, which was already under construction. However, the Jamesport plan was scrapped when LILCO ran into opposition to Shoreham in the 1970s and 1980s.

== Demographics ==
Historical population
Census	Pop.	Note	%±
2010	31,146		—
2020	1,609		−94.8%
U.S. Decennial Census

As of the 2020 census, there were 1,609 people, 469 households, and 1,126 housing units in Jamesport. The population density was 216.0 per square mile. The ethnic makeup of the CDP was 88.6% White, 11% Hispanic or Latino (of any ethnicity), 1.5% African American, 0.4% Asian, 0.06% Pacific Islander, 0.43% “other ethnicities”, and 0.48% people of two or more ethnicities.

Of the 469 households, 56.7% were married couples living together, 29.4% had a female householder with no spouse present, and 3.2% had a male householder with no spouse present.

Minors made up 10.2% of the population, and 9.9% of the population were living below the poverty line.

== Schools ==
- Mattituck-Cutchogue Union Free School District (small eastern portion of CDP of Jamesport)
- Riverhead Central School District (majority of CDP of Jamesport)
