= Northville, Suffolk County, New York =

Northville, New York Sound Avenue, New York
- Hamlet and census-designated place Former village
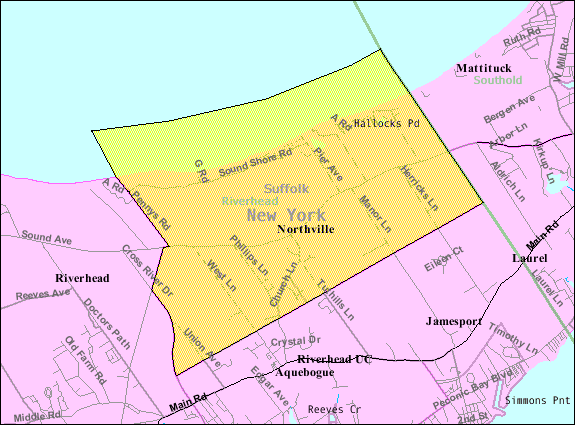
- U.S. Census map of Northville

- Location on Long Island Location within the state of New York
- Coordinates: 40°58′3″N 72°37′27″W
- Country: United States
- State: New York
- County: Suffolk
- Town: Riverhead
- Incorporated: 1921
- Dissolved: 1930

Area
  - Total: 9.65 sq mi (24.99 km^{2})
  - Land: 7.40 sq mi (19.16 km^{2})
  - Water: 2.25 sq mi (5.83 km^{2})

Population (2020)
  - Total: 1,566
  - Density: 211.7/sq mi (81.73/km^{2})
- Time zone: UTC-5 (Eastern (EST))
  - Summer (DST): UTC-4 (EDT)
- ZIP code: 11901
- Area codes: 631, 934
- FIPS code: 36-53775

Northville is a hamlet and census-designated place (CDP) located within the Town of Riverhead in Suffolk County, on Long Island, in New York, United States. The population was 1,566 at the time of the 2020 census.

Between 1921 and 1930, it was an incorporated village known originally as the Incorporated Village of Sound Avenue, and from 1927 to 1930 as the Incorporated Village of Northville.

== History ==
Northville was an incorporated village between 1921 and 1930. The village incorporated in 1921 as the Incorporated Village of Sound Avenue, changing its name to the Incorporated Village of Northville in 1927.

== Geography ==
According to the United States Census Bureau, the CDP has a total area of 7.4 square miles (19.2 km^{2}), of which 0.02 square miles (0.05 km^{2}), or 0.28%, is water.

== Demographics ==
Historical population
Census	Pop.	Note	%±
2000	801		—
2010	1,340		67.3%
2020	1,566		16.9%
U.S. Decennial Census

As of the census of 2000, there were 801 people, 296 households, and 224 families residing in the CDP. The population density was 108.1 inhabitants per square mile (41.7/km^{2}). There were 401 housing units at an average density of 54.1 per square mile (20.9/km^{2}). The racial makeup of the CDP was 93.26% White, 3.87% African American, 0.12% Native American, 0.25% Asian, 0.62% Pacific Islander, 0.12% from other races, and 1.75% from two or more races. Hispanic or Latino of any race were 4.87% of the population.

There were 296 households, out of which 30.7% had children under the age of 18 living with them, 65.9% were married couples living together, 6.1% had a female householder with no husband present, and 24.0% were non-families. 18.6% of all households were made up of individuals, and 7.1% had someone living alone who was 65 years of age or older. The average household size was 2.59 and the average family size was 2.96.

In the CDP, the population was spread out, with 22.3% under the age of 18, 4.7% from 18 to 24, 30.2% from 25 to 44, 27.6% from 45 to 64, and 15.1% who were 65 years of age or older. The median age was 41 years. For every 100 females, there were 108.6 males. For every 100 females age 18 and over, there were 108.7 males.

The median income for a household in the CDP was $57,188, and the median income for a family was $68,571. Males had a median income of $42,500 versus $40,294 for females. The per capita income for the CDP was $28,547. None of the families and 2.6% of the population were living below the poverty line, including no under eighteens and none of those over 64.

== See also ==
- Northville, Fulton County, New York – A village of the same name in Fulton County, New York.
- Pine Valley, Suffolk County, New York – A former incorporated village in the adjacent town, Southampton.
