= Kings Park High School =

Location
- 200 Route 25A; Kings Park, New York 11754; United States; 40°53′02″N 73°14′27″W

Information
- Type: Public secondary school
- Motto: Tradition of Excellence
- Established: 1964
- School district: Kings Park Central School District
- Principal: Alyse Clark
- Teaching staff: 83.57 (FTE)
- Grades: 9-12
- Gender: co-ed
- Enrollment: 832 (2023–2024)
- Student to teacher ratio: 9.96
- Colors: Maroon, gold, white, and black
- Nickname: Kingsmen
- Newspaper: The Kings Herald
- Yearbook: KPHS Kingsmen
- Website: hs.kpcsd.org

Kings Park High School is a four-year secondary school located in Kings Park, New York, United States. It is the only high school for Kings Park Central School District, which serves the majority of Kings Park, about half of Fort Salonga, as well as a small portion of Smithtown. All are located within the Town of Smithtown.

KPHS went through construction from 2005 to 2007, remodeling the lobby and cafeteria and again in 2018 to update their auditorium, library, and computer labs. The school principal as of Fall 2022 is Neil Lederer.

Prior to high school students either attend either Park View Elementary School, or Fort Salonga Elementary School, Ralph J. Osgood Intermediate School, and William T. Rogers Middle School.

== Demographics ==
The demographic breakdown of the 1,276 students enrolled in 2013-14 was:

- Male - 51.1%
- Female - 48.9%
- Native American/Alaskan - 0.1%
- Asian/Pacific Islanders - 3.2%
- Black - 0.5%
- Hispanic - 3.1%
- White - 93.1%

3.9% of the students were eligible for free or reduced lunch.

== Notable alumni ==
- Craig Biggio, Hall of Fame baseball player for the Houston Astros
- John Petrucci, guitarist for Dream Theater
