= San Remo, New York =

- Hamlet
- Location on Long Island Location within the state of New York
- Coordinates: 40°53′25″N 73°13′18″W
- Country: United States
- State: New York
- County: Suffolk
- Town: Smithtown
- First developed: 1920s
- Named for: Sanremo, Italy
- Postal codes: 11787, 11754
- Area codes: 631, 934

San Remo is a hamlet in the Town of Smithtown in Suffolk County, on Long Island, in New York, United States. It straddles the borders of the Smithtown CDP and the Kings Park CDP.

== History ==
San Remo was originally established as a summer colony in the 1920s. It was developed by the New York City-based Smadbeck Corporation over land formerly occupied by farms and woodlands. The Smadbeck Corporation developed San Remo by subdividing the land into roughly 5,000 lots – each being approximately 20' x 100' in size; this lot size was typical at the time for subdivisions constructed in New York City. It was advertised heavily by the newspaper Corriere D' America (later Il Progresso) – especially to Italian-Americans. The newspaper partnered with the developers, offering subscriptions to those who purchased the land. The subscription lengths varied by the number of lots purchased (i.e.: those who purchased 1 lot would receive a 1-year subscription, etc.).

During the years and decades following World War II, the summer colony began to see residents settle permanently, and many expanded their summer cottages in order to live in them year-round.

In the early 1950s, the San Remo Property Owner's Association (the local civic association) erected a clubhouse for the residents of the community.

In the 1960s, the New York State Department of Public Works proposed constructing a bypass of New York State Route 25A between San Remo and Stony Brook via a new crossing over the Nissequogue River. This would have allowed for NY 25A to bypass downtown Smithtown and Jericho Turnpike (NY 25). These plans were strongly opposed and were ultimately mothballed.

The Kings Park Central School District used to operate an elementary school within the neighborhood called the San Remo Elementary School. The San Remo Elementary School was closed by the district in the late 1980s and was then used for a few years by a preschool before ultimately being sold by the district to developers who built 30 homes in its place.

The former all-boys Franciscan Catholic school, St. Anthony's High School (now located in South Huntington, New York), used to be in San Remo as well; it was in the northwest of San Remo in the Smithtown CDP. It's now a park named with two names San Remo Park and Playground, and Franciscan Park, a direct nod to the former school, which is located in the same spot.

San Remo's name reflects how the area has been compared to a village on Northern Italy's Italian Riviera.

== Education ==
San Remo is located within both the Kings Park Central School District and the Smithtown Central School District. While Kings Park School district serves all of the residents of the CDP in Kings Park. It also serves some of the San Remo residents in the Smithtown CDP.

== Parks and recreation ==
The San Remo Property Owners Association maintains a park for residents only along the waterfront. Additionally, the Town of Smithtown operates and maintains a park called the San Remo Community Park.

== San Remo Property Owners Association ==
The San Remo Property Owners Association was founded in 1926. It serves as San Remo's civic association, and handles community-related matters, helps organize community activities.
