= New York State Route 25A =

Highway on Long Island, New York

New York State Route 25A
- NY 25A highlighted in red

Route information
- Auxiliary route of NY 25
- Maintained by NYSDOT and NYCDOT
- Length: 72.91 mi (117.34 km)
- Existed: c. 1927–present

Major junctions
- West end: I-495 Toll in Long Island City
- NY 25 in Long Island City; I-278 in Woodside; Grand Central Parkway / Whitestone Expressway in Corona; I-678 / Whitestone Expressway in Flushing; I-295 in Bayside; Cross Island Parkway in Bayside; NY 101 in Flower Hill; NY 107 in Brookville; NY 106 in East Norwich; NY 108 in Cold Spring Harbor; NY 110 in Huntington; Sunken Meadow State Parkway in Fort Salonga; NY 25 / NY 111 in Village of the Branch; CR 97 in Stony Brook; NY 112 in Port Jefferson Station; NY 347 in Mount Sinai
- East end: NY 25 in Calverton

Location
- Country: United States
- State: New York
- Counties: Queens, Nassau, Suffolk

Highway system
- New York Highways; Interstate; US; State; Reference; Parkways
← NY 25	→ NY 25B

New York State Route 25A (NY 25A) is a state highway on Long Island in New York, United States. It serves as the main east–west route for most of the North Shore of Long Island, running for 73 miles (117 km) from Interstate 495 (I-495) at the Queens–Midtown Tunnel in the New York City borough of Queens to NY 25 in Calverton, Suffolk County. The highway is a northern alternate route of NY 25, which follows a more inland routing along Jericho Turnpike.

The route is known for its scenic path through decidedly lesser-developed areas such as Brookville, Fort Salonga, Centerport, and Roslyn. It is known by various names along its routing, the most prominent of which include Northern Boulevard, North Hempstead Turnpike, Main Street, Fort Salonga Road, and North Country Road. It merges with NY 25 for approximately 1.5 miles (2.4 km) in Smithtown.

== Route description ==
=== Queens ===
NY 25A begins at I-495 exit 14, the second exit off the Long Island Expressway, in Long Island City in the New York City borough of Queens. The route initially heads northward, following 21st Street for three blocks before turning northeast onto Jackson Avenue. Here, NY 25A widens from two to four lanes, a width that the road retains well into Nassau County. The highway serves the Long Island City Courthouse on its way to a junction with Queens Boulevard (NY 25) at the foot of the Queensboro Bridge. Here, the road changes names again, becoming Northern Boulevard. Unlike the first two names, the Northern Boulevard name extends for a considerable distance, remaining with NY 25A through the neighborhoods of Long Island City, Woodside, Jackson Heights, Corona, East Elmhurst, Flushing, Bayside, Douglaston and Little Neck. Northern Boulevard is the starting point of several prominent streets, such as Springfield Boulevard, Steinway Street, Roosevelt Avenue and Woodside Avenue.

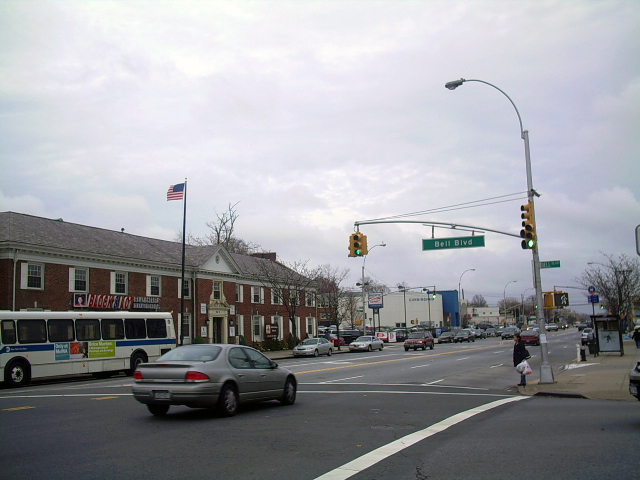
Junction of Northern (NY 25A) and Bell Boulevards in Bayside

As Northern Boulevard, NY 25A begins to follow a more easterly path, loosely paralleling the Sunnyside Yard to the south. NY 25A continues east into Woodside, and the Brooklyn–Queens Expressway (I-278) intersects with Northern Boulevard at the Woodside–Jackson Heights border. Northern Boulevard serves as the southern border for East Elmhurst from the Brooklyn-Queens Expressway to 114th Street. It also serves as the northern border for Jackson Heights and North Corona. NY 25A becomes a part of a large street grid and running along a linear alignment through Jackson Heights, East Elmhurst, and Corona. It eventually reaches Flushing Meadows-Corona Park, where the highway intersects with the Grand Central Parkway just northwest of Citi Field, where it briefly becomes a freeway whilst running parallel to the Whitestone Expressway. NY 25A then proceeds east as a surface road again to Flushing, where it intersects the Van Wyck Expressway (I-678).

Northern Boulevard continues through Flushing, where it was once known as Broadway, towards Bayside. The route travels generally easterly across Bayside, intersecting with the Clearview Expressway (I-295) along the way. Not far to the east, it crosses over the Cross Island Parkway at Alley Pond Park. Past the Cross Island Parkway, NY 25A goes through Douglaston and Little Neck before crossing the New York City line into Nassau County. The five-mile (8 km) stretch of Northern Boulevard stretching eastward from Flushing has been described as roughly coterminous with Koreatown, Queens.

=== Nassau County ===
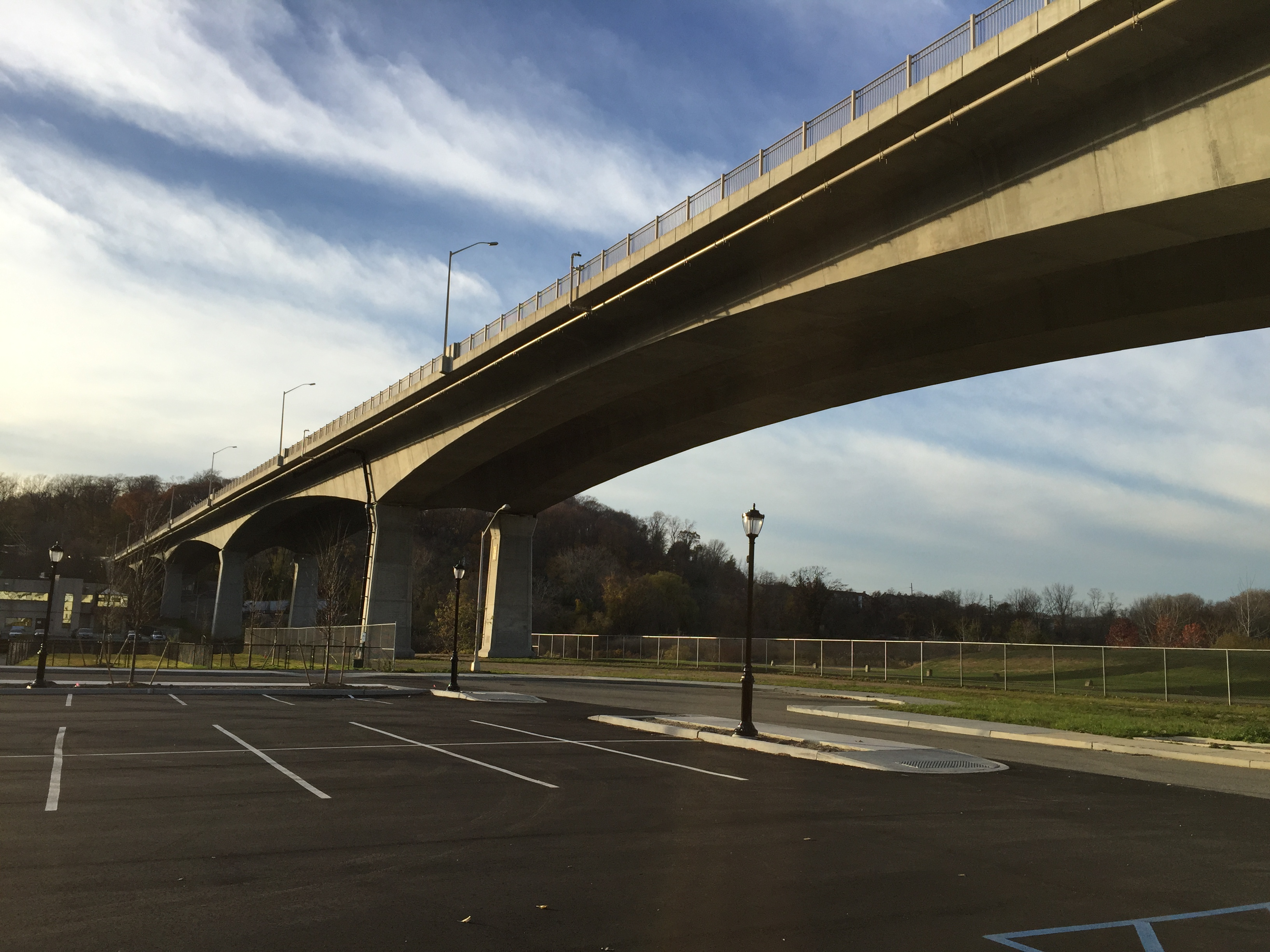
NY 25A crosses the southern tip of Hempstead Harbor on the Roslyn Viaduct

NY 25A, still bearing the Northern Boulevard name, crosses into Nassau County at the Great Neck hamlet known as University Gardens. It winds its way around a steep curve in the Great Neck area before descending into Manhasset and the hamlet's Miracle Mile shopping area. The route continues eastward, intersecting with NY 101 and Nassau County Route 101 (Port Washington Boulevard and Searingtown Road, respectively) just south of Port Washington, in the villages of Flower Hill (on its north side) and Roslyn Estates (on its south side), ahead of a split in Northern Boulevard. Old Northern Boulevard, which once carried the NY 25A designation, is the old route, which passes through the village of Roslyn, whilst Northern Boulevard itself bypasses the village via. the Roslyn Viaduct, which carries NY 25A over Hempstead Harbor. The old and new routes converge east of the viaduct at an interchange with Bryant Avenue, and Northern Boulevard heads northeastward through East Hills and Greenvale, where it intersects with Glen Cove Road. In Brookville, NY 25A passes the New York Institute of Technology and the C.W. Post Campus of Long Island University before intersecting with NY 107. Past this point, the route slowly curves back to the east ahead of a junction with NY 106 south of East Norwich. NY 25A's run as a four-lane road ends here, and the route becomes a simple two-lane country road. It briefly reverts to four lanes at Cold Spring Road, and the highway enters Suffolk County less than a mile (1.6 km) later.

Some discrepancy exists over NY 25A's street name in Nassau County, particularly regarding the eastern half of the county. While signage for Northern Boulevard exists as far east as Cold Spring Road, implying that Northern Boulevard extends from Queens to the Suffolk line, several businesses located between NY 107 and NY 106 give North Hempstead Turnpike as the highway's name. Additionally, an old, undated Hagstrom Map from the late 1940s indicates that the Turnpike name extends as far west as the Queens line.

=== Suffolk County ===
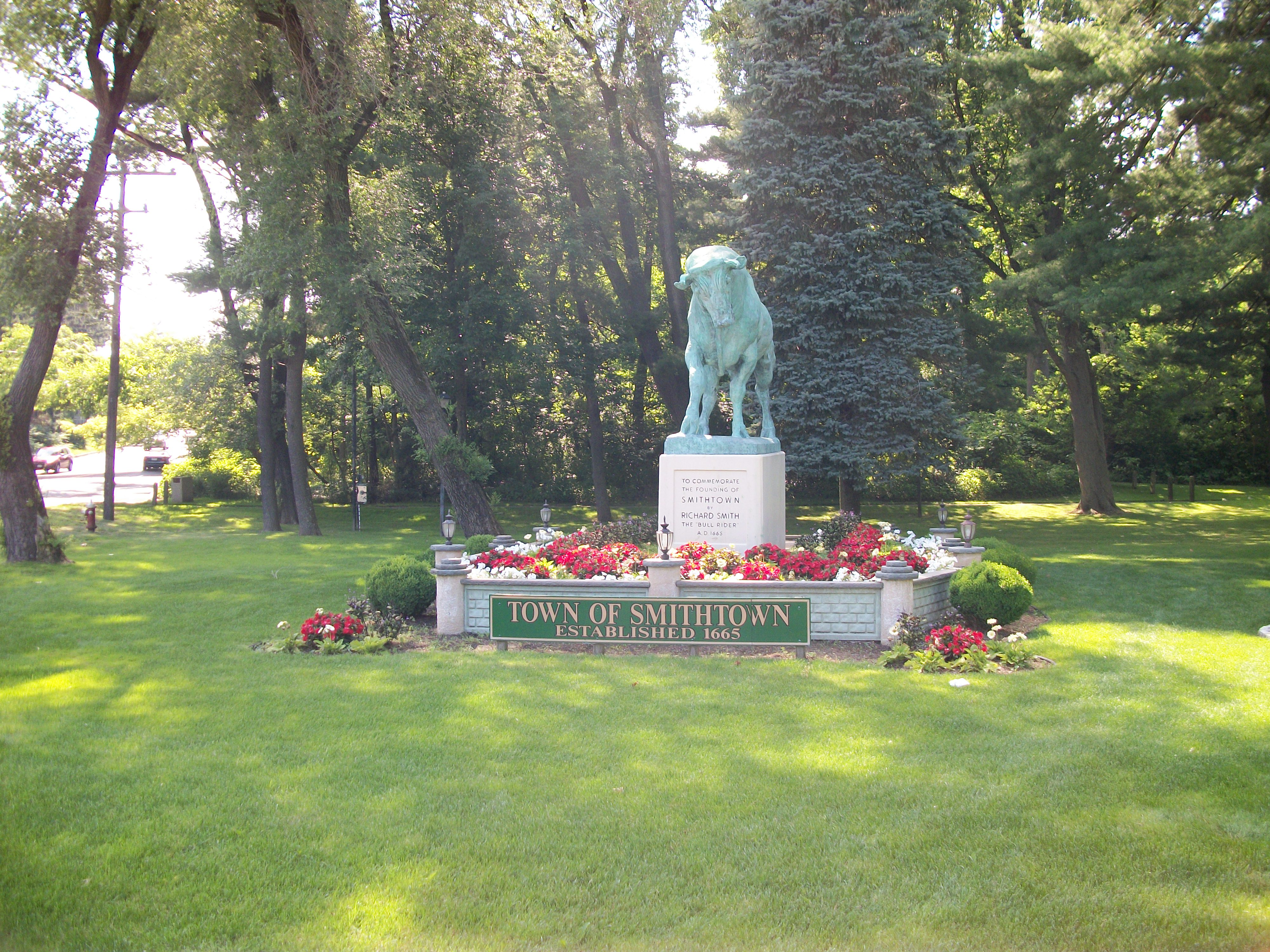
The Smithtown Bull, located at the west end of the overlap between NY 25 and NY 25A

NY 25A makes a sharp northward turn just inside the county line at an intersection with NY 108. It travels through Cold Spring Harbor, where it is initially called Harbor Road, and then West Main Street, before curving back to the east and heading into downtown Huntington. In the hamlet, the road widens to four lanes and is also known as Main Street east of Woodbury Road. At an intersection with County Route 35 (CR 35) on the east side of Huntington, NY 25A narrows to two lanes once more and becomes East Main Street, heading toward Centerport, where it becomes Fort Salonga Road. This name remains in place through Centerport, Northport and Fort Salonga to the vicinity of Sunken Meadow State Park. On the way to the park, NY 25A intersects the northern termini of CR 86, though it is unsigned, in Centerport, and CR 10 in Northport. Just south of the park, NY 25A intersects with its first limited-access highway since the Cross Island Parkway in Queens when it encounters the northernmost exit on the Sunken Meadow State Parkway.

Past the parkway, the route changes names from Fort Salonga Road to Main Street as it enters Kings Park, home to the now-closed Kings Park Psychiatric Center. The similarly numbered New York State Bicycle Route 25A (NY Bike Route 25A) joins NY 25A here, switching from CR 11 to NY 25A at the former's east end in the center of the hamlet. NY 25A continues on an eastward track to San Remo (just east of Kings Park), where it makes a sharp southward turn at an intersection with St. Johnland Road in the center of the community. The route takes on the St. Johnland Road name and loosely parallels the Nissequogue River as it heads toward Smithtown. They cross just west of the Village of the Branch at the Smithtown Bull, where NY 25A intersects with its parent route. NY Bike Route 25A ends here; however, NY 25A continues east into the hamlet of Smithtown by way of an overlap with NY 25 along Jericho Turnpike.

The Jericho Turnpike name ends a short distance into the community at a junction with Edgewood Avenue, giving way to Main Street. The Main Street name continues into the adjacent Village of the Branch, where NY 25 and NY 25A split at an intersection that also serves as the northern terminus of NY 111. The latter route heads to the South Shore of Long Island while NY 25 continues eastward and NY 25A heads northeast toward St. James and Stony Brook as North Country Road. This section of NY 25A runs along the Port Jefferson Branch of the Long Island Rail Road (LIRR) and is also mostly part of NY Bike Route 25, with occasional diversions. Along this stretch, NY 25A passes the Stony Brook Museum and Carriage House and Stony Brook University.

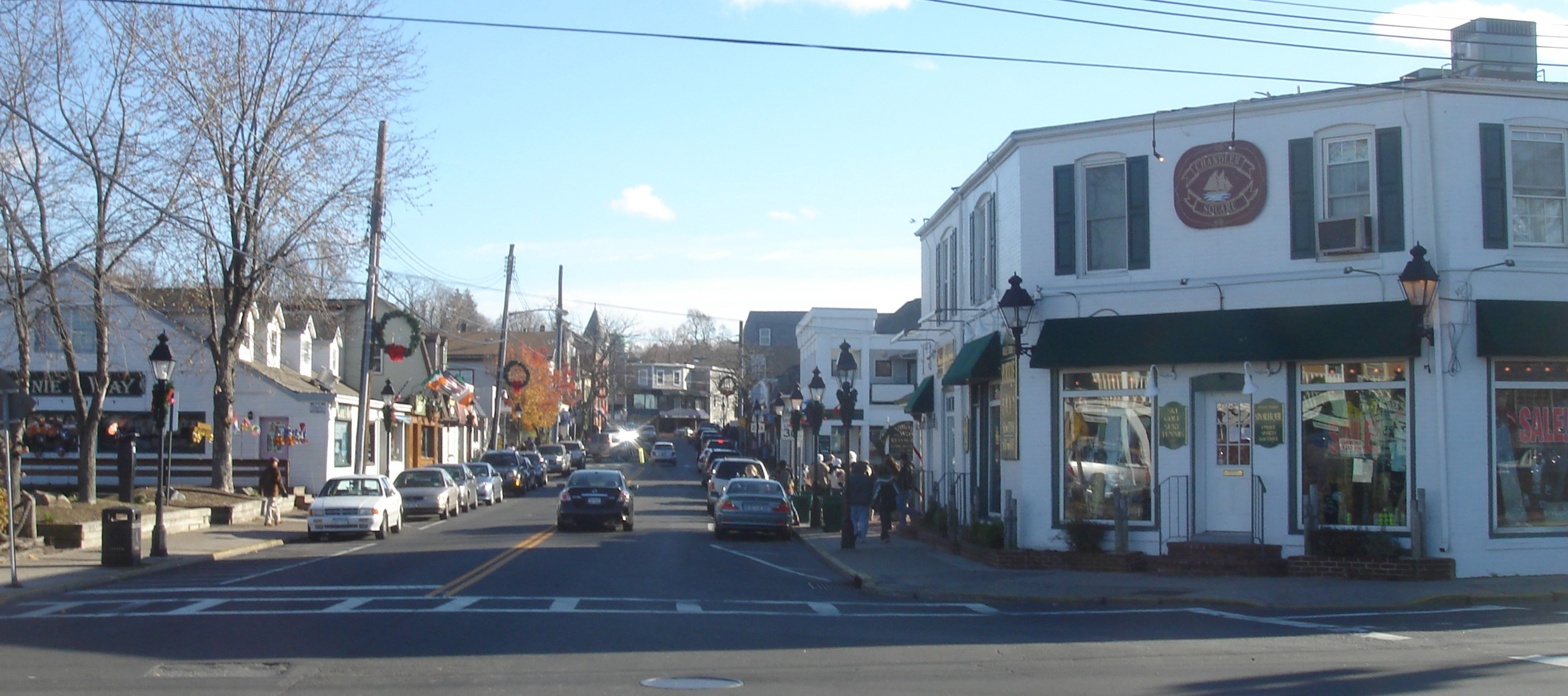
NY 25A turns south from West Broadway to Main Street in Port Jefferson

On the eastern edge of the Stony Brook campus, the route intersects with the north end of CR 97 (Nicolls Road). It continues on a generally northeasterly track to East Setauket, where it turns to head due east toward Port Jefferson. It enters the village as West Broadway, but turns south onto Main Street once the road reaches the harbor. NY 25A follows Main Street southeastward to Port Jefferson Station, home to the end of the LIRR's Port Jefferson Branch and NY 25A's junction with the north end of NY 112. At the latter, NY 25A makes a sharp turn to the east, heading through the hamlet on Hallock Avenue toward its intersection with NY 347 (Nesconset Highway). NY 347 ends here, and NY 25A briefly becomes a wider highway to match the width of the former road.

About 1 mile (1.6 km) from NY 347, NY 25A intersects with CR 83 (Patchogue–Mount Sinai Road). From here, the road passes through Mount Sinai and Miller Place before splitting again to bypass Rocky Point. The old path of the road passes through the community while NY 25A veers south of the hamlet. They reconnect east of Rocky Point to continue toward Shoreham and an intersection with CR 46 (William Floyd Parkway) near Brookhaven State Park. NY 25A continues east for another 3 miles (4.8 km) through Wading River to a fork in the road at Calverton National Cemetery, where the route veers southeast while Sound Avenue, the other leg of the fork, heads due east towards the North Fork of Long Island. NY 25A runs along the eastern edge of the cemetery and through part of the Brookhaven National Laboratory grounds before ending about 1.5 miles (2.4 km) from the split at a junction with NY 25 in Calverton.

== History ==
=== Origins ===
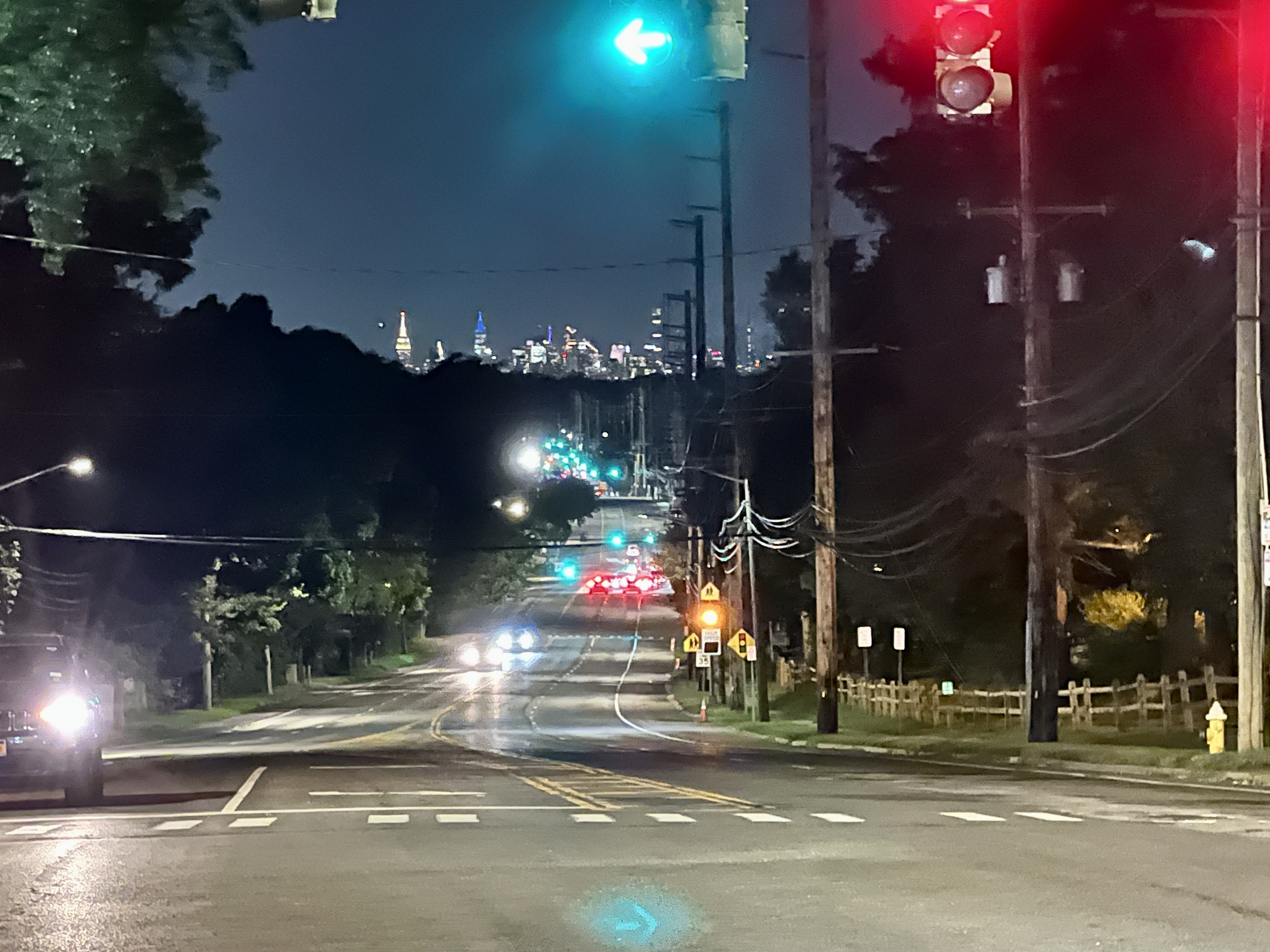
The New York City Skyline, seen from NY 25A in Manhasset

The route in Queens and Nassau County was originally an east–west Indian trail between the current town of North Hempstead and Flushing. Meanwhile, the original road in Suffolk County was realigned and straightened in several locations prior to becoming a state highway. The old route is now known as North Country Road from Port Jefferson Station to Sound Beach (formerly CR 20) and from Shoreham to Wading River. From Smithtown to Saint James, it is now Edgewood Avenue (itself once CR 87).

A handful of smaller, mostly local sections also exist. In Northport, the through road originally utilized Woodbine Avenue from Fort Salonga Road to Main Street and Bayview Avenue, and all of Main Street from there to Fort Salonga Road. In Setauket, it followed Main Street from Ridgeway Avenue and North Country Road to Old Town Road and current NY 25A. Finally, in Port Jefferson, the main road was initially East Broadway from Main Street and West Broadway to East Main Street, and East Main Street from there to the current Main Street.

=== Designation ===
All of modern NY 25A east of the New York City limits was originally designated as part of NY 25 in the mid-1920s. At the time, the section of Jericho Turnpike between New York City and Smithtown was state-maintained but unnumbered. It gained a designation c. 1927 when it was designated as NY 25A. By 1930, NY 25 was shifted southward onto its modern alignment between Smithtown and Riverhead while NY 25A was extended east over its former routing via Port Jefferson. In the 1930 renumbering of state highways in New York, the alignments of NY 25 and NY 25A west of Smithtown were flipped, placing NY 25 on Jericho Turnpike and NY 25A on the more northerly route via Roslyn and Huntington.

NY 25A was one of several routes that was extended west into New York City in mid-December 1934 when the city signed routes within its limits for the first time. The route followed Northern Boulevard west across northern Queens to Queens Boulevard, which at the time carried NY 24 and NY 25. Here, NY 25A joined NY 24 and NY 25 across the Queensboro Bridge into Manhattan, where it followed 2nd Avenue and 57th Street for five blocks to meet NY 22 and NY 100 at Park Avenue. The extension into Manhattan was eliminated by 1952 when NY 25A was truncated to the intersection of Northern and Queens Boulevards. In the 1960s, NY 25A was extended southwestward along Jackson Avenue to meet the Long Island Expressway (I-495) just east of where it enters the Queens–Midtown Tunnel.

The east end of NY 25A was reconfigured c. 1931 to follow Sound Avenue across the north shore of Long Island from Wading River to Mattituck, where it rejoined NY 25. The former routing of NY 25A between Sound Avenue and NY 25 west of Riverhead went unnumbered until the early 1940s when it was re-designated as NY 254. NY 25A was moved back onto its original routing through the town of Riverhead in the early 1950s, supplanting NY 254 in the process.

=== Former sections ===
NY 25A has been realigned in several locations in order to bypass local streets or entire communities along its routing.

==== Old Northern Boulevard (Flower Hill–Roslyn) ====
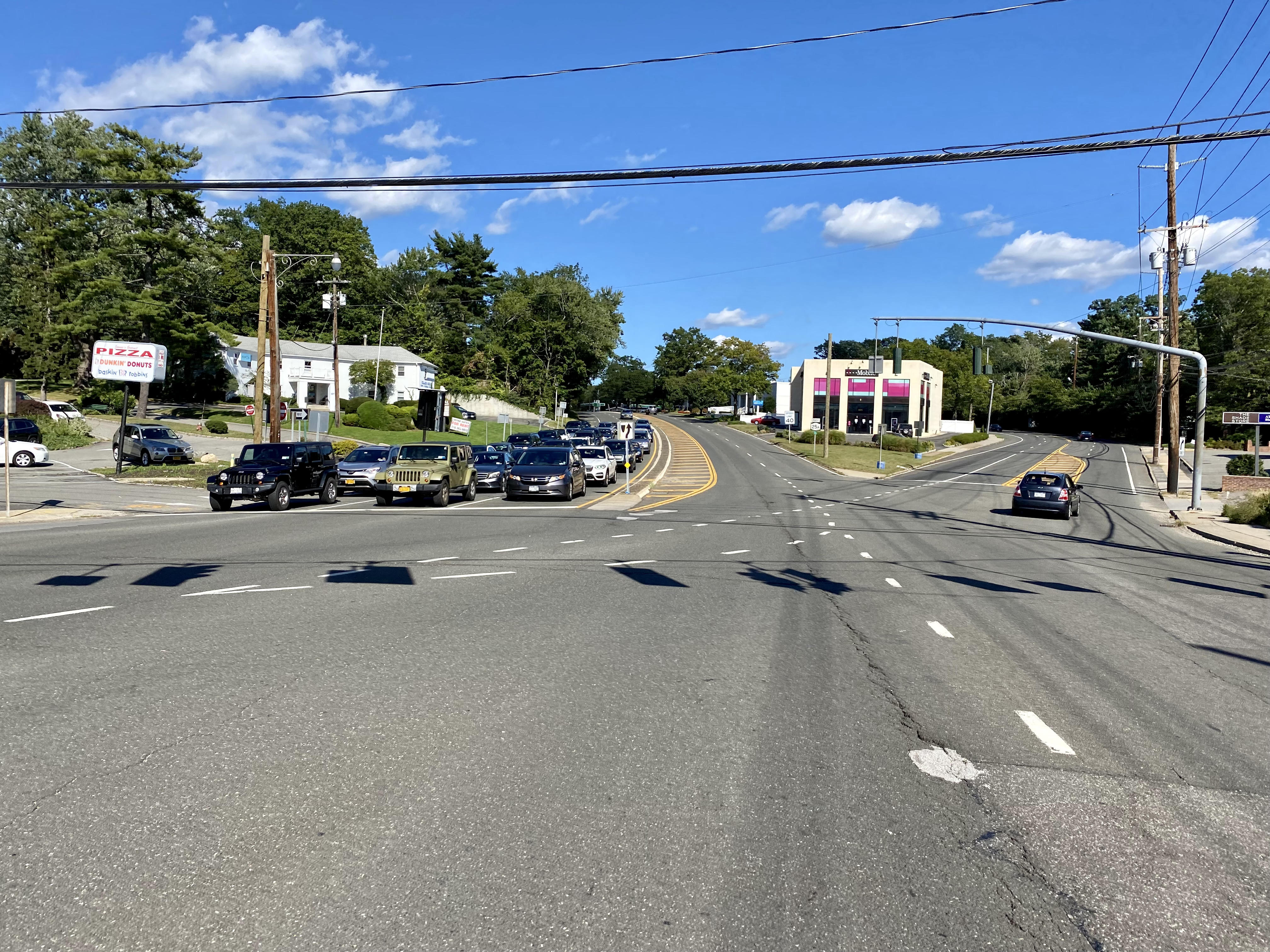
The old (right) and new (left) alignments of NY 25A at Middle Neck Road in Flower Hill, looking East

The construction of the Roslyn Viaduct in the 1940s, for example, enabled traffic to flow more freely over Hempstead Harbor and keeping the historic community to the south preserved intact. The new route, known as the Roslyn Cut-Off, opened in 1949, and it bypasses the old alignment, which travels through the heart of Roslyn's downtown area. The old route through this area is now known as Old Northern Boulevard, and is located within the Villages of Flower Hill, Roslyn, and Roslyn Estates. Much of Old Northern Boulevard within the downtown area of the Village of Roslyn is also part of its own historic district.

==== Other former sections ====
New York State Route 25A Business
- Location: Rocky Point

New York State Route 25A Bypass
- Location: Rocky Point

Several smaller sections also exist:

- Huntington: Old Northport Road between Woodruff Court and Huntington Crescent Club.
- Centerport: between Little Neck Road (former CR 86) and Centershore Road.
- Northport: between Troy Court and the driveway to Stonyhill Equestrian Center.
- Fort Salonga: Old Route 25A from east of Sunken Meadow Road to east of Tanyard Place.
- Smithtown: Realigned segment between John Street and Monroe Street, and again at the vicinity of Stone Gate Court.
- Setauket: North Country Road from Bennet's Road to Ridgeway Avenue and Main Street; Ridgeway Avenue from there to current NY 25A.
- Rocky Point: North Country Road from west of Rocky Point Landing Road to Woodville Road. The current alignment carries the designation NY 25A Bypass, with the former alignment designated as NY 25A Business.

=== Proposed bypasses ===
Several bypasses were planned for NY 25A by the New York State Department of Transportation. Only the Roslyn Viaduct and the Rocky Point Bypass were constructed; other attempts to realign the highway were cancelled as a result of public opposition. The projects were largely opposed out of fear that they would lower property values and bring more traffic jams and rampant development.

The proposed bypasses were:

- Manhasset Bypass (also known as the Miracle Mile Bypass): from East Shore Road to Manhasset Woods Road, crossing Whitney Pond and Shelter Rock Road. The proposal would have consisted of a four-lane or six-lane bypass south of the Miracle Mile, bypassing its western half, and would have cost approximately $5,000,000-$8,000,000 (1956 USD). Approximately 10 homes in the South Strathmore subdivision would have been acquired through eminent domain, and would have also taken portions of property from two churches as well as from the Munsey Park School (and closing off one of its major exits). It also would have severed one of the South Strathmore subdivision's major entrances/exits.

A similar proposal was made in 1968 when the Spinney Hill area near Whitney Pond was preparing to receive a slum clearance/urban renewal project. This proposal would have created a bypass between East Shore Road and Plandome Road.

- North Shore Expressway (Lloyd Harbor–Kings Park): from Syosset–Cold Spring Road to Main Street, running mostly along Pulaski Road (CR 11).
- Smithtown Bypass North (San Remo–Saint James): beginning at East Main Street, St. Johnland Road, and Rose Street, and ending somewhere in the vicinity of Edgewood Avenue (eastern intersection). Upon completion of this segment, NY 111 would have been extended to Saint James.
- Setauket–Port Jefferson Station Bypass: beginning between North Country Road and Ridgeway Drive, and ending at NY 112 at Hallock Avenue. Upon completion of this segment, New York 112 was to be extended along Main Street to the Port Jefferson–Bridgeport Ferry. Instead, much of the right-of-way was converted into a bicycle trail.
- Nugent Drive Extension: beginning at the intersection of NY 25A and Sound Avenue, it would have veered right before Hulse Landing Road (CR 54), then turned south to cross NY 25 east of its current terminus before finally reaching Edwards Avenue in Calverton north of the former railroad station. From there, it would have replaced Edwards Avenue and connected with the existing section southeast of exit 71 at the Long Island Expressway. Like the existing section of Nugent Drive, it was to be designated CR 94, and would have been concurrent with NY 25A from Wading River to CR 94A (Center Drive Spur), as well as NY 24. NY 25A would have ended at Main Street (NY 25) in Riverhead.

== Major intersections ==
County	Location	mi	km	Destinations	Notes
Queens	Long Island City	0.00	0.00	I-495 Toll west (Queens–Midtown Tunnel) – Manhattan	Western terminus; exit 14 on I-495
Queens	Long Island City	0.91	1.46	NY 25 (Queensboro Bridge / Queens Boulevard)	Queens Plaza
Queens	Jackson Heights	3.07	4.94	I-278 (Brooklyn-Queens Expressway) – RFK Bridge, LaGuardia Airport, Staten Island	Exit 41 on I-278
Queens	Corona	5.43	8.74	Grand Central Parkway east – Kennedy Airport, Eastern Long Island	No westbound exit; exits 9W-E on Grand Central Parkway
Queens	Corona			Astoria Boulevard west	Interchange; westbound exit and eastbound entrance
Queens	Corona			To I-678 (Van Wyck Expressway) – Whitestone Bridge, Kennedy Airport	Interchange; eastbound exit and westbound entrance; access via Whitestone Expy.
Queens	Flushing			Marina, Citi Field	Interchange; westbound exit and entrance; access via Marina Road
Queens	Flushing	6.28	10.11	I-678 south (Van Wyck Expressway) to Grand Central Parkway – Kennedy Airport, RFK Bridge, Eastern Long Island	Interchange; westbound exit and eastbound entrance; access to GCP via Whitestone Expy.
Queens	Bayside	9.95	16.01	I-295 (Clearview Expressway) to NY 25 (Hillside Avenue) – Throgs Neck Bridge	Exit 5 on I-295; former I-78
Queens	Douglaston	10.90	17.54	Cross Island Parkway – Whitestone Bridge, Bronx, Kennedy Airport	Exits 31E-W on Cross Island Parkway
Nassau	Munsey Park–Manhasset line	15.72	25.30	Manhasset Woods Road	
Nassau	Flower Hill–Munsey Park– Roslyn Estates tripoint	16.52	26.59	NY 101 north (Port Washington Boulevard) – Port Washington, Sands Point	Southern terminus of NY 101
Nassau	Flower Hill	17.05	27.44	Mineola Avenue / Center Drive	
Nassau	Roslyn	18.02	29.00	Bryant Avenue	Interchange
Nassau	Greenvale	20.62	33.18	To I-495 – Glen Cove, Hempstead	Access via Glen Cove Road
Nassau	Brookville–Old Brookville– Upper Brookville tripoint	21.18	34.09	NY 107 to I-495 – Hicksville, Glen Cove, Sea Cliff	
Nassau	East Norwich	24.37	39.22	NY 106 – Oyster Bay, Hicksville	
Nassau	Oyster Bay Cove	25.87	41.63	Berry Hill Road – Syosset	
Suffolk	Cold Spring Harbor	28.41	45.72	NY 108 south – Woodbury	Northern terminus of NY 108; access via Lawrence Hill Road
Suffolk	Community of Huntington	31.17	50.16	NY 110 (New York Avenue) – Halesite, Melville, Amityville	
Suffolk	Community of Huntington	31.71	51.03	CR 35 (Park Avenue)	
Suffolk	Huntington–Halesite line	32.24	51.89	Greenlawn Road (CR 9 east)	
Suffolk	Northport	35.94	57.84	CR 10 south (Elwood Road)	Northern terminus of CR 10
Suffolk	Fort Salonga–Kings Park line	41.15	66.22	Sunken Meadow State Parkway – South Shore, Sunken Meadow State Park	Exits SM5E-W (Sunken Meadow Parkway)
Suffolk	Kings Park	42.05	67.67	CR 11 west (Pulaski Road)	Eastern terminus of CR 11
Suffolk	Community of Smithtown	45.93	73.92	NY 25 west – Commack	Western terminus of concurrency with NY 25
Suffolk	Village of the Branch	47.28	76.09	NY 25 east / NY 111 south – Coram, Hauppauge	Eastern terminus of concurrency with NY 25
Suffolk	Stony Brook	52.28	84.14	CR 68 north (Main Street) – Historic Stony Brook	Western terminus of CR 68
Suffolk	Setauket–East Setauket line	53.74	86.49	CR 97 south (Nicolls Road) – Centereach, Blue Point, Stony Brook University	Northern terminus of CR 97
Suffolk	Setauket–East Setauket line	54.54	87.77	CR 68 west (Ridgeway Avenue) – Historic Stony Brook	Eastern terminus of CR 68
Suffolk	Port Jefferson Station	58.55	94.23	NY 112 south	Northern terminus of NY 112
Suffolk	Mount Sinai	59.65	96.00	NY 347 west	Eastern terminus of NY 347
Suffolk	Mount Sinai	60.75	97.77	CR 83 south to I-495 – Patchogue	Northern terminus of CR 83
Suffolk	Rocky Point	64.85	104.37	NY 25A Bus. east – Rocky Point Historic District	Former routing of NY 25A
Suffolk	Rocky Point	66.35	106.78	NY 25A Bus. west / Woodville Road	Former routing of NY 25A
Suffolk	East Shoreham	67.88	109.24	CR 46 south (William Floyd Parkway) to I-495 – Smith Point Park	Northern terminus of CR 46
Suffolk	Wading River	69.69	112.16	Wading River Manor Road – Wading River	Former CR 25
Suffolk	Wading River	70.69	113.76	North Country Road / Sound Avenue – Riverhead, Wildwood	Former routing of NY 25A
Suffolk	Wading River–Calverton line	72.91	117.34	NY 25 – Riverhead, Orient Point, New York	Eastern terminus
1.000 mi = 1.609 km; 1.000 km = 0.621 mi: Concurrency terminus; Electronic toll collection

== Transportation ==
Northern Boulevard and other parts of New York State Route 25A serve many bus routes, including the Nassau Inter-County Express and Suffolk County Transit. In Queens, the western portion spanning from Queens Plaza to Flushing is served primarly by the Q63 and Q66, whereas its eastern portion up to Little Neck is served by the Q12, alongside the Q13 between Sanford Avenue and Bell Boulevard and the Q28 up to Crocheron Avenue - all of which of these routes are operated by MTA Regional Bus Operations in New York City. A few primary Nassau-Inter County Express routes include the n20G and n20X, both of which run in Queens; but in Nassau, the n20G turns onto Lakeville Road to continue to Great Neck whereas the n20X continues straight up to Roslyn Clock Tower. The n20H continues east from Lakeville Road - north of the latter road - up until Cedar Drive, where it turns right to head to Hicksville.

== In popular culture ==
Northern Boulevard was mentioned in several episodes of Norman Lear's hit sitcoms All in the Family and Archie Bunker's Place – in addition to being the street on which several major locations in the show were located. Kelsey's Bar – the tavern which Archie Bunker frequented (and would eventually purchase and rename Archie Bunker's Place) – was one such location to be located on Northern Boulevard in the show. Another location was the first dry cleaning store opened by George Jefferson. The Bunker family's home at 704 Hauser Street – a fictitious street – was also said to be located off Northern Boulevard.
