= Nissequogue River =

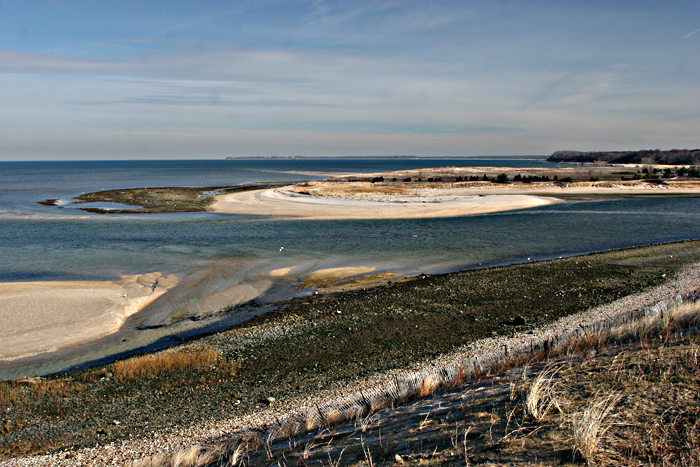
- Mouth on Long Island Sound

- Location within New York Location within the United States

Location
- Country: United States
- State: New York
- Region: Suffolk
- District: Smithtown

Physical characteristics
- Source: Caleb Smith Park (at northern end of New Mill Pond)
  - coordinates: 40.8428°N 73.2279°W
  - elevation: 29 ft (8.8 m)
- Mouth: Nissequogue River State Park at Long Island Sound
  - coordinates: 40.90426°N 73.23011°W
  - elevation: 0 ft (0 m)
- Length: 8.3 mi (13.4 km), SN
- Discharge
  - average: 42.2 cu ft/s (1.19 m^{3}/s)

The Nissequogue River is an 8.3-mile (13.4 km) long river flowing from Smithtown, New York into the Long Island Sound. Its average discharge of 42.2 cubic feet per second (1.19 m^{3}/s) is the most of any of the freshwater rivers on Long Island. The river, like all other freshwater rivers on the island, is totally derived from groundwater (not from lakes). Its name is derived from one of the Algonquian-speaking Nissequaq tribe in the area.

The river rises south of NY-454 just east of the Hauppauge County Offices and flows into Blydenburgh Park Pond where other tributaries that come from East Hauppauge and Commack meet and are dammed at Blydenburgh Pond. The river continues in a northeasterly direction, picking up additional tributaries from the north in Caleb Smith Park in Smithtown (where special regulation trout fishing is available). It is dammed once more before becoming an estuary at NY-25 where it then flows to Kings Park, New York, entering Long Island Sound at Nissequogue River State Park. Since much of the river is an estuary canoeists travel in both directions based on the tides.

Fish found in the river include Striped Bass, Bluefish, Summer Flounder, Winter Flounder, Porgies, Eels, Brown, Rainbow and Brook Trout, Yellow Perch, Largemouth Bass, Alewives, Herring, Shad, etc.

== List of crossings of the Nissequogue River ==
Crossings	Carries	Location	Coordinates
Unnamed road bridge	Landing Avenue	Smithtown	
Unnamed road bridge	NY 25 / NY 25A (Main Street)	Smithtown	
Old Main Street Bridge	Pedestrian Bridge	Smithtown	
Unnamed railroad bridge	Long Island Rail Road Port Jefferson Branch Trestle	Smithtown	
Unnamed road bridge	Mill Dam Road (Private)	Blydenberg County Park	
Unnamed road bridge	New Mill Road (Long Island Greenbelt Trail)	Blydenberg County Park	
Confluence with Northeast Branch at Mill Dam Pond		Blydenberg County Park	
Unnamed Road Bridge	Blydenberg County Park Driveway	Blydenberg County Park	
Unnamed road bridge	NY 454 (Veterans Memorial Highway)	Hauppauge	
Unnamed road Bridge	Raoul Wallenberg Drive (County Access Road)	Hauppauge	

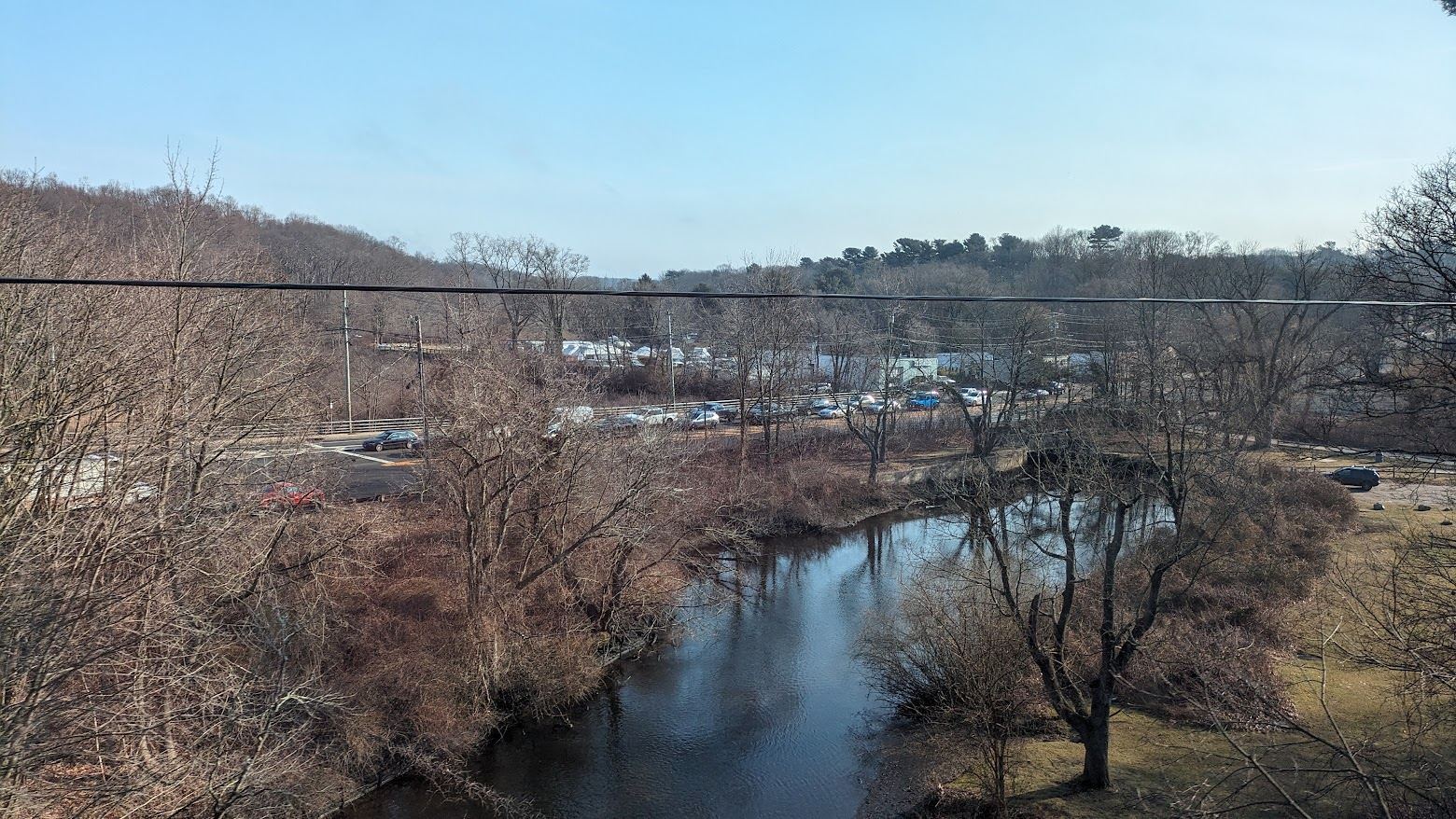
Nissequogue river seen from the LIRR bridge, looking towards NY 25/25A

=== Northeast Branch ===
Crossings	Carries	Location	Coordinates
Unnamed road bridge	Brooksite Drive	Smithtown	
Unnamed road bridge	CR 15 (Maple Avenue)	Smithtown	
Unnamed road bridge	NY 111 (Main Street)	Village of The Branch	
Unnamed road bridge	Terrace Lane	Village of The Branch	
Unnamed road bridge	Branch Drive	Village of The Branch	
Unnamed road bridge	NY 347 (Veterans Memorial Highway)	Hauppauge	
Unnamed road bridge	Bow Drive (Closed to motor vehicles)	Hauppauge	
Unnamed road Bridge	CR 67 (Town Line Road)	Hauppauge	
