= Nissequogue River State Park =

State park in Suffolk County, New York

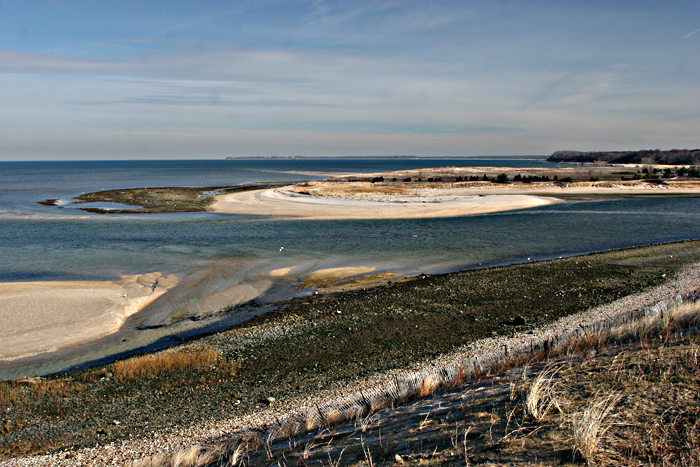
- The mouth of the Nissequogue River

- Location within New York
- Type: State park
- Location: 799 Saint Johnland Road; Kings Park, New York
- Nearest city: Kings Park, New York
- Coordinates: 40°53′52″N 73°13′53″W
- Area: 521 acres (2.11 km^{2})
- Created: 2000
- Operator: New York State Office of Parks, Recreation and Historic Preservation
- Visitors: 268,294 (in 2024)
- Open: Year Round
- Website: Nissequogue River State Park

Nissequogue River State Park is a 521-acre (2.11 km^{2}) state park located on the banks and bluffs of the Nissequogue River in Kings Park, New York. The park was opened in 2000, and established on the waterfront portion of the former Kings Park Psychiatric Center.

The name of the park was originally assigned to what is today the Caleb Smith State Park Preserve.

== History ==
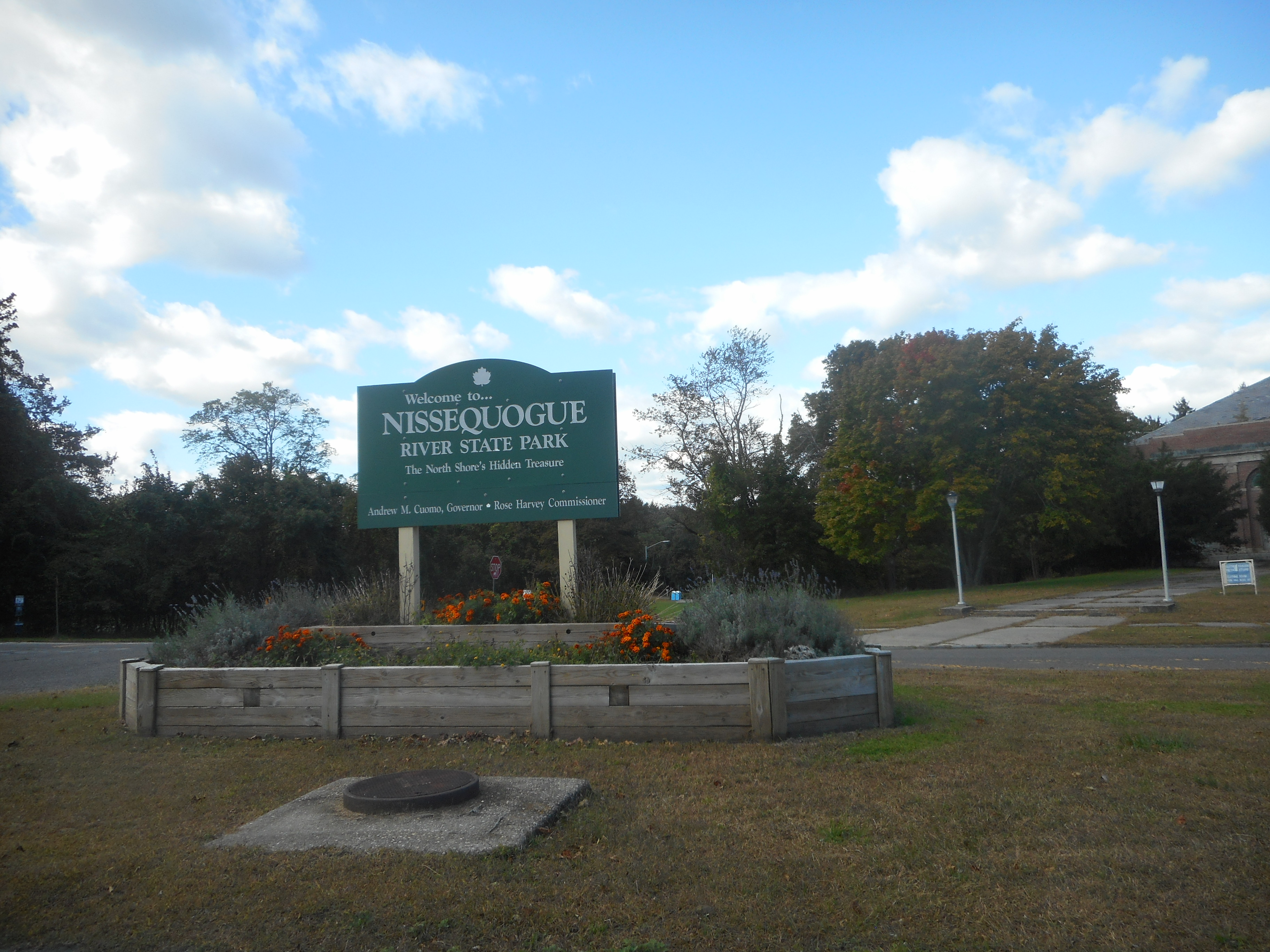
The north entrance at St. Johnland Road and Kings Park Boulevard.

Nissequogue River State Park was first established in 2000 on a 153-acre (0.62 km^{2}) portion of the former Kings Park Psychiatric Center property, which was closed in 1996. The remainder of the hospital's property remained available to development at that time.

In 2007, an additional 368 acres (1.49 km^{2}) of former hospital property were added to Nissequogue River State Park. At the time of the transfer, 90 acres (0.36 km^{2}) of the property that included the hospital's former buildings remained to be cleaned up and redeveloped, however plans called for development to be consistent with the surrounding parkland.

On May 17, 2010 New York State closed this park along with 55 other state parks due to budget cuts. However, the state reversed their decision on Nissequogue, and reopened the park on May 28, following passage of an $11 million deal in the state senate.

Demolition of 18 former hospital buildings, as well as the hospital's large smokestack, took place in 2013. A second round of demolitions was scheduled for 2016.

== Park description ==
Recreational opportunities at the park include soccer, bird watching, fishing, canoeing/kayaking, hiking, biking, and guided tours. The park also includes a marina with seasonal boat slips.

A bird conservation area has been established at the park, with the primary purpose of protecting overwintering locations for waterfowl and migratory birds. The conservation area particularly aims to protect feeding and roosting habitat for wading birds such as egrets and herons.

Several former Kings Park Psychiatric Center buildings remain standing in the park. Among those buildings that have been renovated is the former Veterans Administration Building (Building 125), which serves as the park office. Other notable buildings include York Hall (Building 80), the hospital's main auditorium and theater, which has been on the National Register of Historic Places since October 23, 2023. (#100009455)

== See also ==
- List of New York state parks
