= Blydenburgh Park Historic District =

Historic district in New Hampshire, United States

- U.S. National Register of Historic Places
- U.S. Historic district
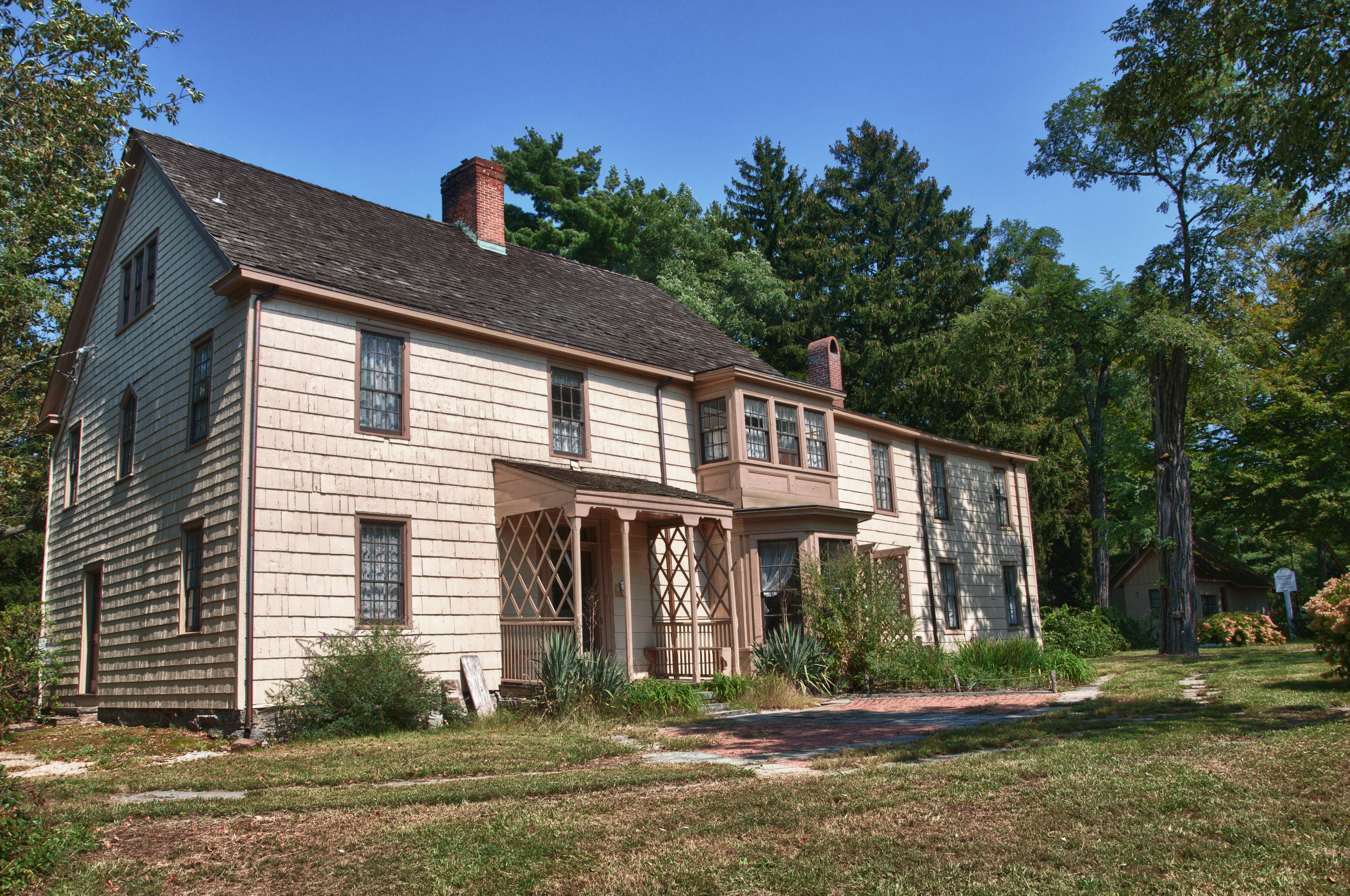
- Blydenburgh Weld Farmhouse, built in 1821

- Location within New York Location within the United States
- Location: Blydenburgh County Park, Smithtown, New York
- Coordinates: 40°50′36″N 73°13′34″W
- Area: 10 acres (4.0 ha)
- Architectural style: Federal, Gothic Revival
- NRHP reference No.: 83001807
- Added to NRHP: August 11, 1983

The Blydenburgh Park Historic District is a national historic district located within the Town of Smithtown, in Suffolk County, New York, United States.

== Description ==
The historic district includes eight contributing buildings and one contributing structure. There are two groups of historic buildings: the mill complex and Blydenburgh Farmhouse and related buildings.

It was added to the National Register of Historic Places in 1983.

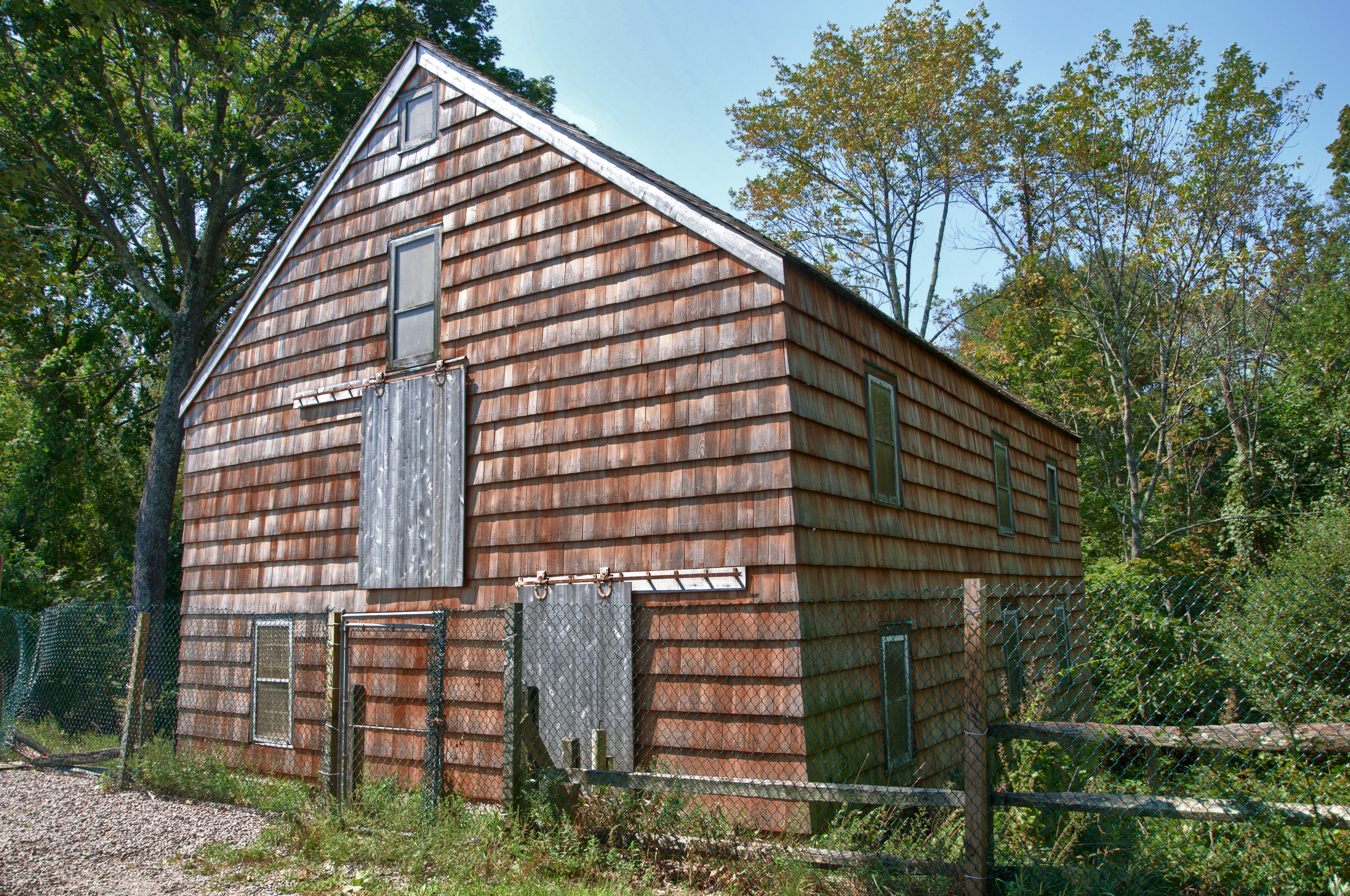
1798 Mill

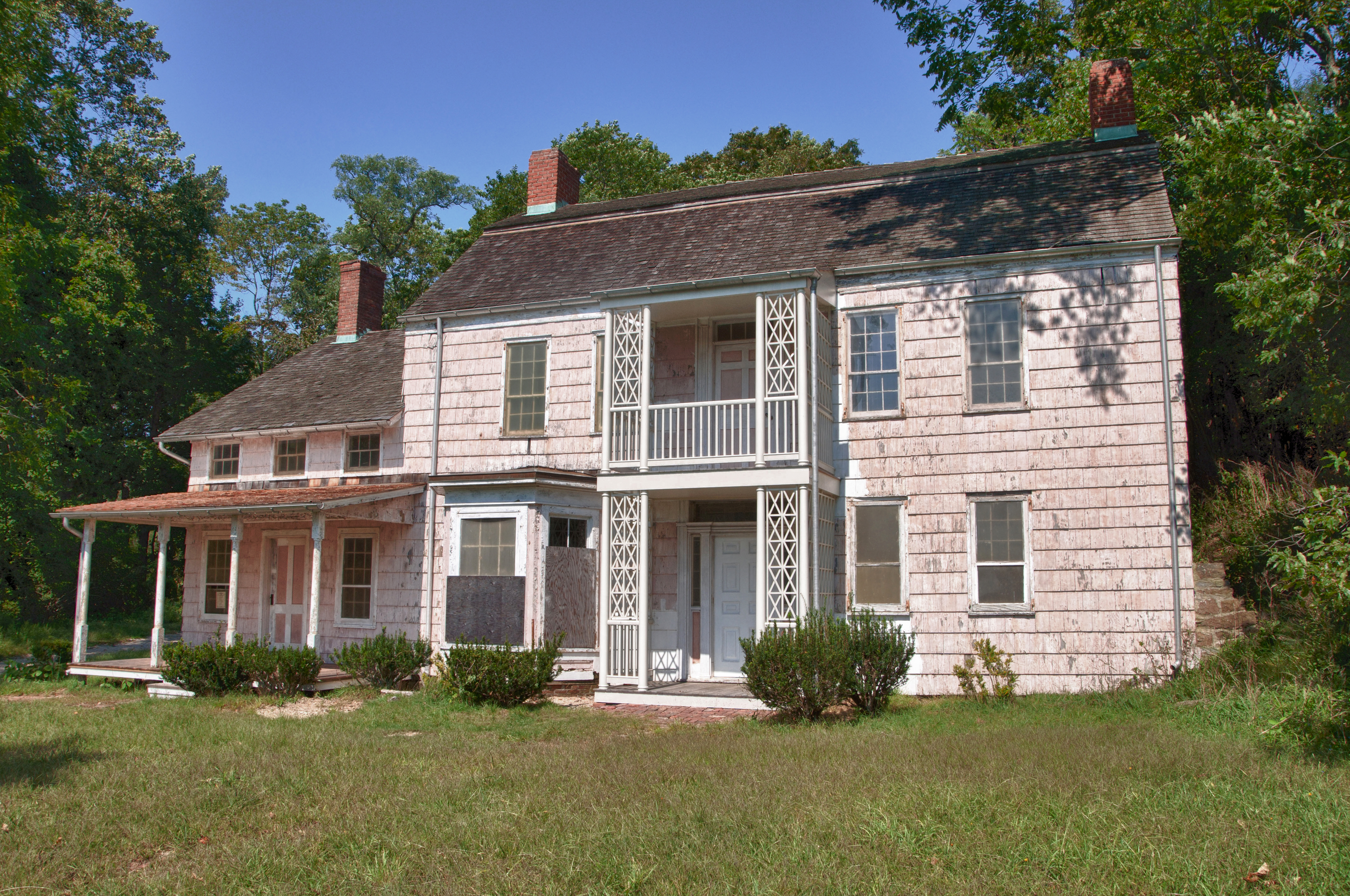
1802 Miller House

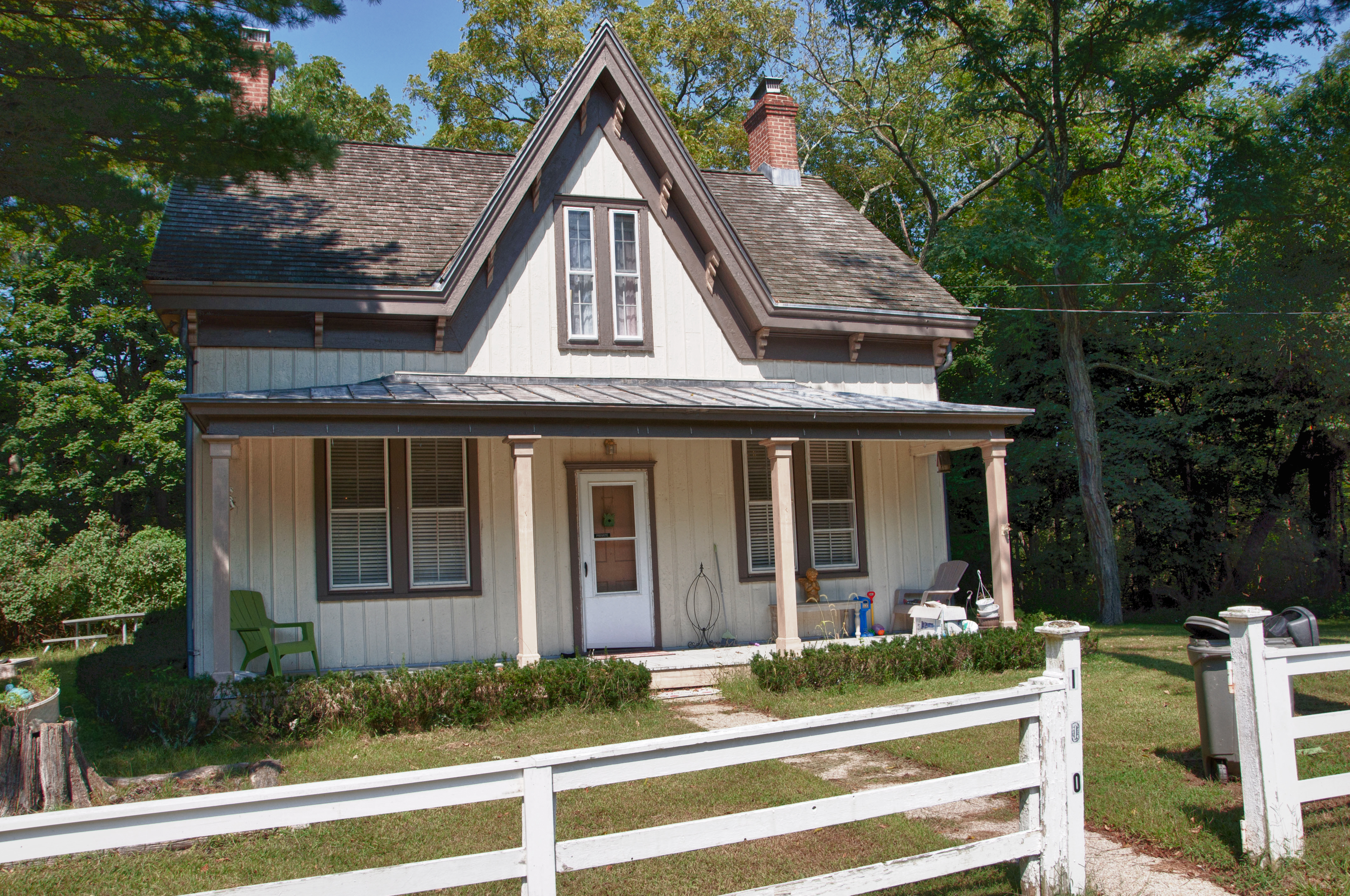
1860 Farm Cottage

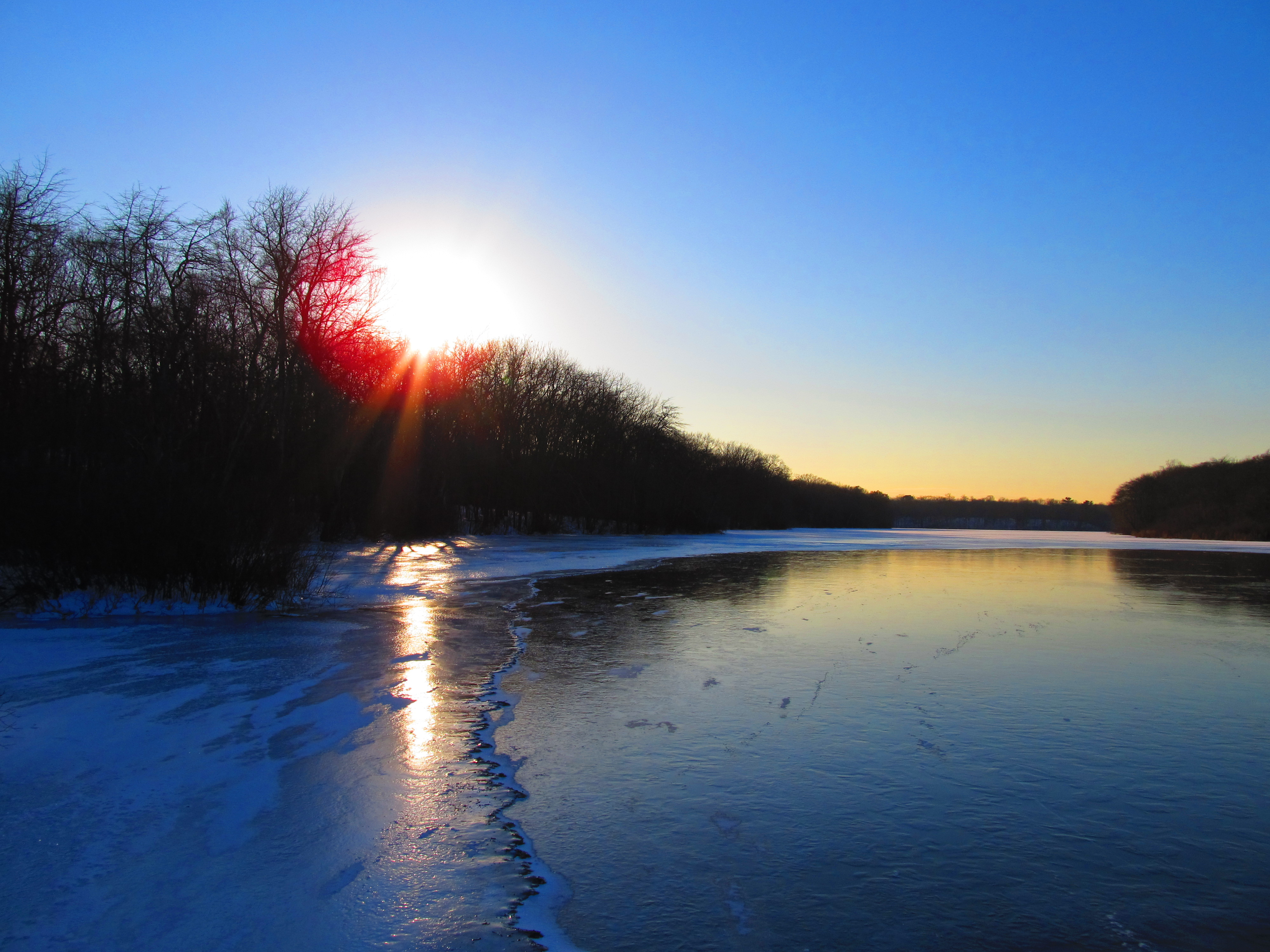
The frozen lake within Blydenburgh County Park

== See also ==
- Caleb Smith State Park
- Village of the Branch Historic District
