= Caleb Smith State Park Preserve =

- Wyandanch Club Historic District
- U.S. National Register of Historic Places
- U.S. Historic district
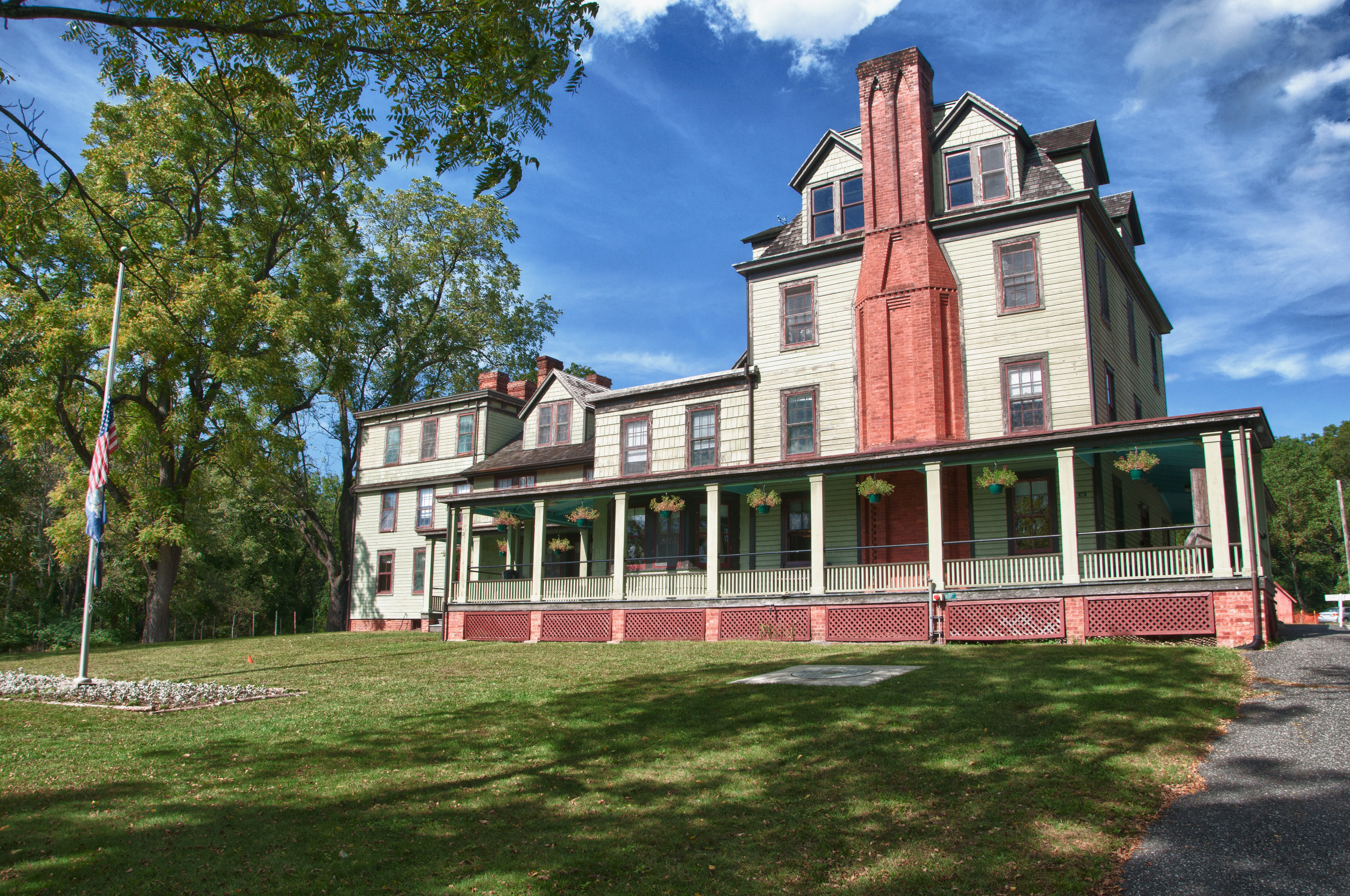
- Caleb Smith House

- Location within New York Location within the United States
- Location: Jericho Tnpk. SW of jct. with Meadow Rd., Smithtown, New York
- Coordinates: 40°51′3″N 73°13′40″W
- Built: 1751
- Architectural style: Colonial, Queen Anne
- Visitation: 100,916 (2024)
- NRHP reference No.: 90001143
- Added to NRHP: August 3, 1990

Caleb Smith State Park Preserve is a state park located in Suffolk County, New York in the United States. The park is near the north shore of Long Island in the town of Smithtown. Prior to its current name, the park was called Nissequogue River State Park, a name now used for park lands on the former Kings Park Psychiatric Center grounds. Previously, it was simply known as the Wyandanch Preserve.

== History ==
Originally part of the estate of Caleb Smith (1724–1800), the great grandson of Richard "Bull" Smith, the house was built in 1753 with his father Daniel Smith II. Although it has undergone many renovations, much of the original house still stands within the present building. The house was moved in either 1955 or 1958 to a plot of land behind the Smithtown Main Public Library in the Village of the Branch, New York.

Throughout the 19th century, the original house was expanded considerably. By 1888 it was bought by the Brooklyn Gun Club, and converted into a sportsman's hunting and fishing preserve. The property was named the "Wyandanch Club" in 1893. In 1963, it was acquired by the New York State Office of Parks, Recreation and Historic Preservation.

The Wyandanch Club Historic District was added to the National Register of Historic Places as a national historic district in 1990.

== Park description ==
The 548-acre (2.22 km^{2}) park is managed primarily as a nature preserve, and offers space for passive recreation such as hiking, fishing, and cross-country skiing. The park also offers recreation programs, a nature museum with wildlife displays, and a nature trail.

Two branches of the Nissequogue River pass through the park, which also includes the Wyandanch Club Historic District.

== Panorama ==
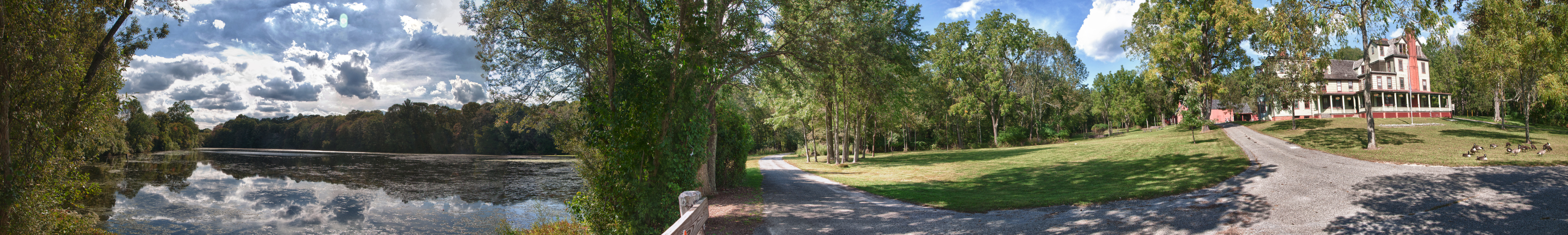
The Caleb Smith House and Lake.

== See also ==
- List of New York state parks
