= Kings Park, New York =

- Hamlet and census-designated place
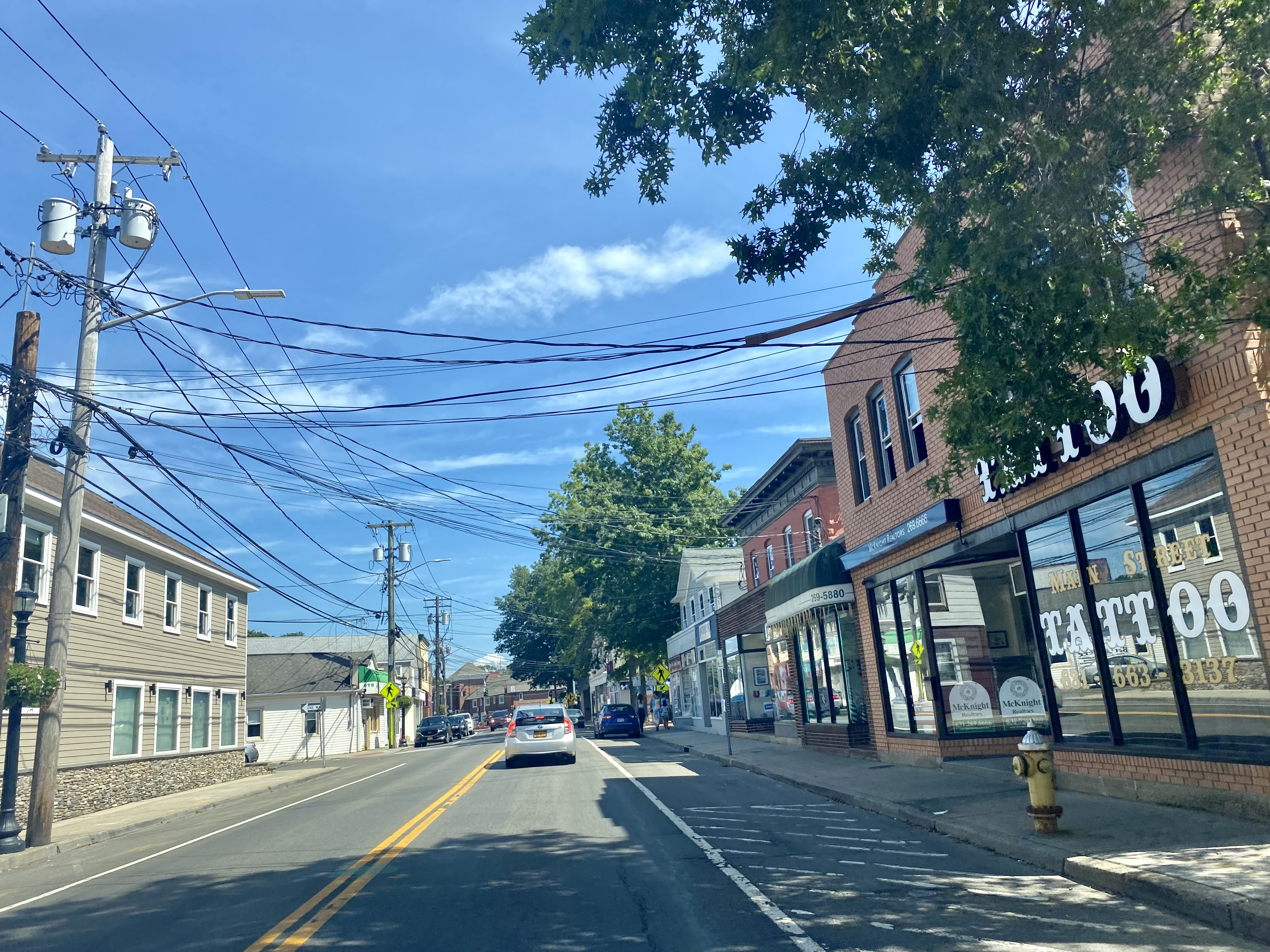
- Route 25A in Downtown Kings Park on August 15, 2021.

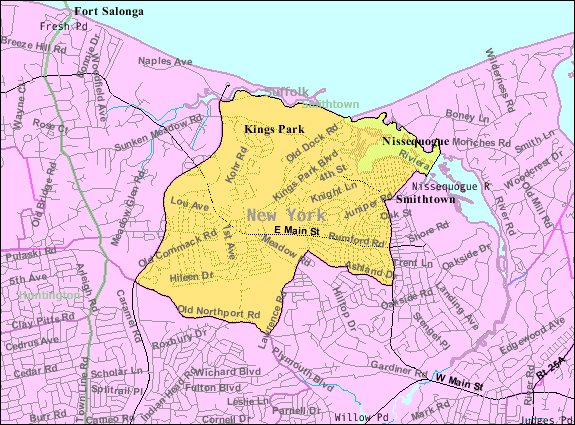
- U.S. Census map of Kings Park.

- Location within the state of New York.
- Coordinates: 40°53′19″N 73°14′33″W
- Country: United States
- State: New York
- County: Suffolk
- Town: Smithtown

Area
  - Total: 7.05 sq mi (18.25 km^{2})
  - Land: 6.67 sq mi (17.28 km^{2})
  - Water: 0.37 sq mi (0.97 km^{2})
- Elevation: 174 ft (53 m)

Population (2020)
  - Total: 17,085
  - Density: 2,560.8/sq mi (988.74/km^{2})
- Time zone: UTC-5 (Eastern (EST))
  - Summer (DST): UTC-4 (EDT)
- ZIP code: 11754
- Area codes: 631, 934
- FIPS code: 36-39672
- GNIS feature ID: 0954667

Kings Park is a hamlet and census-designated place (CDP) in the Town of Smithtown, in Suffolk County, in Long Island, in New York, United States. The population was 17,085 as of the 2020 census.

== Geography ==
According to the United States Census Bureau, the CDP has a total area of 6.6 square miles (17.1 km^{2}), of which 6.2 square miles (16.1 km^{2}) is land and 0.39 square miles (1.0 km^{2}), or 5.93%, is water.

Kings Park is bordered by Nissequogue to its east across the Nissequogue River, by Fort Salonga to its west, by Commack to its southwest, and by the hamlet of Smithtown to its southeast.

The CDP also includes part of the hamlet of San Remo. Located on the Northeastern part of the hamlet

== Demographics ==
Historical population
Census	Pop.	Note	%±
2020	17,085		—
U.S. Decennial Census

=== 2020 census ===
As of the 2020 census, Kings Park had a population of 17,085. The median age was 47.4 years. 18.5% of residents were under the age of 18 and 21.2% of residents were 65 years of age or older. For every 100 females there were 93.6 males, and for every 100 females age 18 and over there were 91.4 males age 18 and over.

99.9% of residents lived in urban areas, while 0.1% lived in rural areas.

There were 6,311 households in Kings Park, of which 28.1% had children under the age of 18 living in them. Of all households, 56.4% were married-couple households, 15.0% were households with a male householder and no spouse or partner present, and 24.5% were households with a female householder and no spouse or partner present. About 24.7% of all households were made up of individuals and 14.4% had someone living alone who was 65 years of age or older.

There were 6,564 housing units, of which 3.9% were vacant. The homeowner vacancy rate was 1.0% and the rental vacancy rate was 4.3%.

Racial composition as of the 2020 census
Race	Number	Percent
White	14,886	87.1%
Black or African American	196	1.1%
American Indian and Alaska Native	18	0.1%
Asian	559	3.3%
Native Hawaiian and Other Pacific Islander	0	0.0%
Some other race	342	2.0%
Two or more races	1,084	6.3%
Hispanic or Latino (of any race)	1,414	8.3%

=== 2010 census ===
As of the census of 2010, there were 17,282 people and 6,212 households residing in the CDP. The population density was 2,787.4 inhabitants per square mile (1,076.2/km^{2}). There were 6,469 housing units at an average density of 1,043.4 per square mile (402.9/km^{2}). The racial makeup of the CDP was 80.1% White, 5.1% African American, 0.1% Native American, 8.4% Asian, 0.02% Pacific Islander, 4.9% some other race, and 1.3% from two or more races. Hispanic or Latino of any race were 16.3% of the population.

There were 6,212 households in 2010, out of which 34.6% had children under the age of 18 living with them, 60.2% were headed by married couples living together, 9.4% had a female householder with no husband present, and 27.1% were non-families. 23.3% of all households were made up of individuals, and 12.1% were someone living alone who was 65 years of age or older. The average household size was 2.71, and the average family size was 3.24.

In the CDP, the population was spread out, with 23.3% under the age of 18, 6.6% from 18 to 24, 23.4% from 25 to 44, 29.4% from 45 to 64, and 17.2% who were 65 years of age or older. The median age was 43.3 years. For every 100 females, there were 93.7 males. For every 100 females age 18 and over, there were 90.8 males.

=== Income and poverty ===
Over the period 2007-2011, the median annual income for a household in the CDP was $92,921, and the median income for a family was $106,128. Males had a median income of $78,882 versus $55,872 for females. The per capita income for the CDP was $37,980. About 1.6% of families and 3.3% of the population were below the poverty line, including 2.6% of those under age 18 and 6.3% of those age 65 or over.

== Education ==
The Kings Park Central School District serves the majority of Kings Park, however, a small portion in the south part of the hamlet is located in the Smithtown Central School District

Kings Park High School is located in Kings Park on Main Street.

== Landmarks ==
Sunken Meadow State Park borders Long Island Sound and is accessible by the Sunken Meadow State Parkway. It is a part of the New York State Parks system. In addition to the water, the park has 6 miles (10 km) of public trails and 27 holes of golf. The park's facilities are used for different activities, among them various distance running competitions. "Cardiac Hill" is well known by local runners.

The Nissequogue River, 6 miles (10 km) in length, empties into Long Island Sound and is used for different types of water activities. The river flows through the Nissequogue River State Park.

Kings Park Bluff, sandwiched between Sunken Meadow State Park and Short Beach in Smithtown sits the Kings Park Bluff which empties into the Long Island Sound. Used as a boat launch and a popular fishing location for locals.

Kings Park is home to Leo P. Ostebo Kings Park Heritage Museum, the only school community managed town heritage museum in the United States, which is located in the first school building built in 1928.

== Fire Protection ==
Kings Park is protected by the Kings Park Fire Department, the station is located on East Main Street in Kings Park.

== Film ==
Leave the World Behind, a 2023 film starring Julia Roberts, Ethan Hawke and Mahershala Ali, was filmed in part at Kings Park on Long Island, New York, particularly at Sunken Meadow State Park. The park provided a scenic beach scene and fitting backdrop for the film's storyline, where the boat crashes on the shore. There was also a scene filmed on Main Street, a street in Kings Park.

== Notable people ==
- Percy Crosby (1891–1964) – Cartoonist who notably made the news paper sketch Skippy
- Robert W. Greene (1929–2008) – Investigative reporter and Pulitzer Prize winner
- Craig Biggio (born 1965) – Professional and Hall of Fame MLB player. Biggio graduated from Kings Park High School. He holds the National League record for most times leading off a game with a home run (53), and is one of only five players with 250 home runs and 400 steals. A four-time Gold Glove Award winner who led NL second basemen in assists six times and putouts five times, he retired ranking fourth in NL history in games at second base (1,989), sixth in assists (5,448) and fielding percentage (.984), seventh in putouts (3,992) and double plays (1,153), and eighth in total chances (9,596). He was the ninth player in the 3,000 hit club to collect all his hits with one team
- John Petrucci (born 1967) – guitarist, Dream Theater
- John Myung (born 1967) – bassist, Dream Theater
- Kevin Moore (born 1967) – keyboardist, Dream Theater
- Chris Koepplin (born 1985) – NFL placekicker
