= Kings Park Psychiatric Center =

Former psychiatric hospital in New York, United States

Coordinates: 40°53′38″N 73°14′30″W

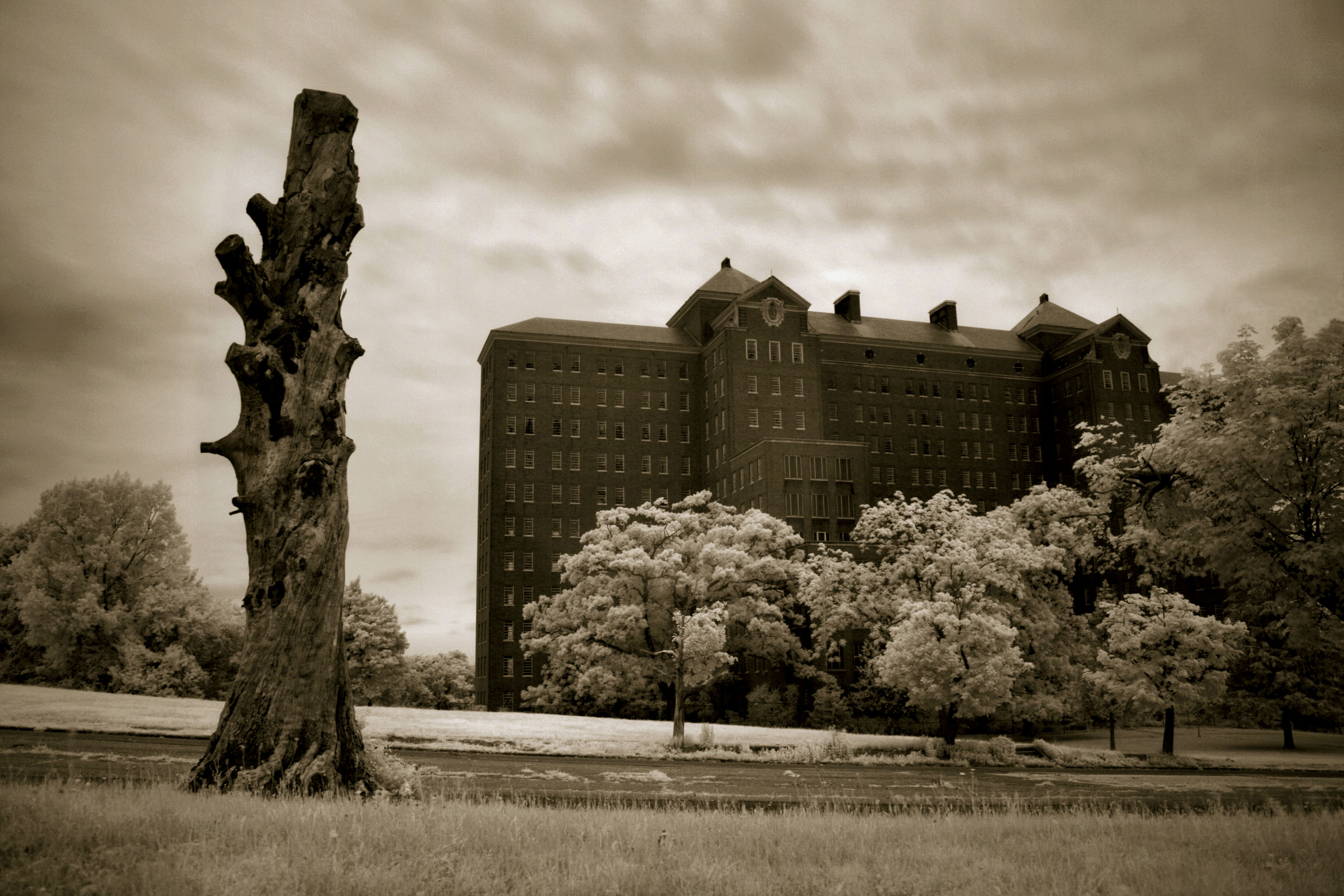
Kings Park Building 93

The Kings Park Psychiatric Center, known by Kings Park locals as The Psych Center, is a former state-run psychiatric hospital located in Kings Park, New York. It operated from 1885 until 1996, when the State of New York closed the facility, releasing its few remaining patients or transferring them to the still-operational Pilgrim Psychiatric Center.

== History ==
The Kings Park Psychiatric Center was established in 1885 by Kings County in nearby Suffolk County, adjoining the Society of St. Johnland established by William Augustus Muhlenberg, prior to the consolidation of Kings County with Queens, Manhattan, Staten Island and the Bronx, to form modern New York City. The official name of the hospital in its first 10 years was the Kings County Asylum, taken from the name of the county that Brooklyn occupied. The hospital was revolutionary at the time in the sense that it was a departure from the asylums of folklore, which were overcrowded places where gross human rights abuses often occurred. The asylum, built by Brooklyn to alleviate overcrowding in its own asylums, was a "farm colony" asylum, where patients worked in a variety of farm-related activities, such as feeding livestock and growing food, as this was considered to be a form of therapy.

Eventually, the Kings County Asylum began to suffer from the very thing that it attempted to relieve—overcrowding. New York State responded to the problem in 1895, when control of the asylum passed into state hands, and it was renamed the Kings Park State Hospital. The surrounding community, which used to be known as Indian Head, adopted the name "Kings Park," by which it is still known today. The state eventually built the hospital into a self-sufficient community that not only grew its own food, but also generated its own heat and electricity, had its own Long Island Rail Road spur and housed its staff on-site.

As patient populations grew throughout the early part of the 20th century, the hospital continued to expand. By the late 1930s, the state began to build upward instead of outward. During this period, the famous 13-story Building 93 was constructed. Designed by state architect William E. Haugaard and funded with Works Progress Administration money, the building, often dubbed "the most famous asylum building on Long Island," was completed in 1939. It was used as an infirmary for the facility's geriatric patients, as well as for patients with chronic physical ailments.

After World War II, patient populations at Kings Park and the other Long Island asylums increased markedly. In 1954, the patient census at Kings Park topped 9,303, but would begin a steady decline afterward. By the time Kings Park reached its peak patient population, the old "rest and relaxation" philosophy surrounding farming had been succeeded by more invasive techniques of pre-frontal lobotomies and electroshock therapy. However, those methods were soon abandoned after 1955, following the introduction of Thorazine, the first widely used drug in the treatment of mental illness. As medication made it possible for patients to live normal lives outside of a mental institution, the need for large facilities such as Kings Park diminished, and the patient population began to decrease. In addition, activists worked in legal suits through the 1970s to reduce the patient population in major institutions, arguing that people could better be supported in smaller community centers.

By the early 1990s, the Kings Park Psychiatric Center, as it came to be known, was much reduced. Many of the buildings were shut down or reduced in usage. This included the massive Building 93. By the early 1990s, only the first few floors of the building were in use. While many patients were de-institutionalized and large facilities were closed, there was a shortage of small community centers, which were never developed in the number needed. This resulted in many more mentally ill people being caught up and retained in jails and prisons because of difficulties in dealing with the world. Many of the homeless in urban areas are mentally ill, people with chronic illnesses who have difficulty keeping up with medication regimes or resist them.

In response to the declining patient population, the New York State Office of Mental Health developed plans to close Kings Park as well as another Long Island asylum, the Central Islip Psychiatric Center, in the early 1990s. The plans called for Kings Park and Central Islip to close, and the remaining patients from both facilities to be transferred to the still-operational Pilgrim Psychiatric Center, or be discharged. In the fall of 1996, the plans were implemented. The few remaining patients from Kings Park and Central Islip were transferred to Pilgrim, ending Kings Park's 111-year run.

== Facilities ==
The hospital campus contained over 100 buildings, some of which were organized into groups that functioned together. The remaining buildings are listed below:

=== Main buildings ===
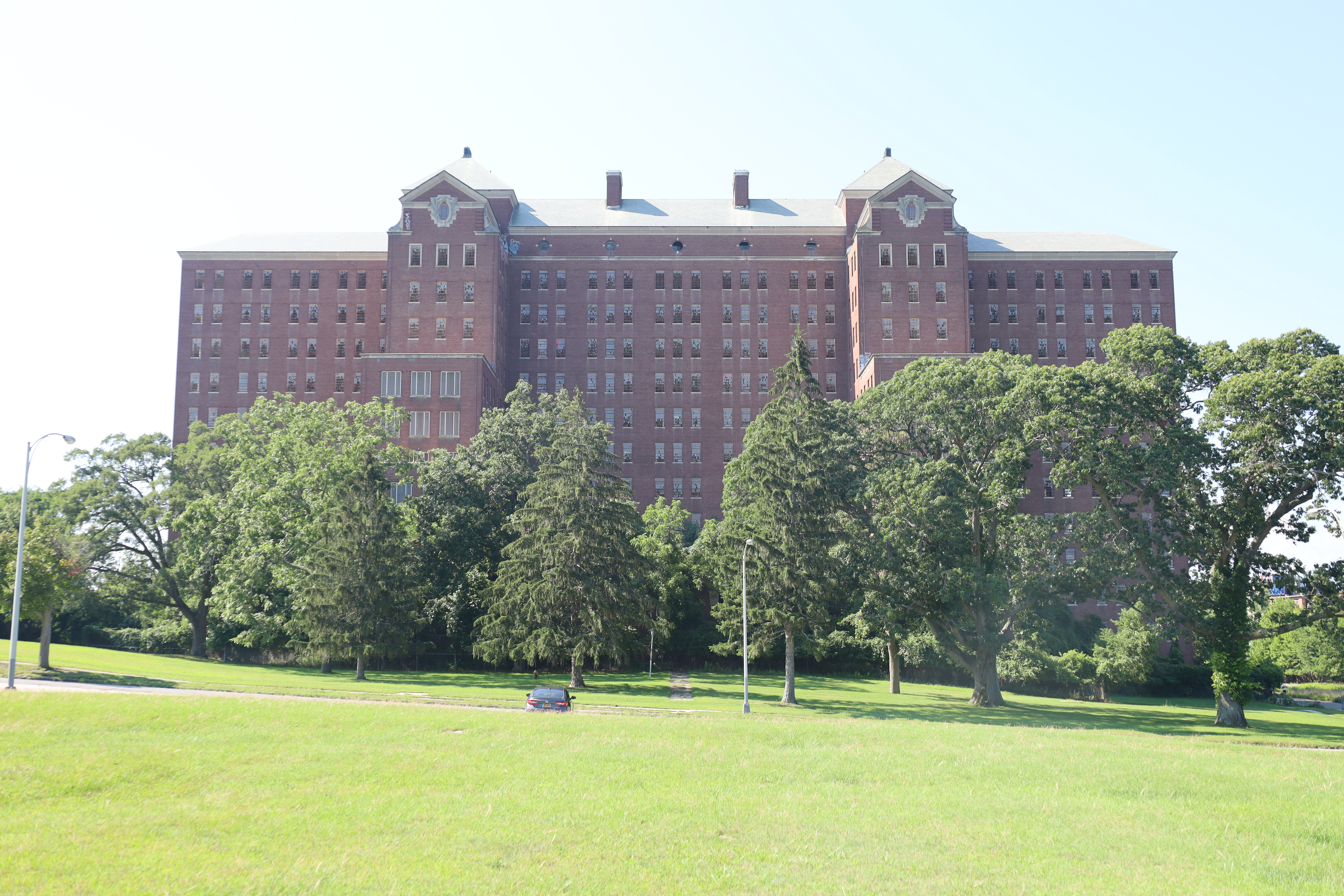
Building 93

- Building 93, a 13-story neoclassic building constructed in 1939 and used for patient housing. Beginning in the 1970s, the upper floors began to close until only the first four floors of the building were in use by the time it closed completely in 1992, with utilities to the building shut off in 1993.

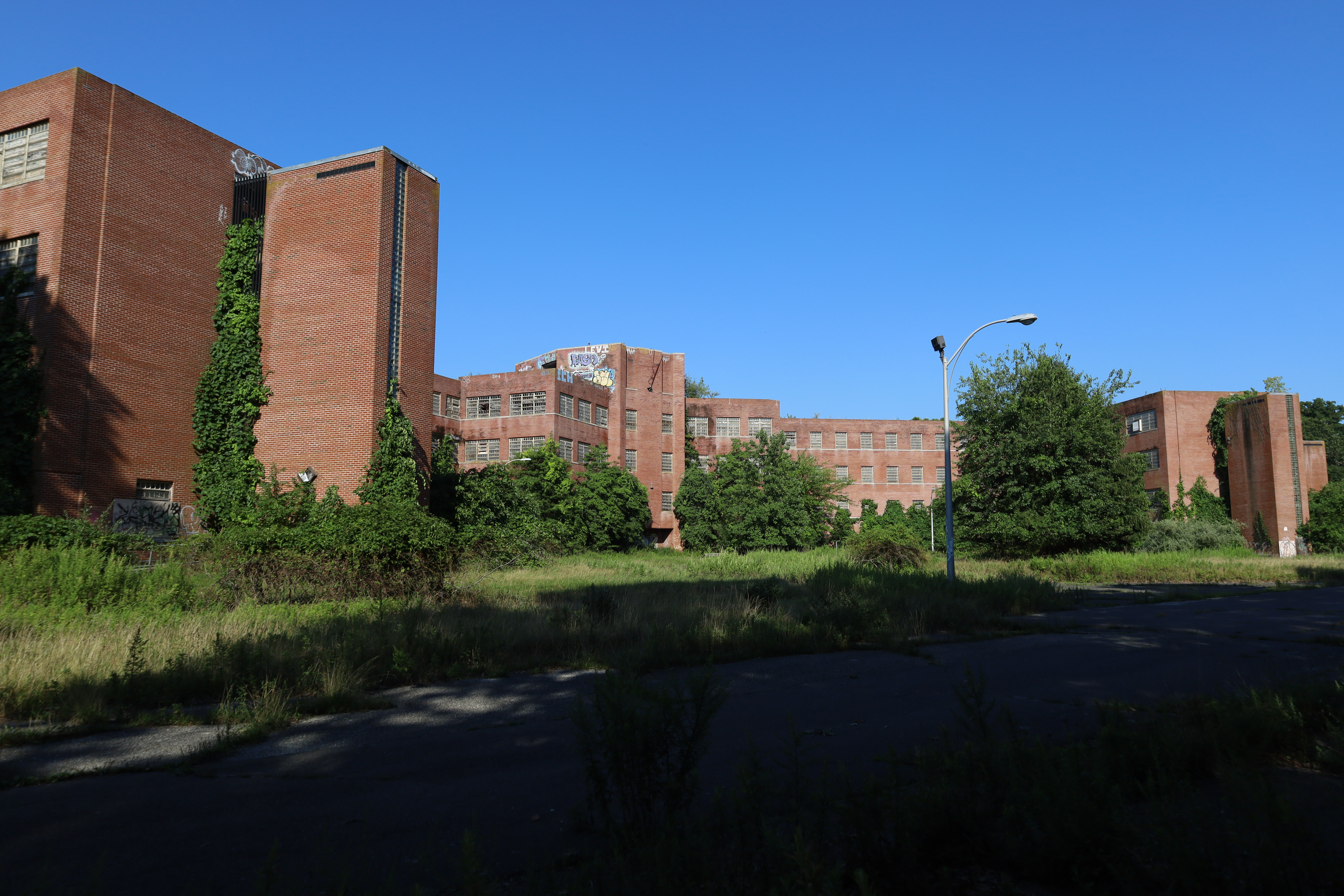
Building 21

- Buildings 21 and 22, two identical connected four-story buildings. Construction began in 1957 and was completed in 1966. Building 21 was used for patient housing, while Building 22 was used for hospital admissions. By 1993, the hospital's operations had moved to Buildings 7, 21, and 22. The building closed in 1996, along with Building 7.

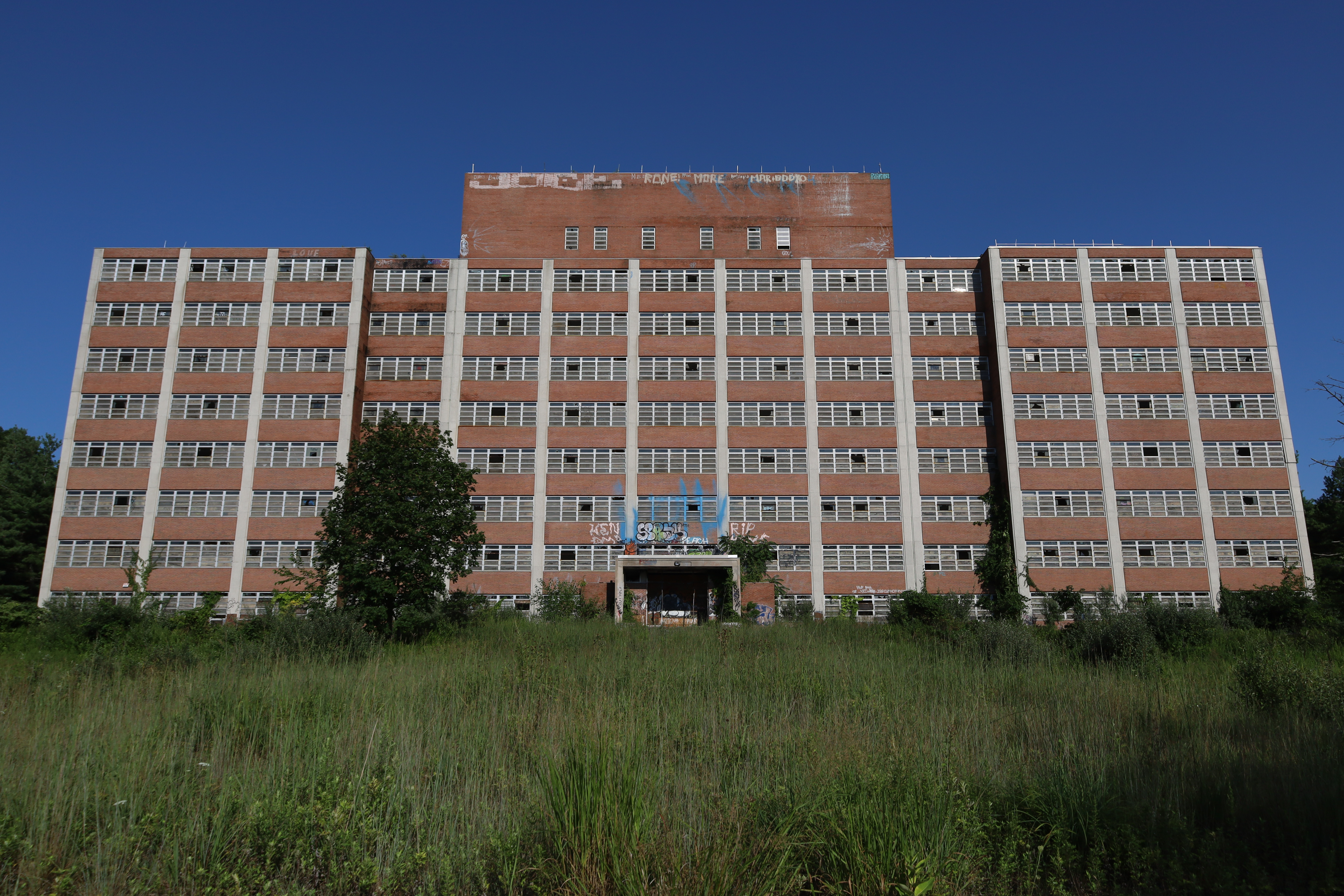
Building 7

- Building 7, a modern 10-story medical/surgical and office building constructed in 1966 and closed in 1996. Building 7 was connected to Building 21 and 22 through above-ground tunnels. The "cube" on top of the building served as a water tower and supported radio antennas used by the Smithtown Department of Public Safety and Kings Park Fire Department. Because of this, the building received full electricity until 2001.
- Buildings 41-43, also known as "The Quad", three connected buildings which together formed an "X" shape and housed geriatric patients. Buildings 41 and 42 were completed in 1932, while 43 was completed in 1933. The buildings were closed in 1992, along with Building 93.

=== Patient buildings ===
- Building 1, built as a Group 5 male reception building in 1934. Building 1 was the last facility on the campus to close, remaining open until November 2012 as a long-term adult patient care center.

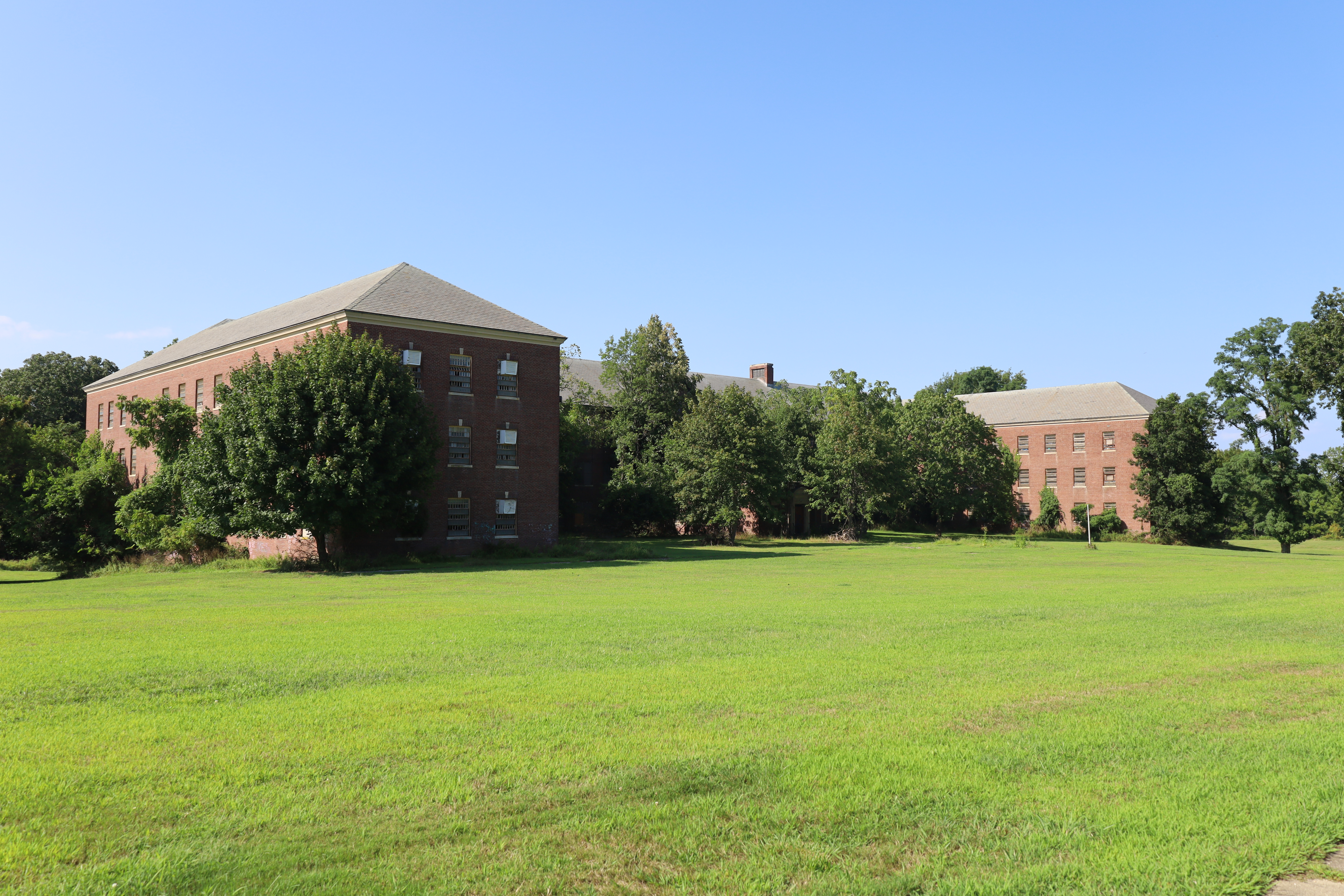
Building 15

- Building 15, also known as Wisteria House, a maximum security violent ward constructed in 1939 and closed in the 1990s.
- Building 39, Veteran's Group patient housing built in 1931.
- Building 122, a Group 2 patient ward built in 1912. The building closed in the mid-1970s.
- Building 136, a Group 3 patient ward built in 1926. Originally the medical/surgical building, it was converted to patient housing when Building 7 was opened.
- Building 138, Veteran's Group patient housing.
- Building 140, an isolation ward built in 1925.
- Buildings 150 and 151, cottage-style halfway houses built in 1987. These buildings are still in use and are operated by the state.

=== Outbuildings ===
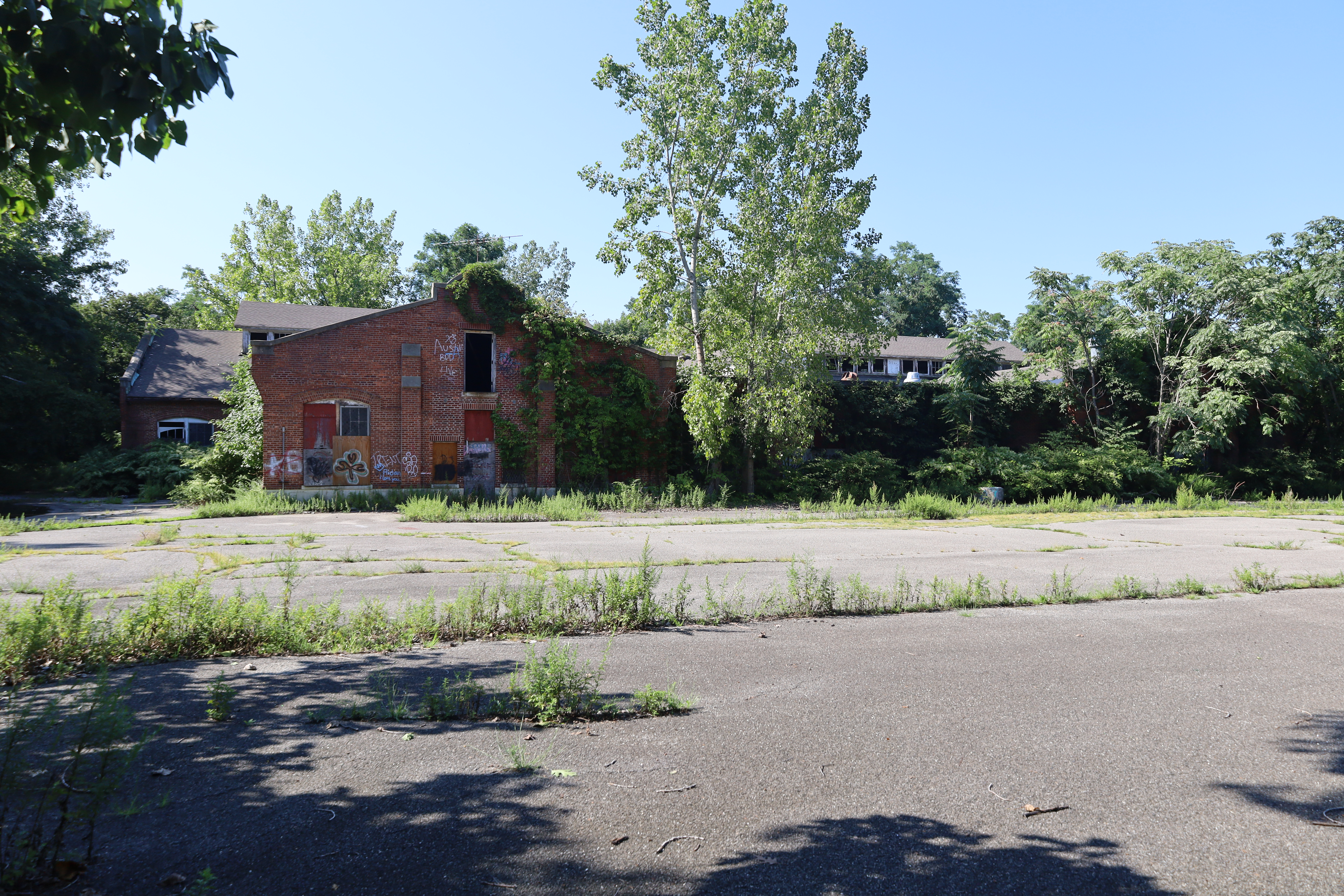
Building 5

- Building 3, administrative housing and offices built in 1934.
- Building 5, the maintenance shop built in 1909.
- Building 19, used for staff housing.

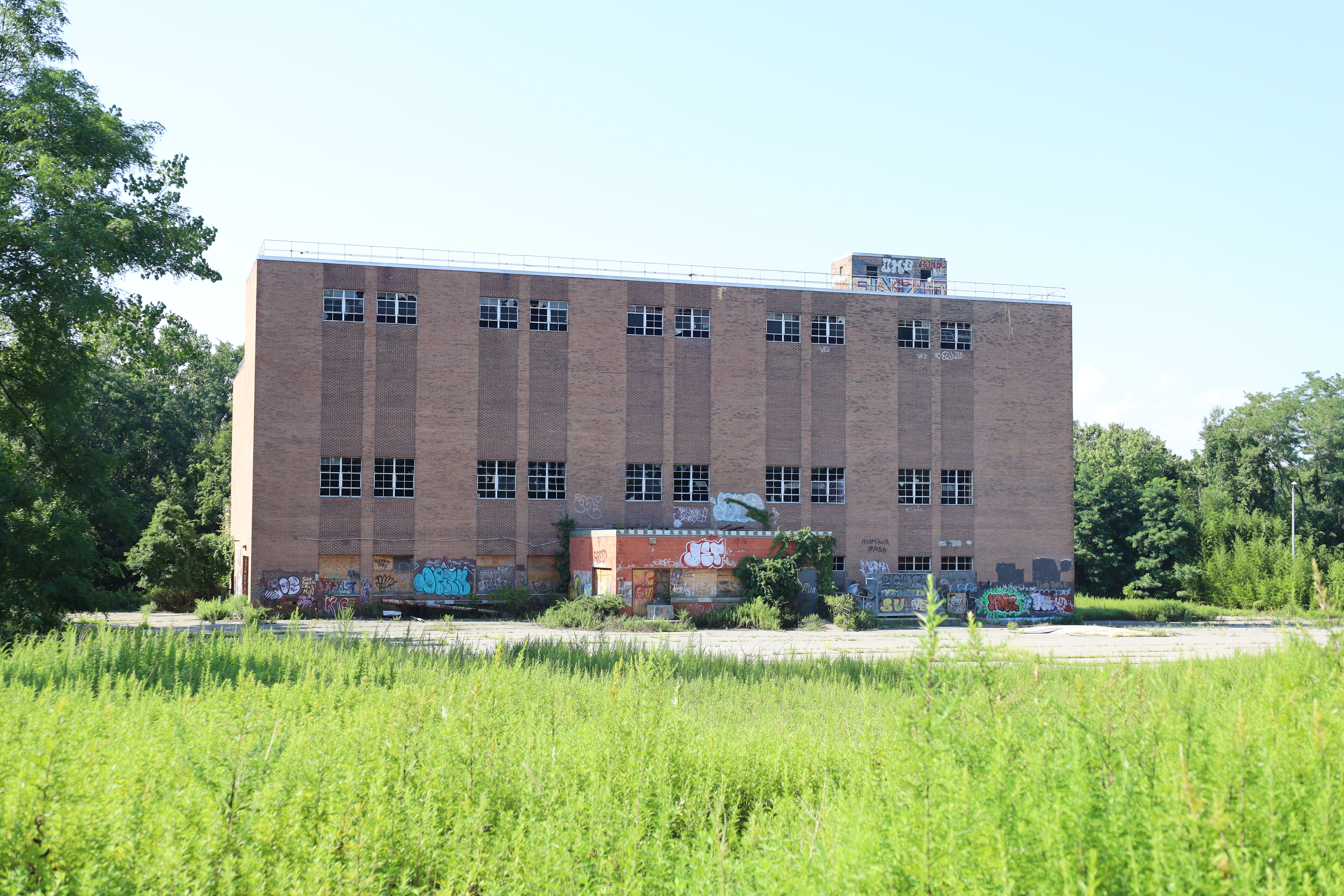
Building 29

- Building 29, the power plant built in 1967.
- Building 37, staff housing building built in 1931.
- Building 57, the electrical and plumbing shop.
- Building 59, originally the hospital's first power plant, later converted to maintenance workshops.
- Building 80, also known as York Hall, the hospital's main auditorium and theater. On the National Register of Historic Places since October 23, 2023. (#100009455)

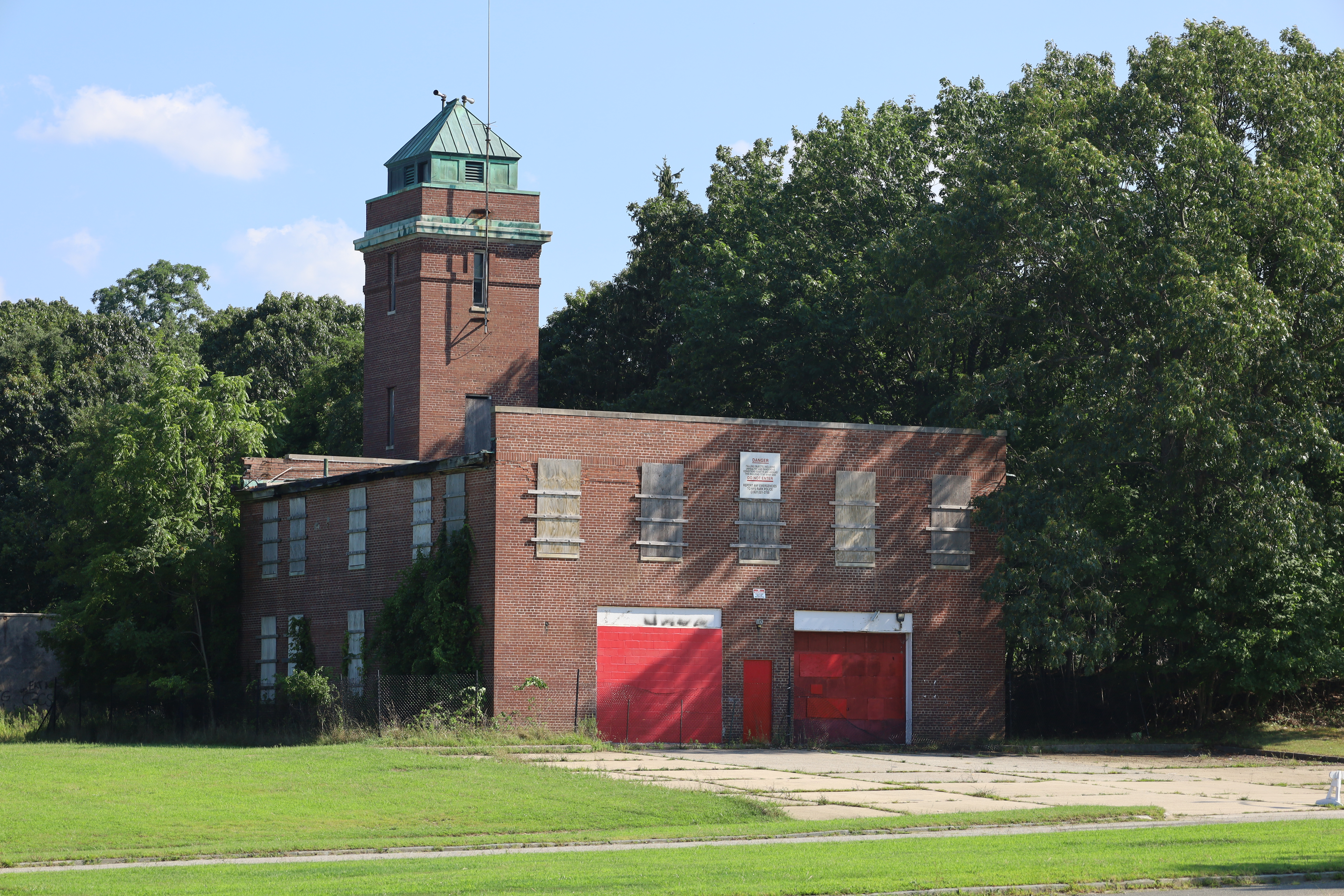
Building 83

- Building 83, the campus's firehouse.
- Building 90, also known as Macy Home, used for hospital offices.
- Building 94, the laundry building built in 1953.
- Buildings 95-101, cottages for doctor housing.
- Buildings 126-130, 132, cottages for doctor housing.
- Building 137, a kitchen/dining area for Group 3.
- Building 139, a kitchen/dining area for the Veteran's Group.

== Development ==
Since 1996, several proposals regarding the property have come and gone, and numerous developers have attempted to purchase the grounds from New York State. The development proposals have proven to be highly controversial as the former campus contains numerous obstacles to development. The greatest obstacles are several buildings that were demolished into their basements and buried while the hospital was still operating. Asbestos in these buildings was never properly abated. Other areas include buried ash containing unknown materials from the hospital's power generation facilities and asbestos in steam tunnels and remaining buildings. These problems created a fear in the surrounding community that developers will have no choice but to build high-density housing to offset the environmental clean-up costs and return a profit. In the spring of 2000, the waterfront portion of the former campus was reopened as the Nissequogue River State Park, protecting it from development.

Since the hospital closed its doors in 1996, trespassing has become a large problem at KPPC, as enthusiasts of the paranormal, amateur writers, and photographer hobbyists visit the grounds. Additionally, KPPC has a reputation on Long Island as being haunted. Vandalism has increased dramatically in recent years, with the interior of Building 93 and 7 being the focus of heavy graffiti. King's Park Psychiatric Center, A Documentation is an anonymously run website including video images of the buildings' vandalized interiors. Since entering the abandoned buildings is illegal, the property is patrolled by the New York State Park Police.

In January 2006, New York State aborted the sale of the property. Outgoing parks commissioner Bernadette Castro persuaded other state officials to transfer most of the hospital property to her agency. The plan called for 368 acres (1.49 km^{2}) to be added to Nissequogue River State Park. This also occurred in 2006 and approximately 90 percent of the campus is now part of the park. Part of the plan also included the demolition of 15 particularly dilapidated buildings, as well as unused access roads.

Demolition work on the 15 condemned buildings, scheduled to begin in May 2012, was pushed back to July. In late 2012, the state government ordered the removal of the buildings. On August 13, 2012, demolition of Building 123 (Group 2) began. The next day, demolition of Cafe 56 began; it has since has been demolished, but by September only a few of the other buildings had been removed. The towering smokestack on the site was imploded on March 27, 2013. Building 23 was the last to be demolished in May 2013.

From mid-2016 to early 2017, a second round of demolitions occurred at the site. The majority of these included smaller structures on the park side. Cottages 131, 133 & 134 were demolished in August 2016, and Building 135 & 142 were demolished in mid-September along with their respective steam tunnels. Cottages 130 and 132 are to remain at this time to be reused. Work continued into early 2017 with Buildings 44 and 89 removed in February of that year. Lastly, the water tank on Building 7 is set to be removed sometime in February 2017, in order to improve the look of the area for local residents who see it as an eyesore, however the prevalence of exterior graffiti on the rest of Building 7 and the majority of existing buildings still continue to remain an eyesore to the surrounding community and a nuisance attraction for trespassers and other illegal activities.

The former rail spur, abandoned in the late 1980s, was converted into part of a hike-bike trail in 2003. Pilgrim Psychiatric Center, which took the remaining patients from Kings Park, runs two group homes on the grounds.

== Notable people ==
=== Patients ===
- John R. Buckmaster (1915–1983)
- Jim Clinton (1850–1921)
- Percy Crosby (1891–1964)
- West Funk (1841–1897)

=== Staff ===
- David J. Impastato (1903–1986)
- Olga Von Tauber (1907–2002)

== In popular culture ==
The 1995 movie Eyes Beyond Seeing, by director Daniel Robert Cohn, was filmed in KPPC's Building 136/137 (old medical/surgical unit) shortly after the building was closed down. The film also contained exterior shots of the famous Building 93 (The 13-story-tall geriatric/ambulatory building), in an attempt to convince viewers that the interior shots were done inside 93. The film starred Keith Hamilton Cobb as a mental patient claiming to be Jesus Christ, and also featured a cameo by Henny Youngman, in his final movie appearance before his death, as a mental patient claiming to be Henny Youngman.

In 2009, Blood Night: The Legend of Mary Hatchet, written and directed by Frank Sabatella, was released. The film tells one version of the urban legend in the form of a ghost story about a patient committed to KPPC.

Building 93 of the psychiatric center was a primary location in the 2010 feature film Peripheral Vision, a thriller from filmmaker Michael D. D'Andrea.

Kings Park: Stories from an American Mental Institution, a documentary by former patient Lucy Winer about the history and legacy of the facility, was released on DVD and theatrically in 2013.
