= Smithtown (CDP), New York =

Smithtown, New York
- Hamlet and census-designated place
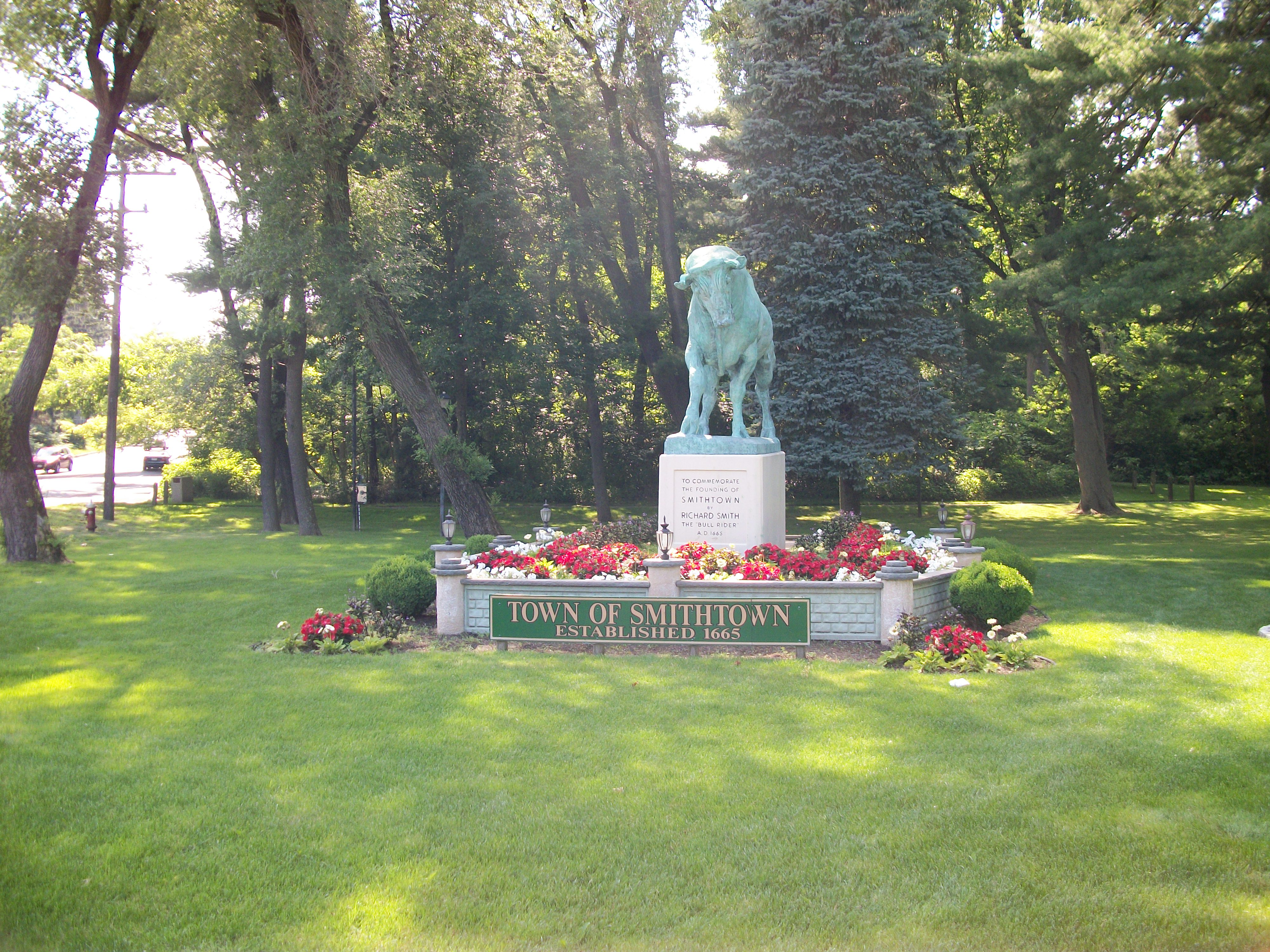
- The statue of the Smithtown Bull at the west end of the NY 25-25A multiplex

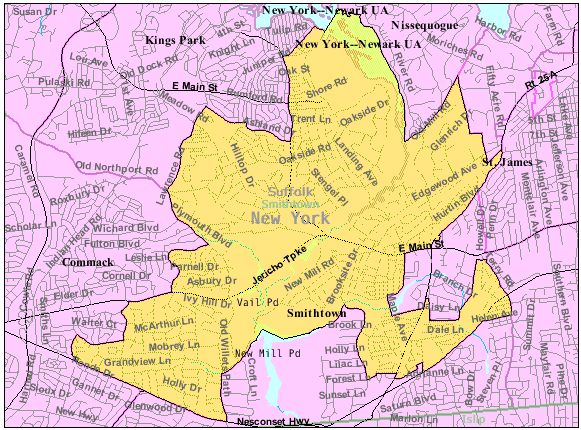
- U.S. Census Map

- Location on Long Island Location within the state of New York
- Coordinates: 40°51′21″N 73°12′53″W
- Country: United States
- State: New York
- County: Suffolk
- Town: Smithtown

Area
  - Total: 12.47 sq mi (32.31 km^{2})
  - Land: 11.93 sq mi (30.89 km^{2})
  - Water: 0.55 sq mi (1.42 km^{2})
- Elevation: 59 ft (18 m)

Population (2020)
  - Total: 25,629
  - Density: 2,148.8/sq mi (829.64/km^{2})
- Time zone: UTC-5 (Eastern (EST))
  - Summer (DST): UTC-4 (EDT)
- ZIP codes: 11787, 11788
- Area codes: 631, 934
- FIPS code: 36-67851
- GNIS feature ID: 0965531

Smithtown is a hamlet and census-designated place (CDP) within the Town of Smithtown in Suffolk County, New York. The population was 25,629 at the 2020 census.

The CDP includes the former Village of The Landing, which was dissolved in 1939. It also includes part of the hamlet of San Remo.

The Smithtown Post office zip code is 11787, however part of the hamlet is also covered by the Hauppauge post office mailing zone 11788 and the USPS allows to put Smithtown as an acceptable mailing address alternative.

== Geography ==
According to the United States Census Bureau, the CDP has a total area of 12.1 square miles (31.4 km^{2}), of which 11.6 square miles (30.1 km^{2}) is land and 0.50 square miles (1.3 km^{2}), or 4.00%, is water.

== Education ==
The vast majority of Smithtown is located within the Smithtown Central School District. However the Southwest is located within Hauppauge Union Free School District, and parts of the hamlet located within San Remo, are located within the Kings Park School District.

== Demographics ==
Historical population
Census	Pop.	Note	%±
2020	25,629		—
U.S. Decennial Census

As of the census of 2000, there were 26,901 people, 8,815 households, and 7,245 families residing in the CDP. The population density was 2,265.7 inhabitants per square mile (874.8/km^{2}). There were 8,956 housing units at an average density of 291.3 inhabitants/km^{2} (754.3 inhabitants/mi^{2}). The racial makeup of the CDP was 96.35% White, 0.61% African American, 0.04% Native American, 1.77% Asian, 0.01% Pacific Islander, 0.53% from other races, and 0.69% from two or more races. Hispanic or Latino of any race were 3.38% of the population.

There were 8,815 households, out of which 38.3% had children under the age of 18 living with them, 72.2% were married couples living together, 7.3% had a female householder with no husband present, and 17.8% were non-families. 14.9% of all households were made up of individuals, and 7.6% had someone living alone who was 65 years of age or older. The average household size was 2.96 and the average family size was 3.29.

In the CDP, the population was spread out, with 26.1% under the age of 18, 5.0% from 18 to 24, 30.1% from 25 to 44, 24.3% from 45 to 64, and 14.6% who were 65 years of age or older. The median age was 39 years. For every 100 females, there were 93.1 males. For every 100 females age 18 and over, there were 90.2 males.

The median income for a household in the CDP was $81,272, and the median income for a family was $88,235. Males had a median income of $62,802 versus $38,315 for females. The per capita income for the CDP was $31,521. About 2.0% of families and 3.1% of the population were below the poverty line, including 3.0% of those under the age of 18 and 4.4% ages 65 or older.

== Media, arts, and culture ==
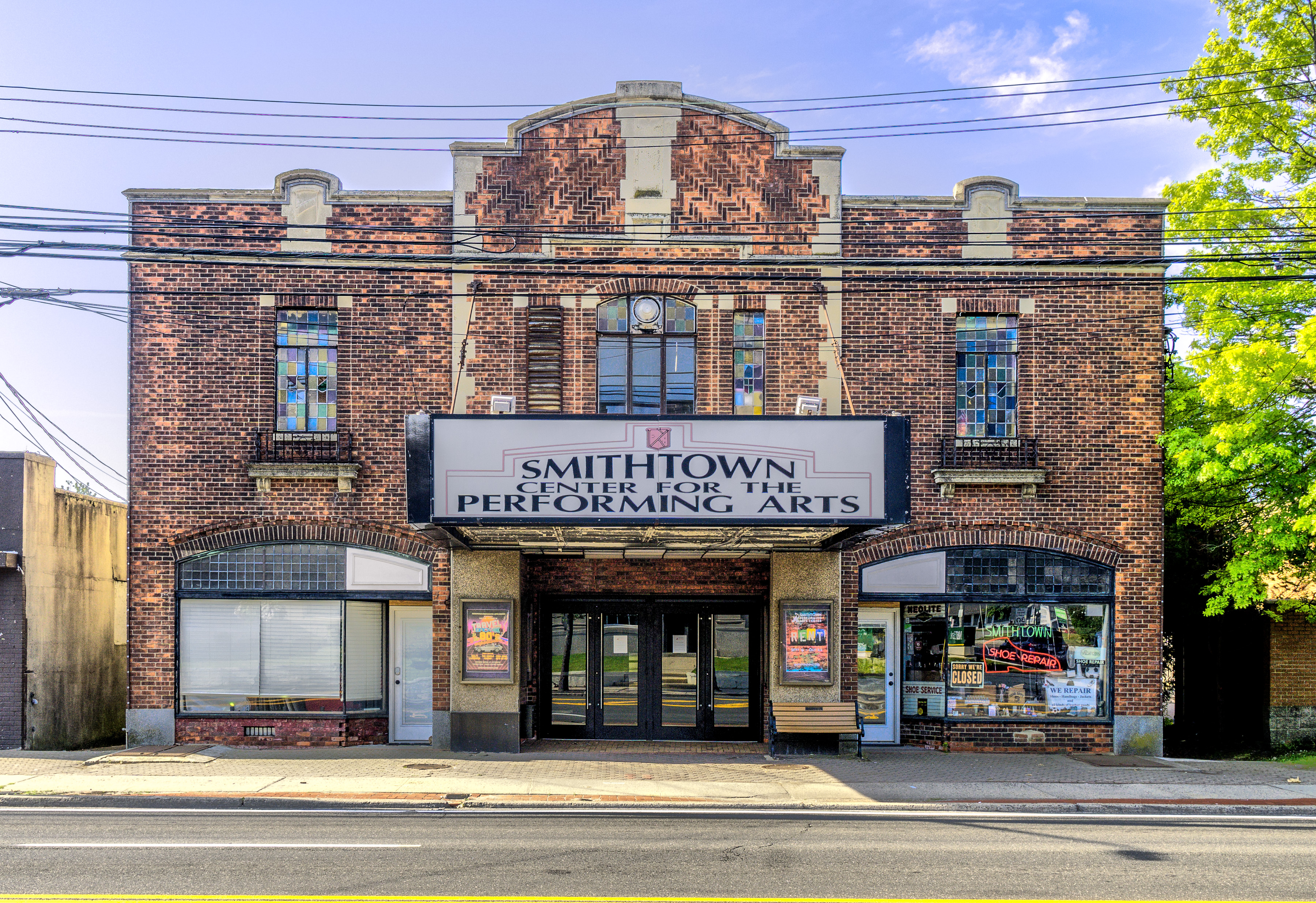
Smithtown Performing Arts Center

Smithtown is the city of license for two radio stations, WFRS and WWSK, and the TV station WFTY-DT. The Times of Smithtown newspaper carries community-based articles.

The Smithtown Performing Arts Center is a theater at 2 East Main Street. The historic building has not been significantly altered since it was built in 1933. It operated as a movie theater from 1933 to November 2001, and was renovated and restored to accommodate live performances in 2002. In 2022 the building was purchased by the nonprofit Smithtown Performing Arts Council, which programs a variety of live entertainment and community events including musicals, plays, music, comedy, educational classes and summer camps.

== See also ==
- Smithtown (LIRR station)
