= Montauk Highway =

Highway on Long Island, New York

Montauk Highway
- Map of eastern Long Island with the Montauk Highway in red (Section maintained as NY 900W backed in blue)

Route information
- Maintained by NYSDOT, Suffolk County DPW, and the villages of Patchogue and Southampton
- Length: 94.52 mi (152.12 km)
- Component highways: NY 27A from Amityville–Copiague line to Great River; CR 85 from Great River to Patchogue; CR 80 from Patchogue to Shinnecock Hills; NY 27 from Southampton to Montauk Point

Major junctions
- West end: NY 27A at the Amityville–Copiague line
- NY 231 in Babylon; Robert Moses Causeway in West Islip; NY 111 in Islip; Heckscher State Parkway in Great River; NY 27 in Great River; CR 97 in Bayport; NY 112 in Patchogue; NY 24 in Hampton Bays; NY 114 in East Hampton
- East end: Montauk Point State Park in Montauk

Location
- Country: United States
- State: New York
- County: Suffolk

Highway system
- New York Highways; Interstate; US; State; Reference; Parkways

Montauk Highway is an east–west road extending for 95 miles (153 km) across the southern shore of Long Island in Suffolk County, New York, in the United States. It extends from the Amityville–Copiague line, where it continues as Merrick Road, to Montauk Point State Park at the very eastern end of Long Island in Montauk. The highway is known by several designations along its routing, primarily New York State Route 27A (NY 27A) from the Amityville–Copiague line to Great River and NY 27 east of Southampton. The portion of Montauk Highway between Great River and Southampton is mostly county-maintained as County Route 80 and County Route 85 (CR 80 and CR 85, respectively).

The highway was one of the original through highways of Long Island, initially extending from Jamaica in the New York City borough of Queens to Montauk Point. Within Queens, the road is now known as Merrick Boulevard, and for its entire run in Nassau County, the road is Merrick Road, with the Montauk Highway designation picking up at the Amityville–Copiague line. The designations assigned to the road have also changed over time: Montauk Highway was the original route of NY 27 until most of it was superseded in purpose by Sunrise Highway, and for a brief time all of Montauk Highway west of Southampton was signed as NY 27A. It is still the southernmost through route on Long Island, although it has been realigned in several locations.

== Route description ==
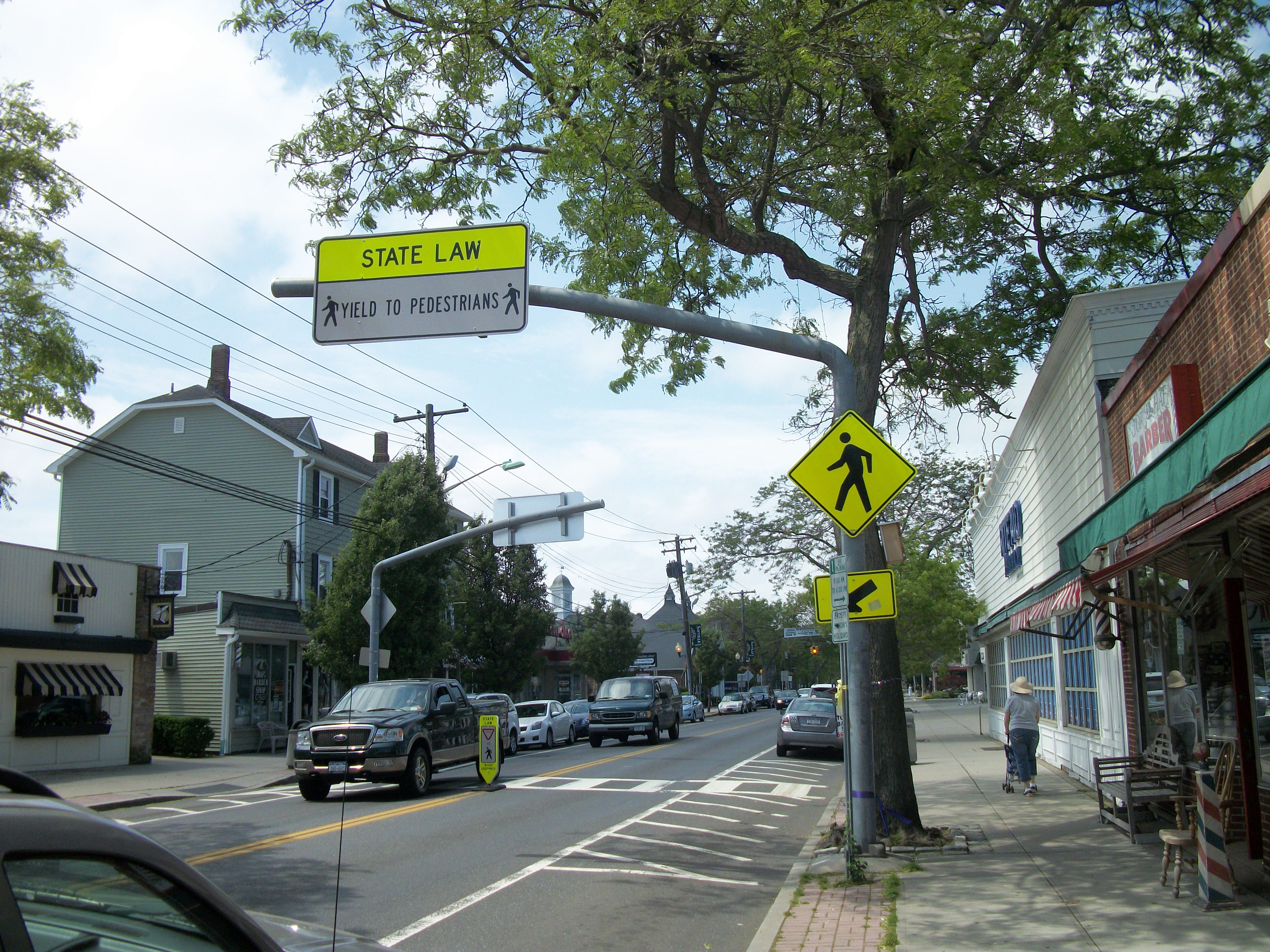
Montauk Highway Pedestrian Crosswalk; Sayville, New York

Montauk Highway begins at the Nassau–Suffolk county line, where it connects to Merrick Road. It heads east along the southern shore of Long Island, carrying NY 27A from Amityville to Great River. The highway generally narrows to two lanes in most places, especially through communities of which it forms the main street, such as Amityville, the village of Babylon, West Islip, Bay Shore, the hamlet of Islip, East Islip, Great River, Great River, Sayville, Patchogue, and Center Moriches. In these places, Montauk Highway is often called Main Street. In addition to being called Montauk Highway and Main Street in Suffolk County, it is also historically known as South Country Road, a name that is only used by former segments today.

NY 27A ends at NY 27 exit 46A in Great River, giving way to CR 85 along Montauk Highway. As CR 85, Montauk Highway runs through the hamlets of Great River, West Sayville, Sayville, Bayport, and Blue Point to the village of Patchogue, where the designation ends at CR 19. East of CR 19, Montauk Highway (known within the village as West and East Main streets) continues as a village-maintained street to the eastern village line, where it becomes CR 80, the designation that comprises most of Montauk Highway. Proceeding east from Patchogue, Montauk Highway runs through progressively less-densely populated communities. The segment east of Station Road in North Bellport and CR 36 in Brookhaven still contains old concrete pavement, a common practice of the mid-20th century. East of Speonk, the highway enters the Hamptons, the small-town, farming and summer resort communities especially popular with New York City summer vacationers.

Montauk Highway forms the main street of most of the communities in the Hamptons, such as Westhampton, Quogue, and Hampton Bays. CR 80 ends west of the village of Southampton at Knoll Road, at which point Montauk Highway becomes state-maintained again as NY 900W, an unsigned reference route. This ends at the Southampton village line, leaving Montauk Highway as a village-maintained street until it reconnects to NY 27 northeast of the village center. Now part of NY 27, Montauk Highway is the major, and occasionally the only through road in the area, passing through Bridgehampton, East Hampton, and Amagansett to reach Montauk. The highway and NY 27 end at a loop in the road at Montauk Point.

== History ==
=== Background ===
Montauk Highway was planned as the southernmost all-weather road on Long Island. It began in Jamaica, the county seat of Queens County and an important railroad junction located in the east-central part of the county. Montauk Highway was routed in a southeasterly direction toward the Atlantic Ocean coastline of Long Island, turning in an east-northeasterly direction in current Nassau County to more or less parallel the shore through Suffolk County, ending at Montauk Point, the easternmost point of land on the South Fork of the island. As an all-weather road, Montauk Highway has rarely been breached by even serious storms; however, portions in the Hamptons were flooded out by the New England Hurricane of 1938.

The current road is no longer a single route-designated road. In Queens, it is a city street known as Merrick Boulevard. Through Nassau County, it is a two-to-four lane highway with traffic lights known as Merrick Road. This name is derived from the community of Merrick, through which the road passes. As such, the Montauk Highway name now applies to the section that lies within Suffolk County.

=== Initial designations ===
Montauk Highway and Merrick Road were designated as NY 27 from the New York City line to Amagansett in the mid-1920s. From East Patchogue to Brookhaven, NY 27 followed South Country Road instead, which was part of Montauk Highway at the time. The NY 27 designation was extended eastward along Montauk Highway to Montauk Point by 1930. On February 24, 1930, South Country Road was added to the Suffolk County highway system as CR 36. NY 27 and Montauk Highway were realigned to directly connect East Patchogue and Brookhaven via North Bellport.

NY 27 was realigned west of Great River c. 1931 to follow Sunrise Boulevard (the predecessor to Sunrise Highway), a new, parallel highway to Merrick Road and Montauk Highway between the New York City line and Massapequa and several local roads from Massapequa to Montauk Highway in Great River. The former routing of NY 27 on Montauk Highway from Massapequa to Great River became NY 27A, which connected to NY 27 in Massapequa by way of County Line Road. NY 27A was extended eastward along Montauk Highway to Patchogue in the early 1950s, after NY 27 was realigned to follow a new highway between Great River and Patchogue. A controlled-access extension of NY 27 to Shirley opened to traffic in the late 1950s, at which time NY 27A was extended eastward along NY 27's former routing to meet NY 27 in Shirley.

Construction on a new alignment for NY 27 between NY 24 in Hampton Bays and Montauk Highway near Water Mill began by 1961 and was completed around 1962. The section of Montauk Highway between the two locations became part of NY 27A, even though it did not connect to any other part of the route. An extension of the Patchogue–Shirley limited-access highway to the vicinity of Eastport was completed as a realignment of NY 27 by 1964, allowing NY 27A to be extended once more along Montauk Highway. NY 27A was also extended east to Hampton Bays at this time, connecting to the segment of NY 27A between Hampton Bays and Water Mill and creating an overlap with NY 27.

=== Maintenance transfers ===
Ownership and maintenance of Montauk Highway between Great River and the town of Southampton was gradually transferred from the state of New York to Suffolk County during the 1960s and 1970s. The portion from the Patchogue village line east to NY 24 in Hampton Bays was turned over to the county on October 6, 1966, while the segment between NY 24 and Knoll Road was given to Suffolk County on February 15, 1968. This section of Montauk Highway became CR 80, a route 32.50 miles (52.30 km) in length. The CR 80 designation was previously used for the Nesconset–Port Jefferson Highway, a road acquired by the New York State Department of Transportation (NYSDOT) and designated NY 347 in 1966.

Although most of Montauk Highway between Patchogue and the village of Southampton was now maintained by the county, NY 27A continued to follow the road eastward to NY 27 northeast of Southampton. It was finally cut back to its current eastern terminus in Great River on March 29, 1972, after ownership and maintenance of Montauk Highway between Great River and CR 19 in Patchogue was transferred from the state to the county. The new 8.24-mile (13.26 km) county road was redesignated CR 85, a number used for the Smithtown Bypass until 1966, when that road was transferred to NYSDOT and designated NY 347. A 2.85-mile (4.59 km) section of Montauk Highway between Knoll Road to the west village line of Southampton at Tuckahoe Lane was retained by the state of New York and designated NY 900W, an unsigned reference route.

Between the east end of CR 98 and the vicinity of the west end of CR 71, the Suffolk County Department of Public Works had once planned to widen the road from two lanes to four lanes.

=== Realignments ===
Over the years, Montauk Highway has been realigned in several locations. The former segments are now known by another name or as Old Montauk Highway, notably at Theodore Roosevelt County Park east of Montauk, where new Montauk Highway heads northeast through Montauk Point State Park while Old Montauk Highway heads east as a narrow hilly road next to the shoreline. Other significant realignments include the aforementioned rerouting between East Patchogue and Brookhaven and another in the vicinity of Eastport, where CR 71 (Old Country Road) was part of Montauk Highway between the current road and Eastport–Manor Road (CR 55). From there, Montauk Highway turned south along CR 55 to reconnect to its modern routing. Another former section is located between Montauk Beach and Montauk, where the modern road was altered to bypass the former to the north. The old road breaks from the current highway inside Hither Hills State Park and heads through Montauk Beach before rejoining the highway between South Dearborn Place and Second House Road.

Many smaller sections also exist:

- Great River: a segment split in two broken as a result of the Oakdale Merge, both used to access fishing areas in Connetquot River State Park: Bubble Falls and Rattlesnake Brook
- Sayville: Amy Drive to Old Broadway Avenue
- Brookhaven: in front of a private residence near Yaphank Avenue
- South Haven: Old South Country Road
- Mastic: Old Montauk Highway from Washington Avenue to Mastic Road
- Moriches: from Barnes Road on the East Lake of the Forge River to an undetermined location
- Center Moriches: private road east of Old Neck Road leading to houses north of the LIRR Montauk Branch.
- East Moriches: Camp Paquatuck to Mill Pond Lane.
- Speonk: Old Montauk Highway in the vicinity of Mill Road
- Water Mill: Old Country Road
- Wainscott: Old Montauk Highway in the vicinity of Wainscott Stone Road
- Amagansett: Skimhampton Road and Further Lane as well as Old Montauk Highway connected by a now-abandoned segment of Old Montauk Highway that ran parallel to Bluff Road
- Napeague: Cranberry Hole Road (unsigned CR 33) and Napeague Meadow Road.
- Montauk: two segments of Old Montauk Highway, including one in Camp Hero State Park

== Major intersections ==
The entire route is in Suffolk County.

| Location | mi | km | Destinations | Notes |
|---|---|---|---|---|
| Amityville–Copiague line | 0.00 | 0.00 | NY 27A west (Merrick Road) | Continuation west; western end of NY 27A concurrency; former NY 27 |
| Village of Babylon | 5.19 | 8.35 | NY 109 west – Farmingdale | Eastern terminus of NY 109 |
| Village of Babylon | 6.08 | 9.78 | NY 231 north – Huntington | Southern terminus of NY 231 |
| West Islip | 7.65 | 12.31 | Robert Moses Causeway to Southern State Parkway – Ocean Beaches | Exits RM2E-W on Robert Moses Causeway |
| Community of Islip | 12.73 | 20.49 | NY 111 north (Islip Avenue) | Southern terminus of NY 111 |
| East Islip | | | CR 17 north (Carleton Avenue) | Southern terminus of CR 17; former NY 111 |
| East Islip | 14.68 | 23.63 | Heckscher State Parkway to NY 27 – New York, Heckscher Park | Exits 45W-E on Heckscher State Parkway |
| Great River | 16.09 | 25.89 | NY 27A becomes CR 85 | |
| Sayville | 20.13 | 32.40 | CR 65 east (Middle Road) | Western terminus of CR 65 |
| Bayport | 21.29 | 34.26 | CR 18 north (Broadway Avenue) | Southern terminus of CR 18 |
| Blue Point | 22.66 | 36.47 | CR 97 north (Nicolls Road) – Stony Brook | Southern terminus of CR 97 |
| Patchogue | 24.33 | 39.16 | CR 19 (West Avenue) CR 85 ends | Eastern terminus of CR 85 |
| Patchogue | | | NY 112 north (Medford Avenue) | Southern terminus of NY 112 |
| Patchogue–East Patchogue line | | | CR 80 begins | |
| East Patchogue | 25.76 | 41.46 | CR 36 east (South Country Road) | Western terminus of CR 36; former routing of Montauk Highway |
| East Patchogue | 26.13 | 42.05 | CR 101 north (Patchogue–Yaphank Road) | Southern terminus of CR 101 |
| Hamlet of Brookhaven | 30.02 | 48.31 | CR 36 west (South Country Road) | Eastern terminus of CR 36; former routing of Montauk Highway |
| Hamlet of Brookhaven | 30.22 | 48.63 | CR 21 north (Yaphank Avenue) | Southern terminus of CR 21 |
| South Haven | 30.88 | 49.70 | CR 16 west (Horseblock Road) | Eastern terminus of CR 16 |
| Shirley | 33.14 | 53.33 | CR 46 (William Floyd Parkway) – Fire Island | |
| Moriches | 36.24 | 58.32 | CR 98 east (Moriches Bypass) – Riverhead, Southampton | Western terminus of CR 98 |
| Moriches | | | CR 80 Truck east (Old Neck Road) | Western terminus of CR 80 Truck |
| Center Moriches | | | CR 80 Truck west (Wilcox Avenue) | Eastern terminus of CR 80 Truck |
| East Moriches | 39.82 | 64.08 | CR 98 west (Moriches Bypass) – Shirley, Patchogue | Eastern terminus of CR 98 |
| East Moriches | 40.09 | 64.52 | CR 51 north (Moriches–Riverhead Road) – Riverhead | Southern terminus of CR 51 |
| Eastport | 40.98 | 65.95 | CR 71 east (Old Country Road) | Western terminus of CR 71 |
| Eastport | | | CR 80 Truck east (North Bay Avenue) | Western terminus of CR 80 Truck |
| Eastport | | | CR 80 Truck east (North Phillips Avenue) | Eastern terminus of CR 80 Truck |
| Eastport | 41.46 | 66.72 | CR 55 north (Eastport Manor Road) to NY 27 | Southern terminus of CR 55 |
| Westhampton | 45.71 | 73.56 | CR 71 west (Old Country Road) | |
| Westhampton | 46.41 | 74.69 | CR 31 north (Old Riverhead Road) to NY 27 | Southern terminus of CR 31 |
| Quogue | 49.49 | 79.65 | CR 104 north (Quogue Riverhead Road) | Southern terminus of CR 104 |
| Hampton Bays | 54.22 | 87.26 | NY 24 north to NY 27 | Southern terminus of NY 24 |
| Hampton Bays | 54.87 | 88.30 | CR 32 south (Squiretown Road) – Hampton Bays | Northern terminus of CR 32 |
| Hampton Bays | 56.05 | 90.20 | CR 62 north (Newtown Road) | No eastbound entrance; southern terminus of CR 62 |
| Hampton Bays | 56.20 | 90.45 | CR 39 east (North Road) to NY 27 | Western terminus of CR 39 |
| Shinnecock Hills | | | CR 80 ends | |
| Village of Southampton | 63.62 | 102.39 | NY 27 west / CR 39A west – New York | Western end of NY 27 concurrency; eastern terminus of CR 39A |
| Bridgehampton | | | CR 79 north – Sag Harbor, Shelter Island | Southern terminus of CR 79 |
| Village of East Hampton | | | Stephen Hands Path (CR 113 north) – Northwest Harbor, Cedar Point | |
| Village of East Hampton | | | NY 114 north (Buell Lane) – Sag Harbor, Shelter Island | Southern terminus of NY 114 |
| Montauk | | | Montauk Point State Park NY 27 ends | Eastern terminus; eastern terminus of NY 27 |
1.000 mi = 1.609 km; 1.000 km = 0.621 mi: Concurrency terminus; Incomplete access; Route transition

== In popular culture ==
- Paul Simon "drove the Montauk Highway" in the song "Dazzling Blue" on the album So Beautiful or So What
