= List of county routes in Suffolk County, New York (101–117) =

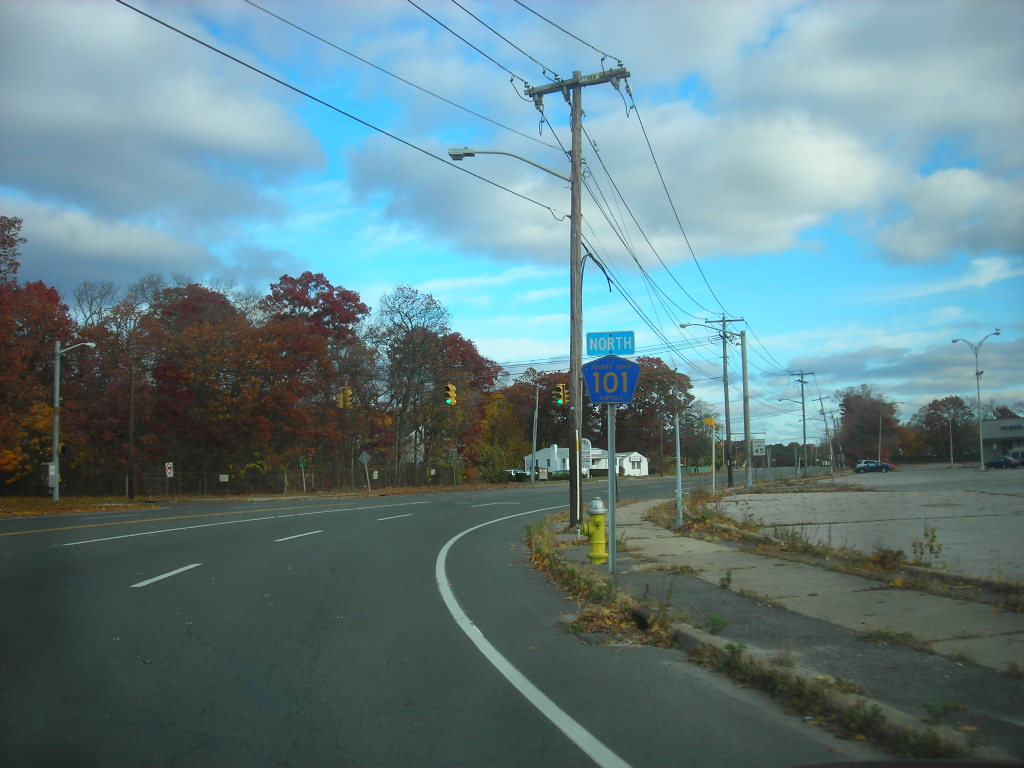
- CR 101 heading northbound with old Suffolk County signage on the right

Highway names
- Interstates: Interstate X (I-X)
- US Highways: U.S. Route X (US X)
- State: New York State Route X (NY X)
- County: County Route X (CR X)

System links
- New York Highways; Interstate; US; State; Reference; Parkways

County routes in Suffolk County, New York, are maintained by the Suffolk County Department of Public Works and signed with the Manual on Uniform Traffic Control Devices-standard yellow-on-blue pentagon route marker. The designations do not follow any fixed pattern. Routes 101 to 117 are listed below.

== County Route 101 ==
County Route 101
- Location: East Patchogue–Yaphank
- Length: 8.4 mi (13.5 km)
- Existed: 1961–present

County Route 101 runs northeast and southwest from CR 80 (Montauk Highway) to Long Island Avenue, north of exit 66 on the Long Island Expressway. The road is known as Patchogue–Yaphank Road in some sections and Sills Road in others. Patchogue–Yaphank Road continues past Long Island Avenue as a Brookhaven-maintained road.

Like many of the roads built by Suffolk County between the 1940s and 1970s, it had the potential to be upgraded into a limited-access highway, but those proposals were thwarted by development and public opposition.

History

At one point, much of the road was intended to be part of the formerly proposed Atlantic Expressway. When the New York State Department of Transportation caved into public opposition and cancelled the expressway in 1966, Suffolk County took up the task of improving CR 101 for itself. Upon doing so in the 1970s, two segments were realigned: one between Hospital Road and Martha Avenue in East Patchogue, and the other between Old Dock Road and the eastbound service road of I-495 (Long Island Expressway) in Yaphank. Suffolk County Department of Public Works built a bridge over NY 27 parallel to the one built by the New York State Department of Transportation as part of the improvement project.

The former segment between Hospital Road and Gazzola Drive (formerly part of Sipp Avenue) was left to local residents. One portion of the segment between Gazzola Drive and Martha Avenue became an extension of Martha Avenue with a connecting road to CR 101, while the rest of it was closed to traffic in the late 1980s. That segment was replaced with a dead end street leading to a series of condominiums in the early-21st Century.

The former segment between Old Dock and the Long Island Expressway was abandoned south of the main line of the Long Island Rail Road, while the rest of it as well as a connecting road in between was made into an extension of Long Island Avenue. The south side of the bridge over the railroad tracks that replaced the old one also contains a right-of-way for the formerly proposed CR 90 (Central Suffolk Highway).

Proposed extension

CR 101 terminates at the northern intersection of another Long Island Avenue, although Patchogue–Yaphank Road continues in a northwesterly direction as it curves towards the heart of Yaphank. However the Suffolk County Department of Public Works originally planned to extend CR 101 from the northeast corner of that intersection over Gerard Road, Lower Yaphank Lake, CR 21 (East Main Street) and eventually to a future interchange with CR 46 and Longwood Road at the entrance to the Brookhaven National Laboratory in Upton.

In addition, at the vicinity of the interchange with the Long Island Expressway, there was to be a southern terminus of CR 8 (the proposed Yaphank Bypass). This was planned either in conjunction with the Sills Road extension, or in the event of its cancellation.

Major intersections

Location	mi	km	Destinations	Notes
East Patchogue	0.00	0.00	CR 80 (Montauk Highway)	Former NY 27A
East Patchogue			NY 27 – New York, Montauk	Exit 55 on NY 27
Medford			CR 99 (Woodside Avenue)	
North Bellport			CR 16 (Horseblock Road) – Medford	Formerly CR 56
Yaphank			I-495	Exit 66 on I-495
Yaphank			Long Island Avenue / Sills Road north – Yaphank, Middle Island, Riverhead	Continuation north and east
1.000 mi = 1.609 km; 1.000 km = 0.621 mi

== County Route 102 ==
County Route 102
- Location: Yaphank

County Route 102 was a formerly proposed four-lane county road in Yaphank, that began along East Main Street east of CR 21 (Yaphank Avenue). Unlike the existing East Main Street, it was not intended to become Moriches–Middle Island Road and cross over the Long Island Expressway. The road intended to terminate at the westbound service road of the interchange between the Long Island Expressway and William Floyd Parkway.

== County Route 103 ==
County Route 103
- Location: Cranberry Bog County Park

County Route 103 was intended to be Cedar Swamp Road, a proposed road northwest of CR 51 within Cranberry Bog County Park leading toward the Long Island Expressway.

== County Route 104 ==
County Route 104
- Location: Quogue–Riverhead
- Length: 7.47 mi (12.02 km)
- Existed: 1972–present

County Route 104 is a north–south highway connecting CR 80 in Quogue to NY 24, CR 63 and CR 94 just outside Riverhead. Much of CR 104 runs through the David Allen Sarnoff Pine Barrens Preserve, a major New York State Conservation Area, that was once owned by Radio Corporation of America. From 1930 to 1972, the road was signed as NY 113.

== County Route 104A ==
County Route 104A
- Location: Oakville–East Quogue
- Existed: 1972–1986

County Route 104A was Lewis Road, a suffixed route of CR 104 running southeast from Oakville to CR 80 (Montauk Highway) in East Quogue. Today the road is designated as the Lewis Road Bike Route by the Town of Southampton.

== County Route 105 ==
County Route 105
- Location: Flanders–Northville
- Length: 5.3 mi (8.5 km)

County Route 105 is a major county road connecting CR 104 in the David Allen Sarnoff State Pine Barrens Preserve, which bypasses downtown Riverhead and leads to Sound Avenue in Northville.

== County Route 106 ==
County Route 106
- Location: Brentwood
- Existed: 1975–present

County Route 106 is a road spanning from Pilgrim State Psychiatric Center to CR 7, which was originally part of the hospital when it had more territory. Pilgrim State called it "G Road," a name it still contains within the hospital. The entire road runs along a Long Island Power Authority power line right-of-way, which was inherited from the Long Island Lighting Company.

Route description

CR 106 begins as G Road in Pilgrim State Psychiatric Center in Brentwood, where the former Pilgrim State Hospital Railroad Station can be found on the southwest corner of the Sagtikos State Parkway underpass. G Road becomes Campus Road (also signed as Community College Drive), and the road serves as northbound exit S2 in Brentwood. That interchange is actually for either the hospital or for the next intersection, which is CR 13 (Crooked Hill Road). From there the road serves as the southern border of Suffolk County Community College's Grant Campus and the northern border of both Brentwood State Park and the Brentwood North Middle School. The road ends at an intersection with CR 7 (Wicks Road).

Major intersections

The entire route is in Brentwood.

mi	km	Destinations	Notes
0.00	0.00	Pilgrim Psychiatric Center	
		Sagtikos State Parkway north	Exit ramp from northbound Sagtikos Parkway at exit S2
		Crooked Hill Road (CR 13)	Serves other movements to/from the Sagtikos Parkway
		Wicks Road (CR 7)	
1.000 mi = 1.609 km; 1.000 km = 0.621 mi: Incomplete access

== County Route 107 ==
County Route 107
- Location: West Babylon
- Length: 1.7 mi (2.7 km)
- Existed: 1961–present

County Route 107 is unmarked along Belmont Avenue within Babylon Township. It runs northeast and southwest.

Route description

CR 107 begins at CR 95 (Little East Neck Road). Four blocks later both roads go over NY 27, and share exit 38. North of NY 27, various residential perpendicular streets cross CR 107, the exception being Hubbards Path, which terminates at CR 107 and runs southeast towards the Village of Babylon.

The last major intersection is the interchange with Southern State Parkway (exit 37) in North Babylon, which is just south of the terminus of the road at the entrance to the New York State Office of Parks, Recreation and Historic Preservation Long Island Headquarters in Belmont Lake State Park, across from Essex Street. Belmont Avenue continues northbound to Wyandanch Avenue and August Road as a town of Babylon maintained road.

History

When Suffolk County Department of Public Works originally established CR 107 on June 22, 1961, the road included CR 95, along Little East Neck Road from NY 109 to Belmont Avenue. This would change when CR 95 was installed on all of Little East Neck Road on June 12, 1973 and CR 107 was truncated.

The route was proposed to be relocated onto Hubbard's Path and Cadman Avenue as part of its potential transformation into the West Babylon–Centerport Highway. Then, it used the remainder of Belmont Avenue which was to be extended north of Belmont Lake State Park towards the vicinity of exit 50 on the Long Island Expressway. At Half Hollow Road (CR 67) it would have replaced Carman Road and much of Pigeon Hill Road, then curve to the northeast and intersect with NY 25 (Jericho Turnpike) onto CR 86, most if not all of which it was also intended to replace.

Major intersections

The entire route is in West Babylon.

mi	km	Destinations	Notes
0.0	0.0	Little East Neck Road (CR 95)	
0.3	0.48	To NY 27	Exit 38 on NY 27; access via local roads
1.6	2.6	Southern State Parkway	Exits 37N-S on Southern Parkway
1.7	2.7	Long Island State Parks Regional Headquarters	Continues north as a locally-maintained road
1.000 mi = 1.609 km; 1.000 km = 0.621 mi

== County Route 108 ==
County Route 108
- Location: Central Islip–Smithtown
- Existed: 1962–present

County Route 108 is known as Caleb's Path from NY 111 to Motor Parkway and Old Willets Path from Motor Parkway to NY 25 near Caleb Smith State Park. Due to the fact that the road is bisected by the Long Island Expressway, northbound CR 108 is forced into a short concurrency with westbound Long Island Motor Parkway at exit 55.

Route description

CR 108 begins at NY 111, which heads northeast as CR 108 heads northwest. At the intersection with the Long Island Motor Parkway, CR 108 joins westbound CR 67, while Caleb's Path continues north as a town of Islip road that ends at the eastbound service road of the Long Island Expressway, on the corner of a Greyhound Bus Terminal, which was originally a Texaco gas station. After crossing the LIE and its two service roads, CR 108 branches off to the east and crosses the Islip–Smithtown town line, where it rejoins its original segment, which is also at the western terminus of CR 6. From here it runs straight north where descends along the Ronkonkoma Moraine, passing by the site of the former Brentwood Mackay Radio Station until it curves northwest again and approaches the next major intersection at NY 454. The northeast corner of NY 454 and CR 108 is the 4th Precinct of the Suffolk County Police Department, which was once the Smithtown Aviation Country Club until 1957. Across from this police precinct is the eastern terminus of New Highway.

Turning straight north again, the road runs through some residential areas until it curves northeast as it approaches Caleb Smith State Park, where the formerly proposed Northern State Parkway extension was supposed to be built a former section of the road that currently enters the park. Here CR 108 curves back north again and finally terminates at Jericho Turnpike, as does Old Willet's Path, which turns into Plymouth Boulevard, a Town of Smithtown residential street.

History

When CR 108 was originally designated, the southern terminus was on the northwest corner of the intersection with NY 111 and CR 100 until the late 1980s. A formerly proposed extension was intended to run along Plymouth Boulevard and Old Northport Road, and then would have terminated at CR 11. In 1973, the road and the northern terminus were realigned toward Plymouth Blvd, while the original northern terminus became part of Caleb Smith State Park.

Major intersections

Location	mi	km	Destinations	Notes
Central Islip	0.00	0.00	NY 111 (Joshua's Path) to CR 100	No southbound access to NY 111 north
Brentwood			CR 67 east (Motor Parkway) – Bethpage Ballpark	Southern terminus of concurrency with CR 67
Hauppauge			I-495	Exit 55 on I-495
Hauppauge			CR 67 west (Motor Parkway)	Northern terminus of concurrency with CR 67
Hauppauge			CR 6 east (Rabro Drive)	Western terminus of CR 6
Hauppauge			NY 347 / NY 454 (Veterans Memorial Highway)	
Smithtown			NY 25 (Jericho Turnpike) / Plymouth Boulevard north	Continues north without designation
1.000 mi = 1.609 km; 1.000 km = 0.621 mi: Concurrency terminus

== County Route 110 ==
County Route 110
- Location: Centereach–Poquott

County Route 110 was intended for the unbuilt four-lane highway known as the A.O. Smith Turnpike. The road was to begin at CR 97 in Centereach, replacing Wireless Road, then continue north of NY 347 running through South Setauket and East Setauket, where it would have utilized a portion of Sheep Pasture Road and all of Hulse Road, continuing north of Old Post Road into Poquott, where it would've either made a U-turn along the west shore of Port Jefferson Harbor, or connected to a possible bridge to Bridgeport, Connecticut.

== County Route 111 ==
County Route 111
- Location: Eastport–Manorville

County Route 111 is the Captain Daniel Roe Highway; however, it was originally proposed as the Port Jefferson–Westhampton Beach Highway.

== County Route 112 ==
County Route 112
- Location: Sayville–Islip Airport
- Length: 1.38 mi (2.22 km)
- Existed: 1964–present

County Route 112 is Johnson Avenue between NY 27 and NY 454 at the entrance to the Long Island MacArthur Airport. The route is unsigned due to its close proximity to NY 112. Johnson Avenue begins at Lakeland Avenue and Tariff Street as a town road maintained by the town of Islip. It becomes CR 112 at the interchange with NY 27 (exit 50A), at which point the road widens from two to four lanes. North of Sunrise Highway, the route intersects Church Street before turning northwest. The road eventually intersects NY 454 before turning into the entrance to MacArthur Airport.

Johnson Avenue was originally known as Moscow Avenue, and reached as far north as the vicinity of Ronkonkoma Station until the Long Island MacArthur Airport was built. The road was officially designated CR 112 on April 30, 1964.

Major intersections

Location	mi	km	Destinations	Notes
Sayville–Bohemia line	0.0	0.0	NY 27 / Johnson Avenue south – New York, Montauk	Exit 50A on NY 27; continues south without designation
Bohemia–Ronkonkoma line	1.5	2.4	NY 454 to NY 27 / I-495	
Ronkonkoma	1.7	2.7	Long Island MacArthur Airport	
1.000 mi = 1.609 km; 1.000 km = 0.621 mi

== County Route 113 ==
County Route 113
- Location: Georgica–Northwest Harbor
- Length: 2.5 mi (4.0 km)
- Existed: 1966–present

County Route 113 is an unmarked street named Stephen Hands Path near the village of East Hampton. The route was established in 1966, and the intended northern terminus was to be at the formerly proposed CR 59.

Route description

The south end of the road begins at NY 27 in Georgica across from a nature preserve designed to protect the wetlands around Georgica Pond. The road curves from northeast to straight north before reaching a low(10'1") and narrow bridge beneath the Montauk Branch of the Long Island Rail Road. Later it curves northeast again, before reaching a LIPA power line right of way, and then the intersection of Buckskill Road. The first major intersection north of the Montauk Branch is NY 114 in East Hampton. From there the road enters Northwest Harbor, where it passes by some farmland and intersects both Long Lane and Two Holes of Water Road, of which the former is also CR 59 and was planned to be a proposed bypass of NY 114 around the village of East Hampton.

In the vicinity of a fork in the road with Old Northwest Road, CR 113 was intended to terminate at the proposed extension of Sunrise Highway, which was also intended to be the proposed extension of CR 39. Instead, Stephen Hands Path becomes a Town of East Hampton road and continues northeast towards Hands Creek Road, while CR 113 moves north onto Old Northwest Road only for the north end to terminate at Cedar Street, while Old Northwest Road continues towards Northwest Harbor.

Major intersections

Location	mi	km	Destinations	Notes
Village of East Hampton	0.0	0.0	NY 27 (Montauk Highway)	
Village of East Hampton	1.4	2.3	NY 114 – East Hampton, Sag Harbor	Former hamlet of Hardscrabble
East Hampton North	1.8	2.9	Long Lane (CR 59 south)	Northern terminus of CR 59
Northwest Harbor	2.2	3.5	Cedar Street / Old Northwest Road – Cedar Point Park	
1.000 mi = 1.609 km; 1.000 km = 0.621 mi

== County Route 115 ==
County Route 115
- Location: Shelter Island Heights
- Length: 0.56 mi (900 m)
- Existed: 1982–present

County Route 115 is West Neck Road in the hamlet of Shelter Island Heights on Shelter Island. The route begins at Shore Road (Nostrand and Brander parkways) and Bootlegger's Alley. At Worth Way, the road turns northeast and after the intersection with Westmoreland Road runs along the North shore of West Neck Bay. The shoreline of the bay ends just before the intersection of Hilo Drive. CR 115 briefly turns north and intersects CR 42, where the road turns east again along the southern border of the Shelter Island Country Club. The country club ends at the intersection with New York Avenue and CR 116. After intersecting a dead end street, the road becomes the northern terminus of Midway Road before finally terminating itself at a wye intersection with NY 114. CR 115 was previously designated as CR 28.

== County Route 116 ==
County Route 116
- Location: Shelter Island Heights–Shelter Island
- Length: 1.18 mi (1.90 km)
- Existed: 1982–present

County Route 116 is a pair of two-lane roads on Shelter Island. It begins at CR 115 in Shelter Island Heights on Menantic Road. Halfway between CR 115 and the south shore of Shelter Island, CR 116 runs along the east side of West Neck Bay and West Neck Creek, then turns east onto Smith Street, From here it runs close to the north shore of Menatic Creek, then intersects Midway Road. The road intersects four more streets in "downtown" Shelter Island before finally terminating at NY 114. Previously, the route was known as CR 29.

== County Route 117 ==
County Route 117
- Location: Shelter Island
- Length: 0.45 mi (720 m)
- Existed: 1982–present

County Route 117 runs along Burns Road on Shelter Island. Previously, the road was designated as CR 30. Though not the shortest county road in Suffolk County (this status belongs to CR 81), the road spans a mere 0.45 miles from part of former CR 37 (Saint Mary's Road) to CR 69 (Cartwright Road). Burns Road continues east of the terminus of CR 69 to the west shore of Coecles Inlet.
