= List of county routes in Suffolk County, New York (76–100) =

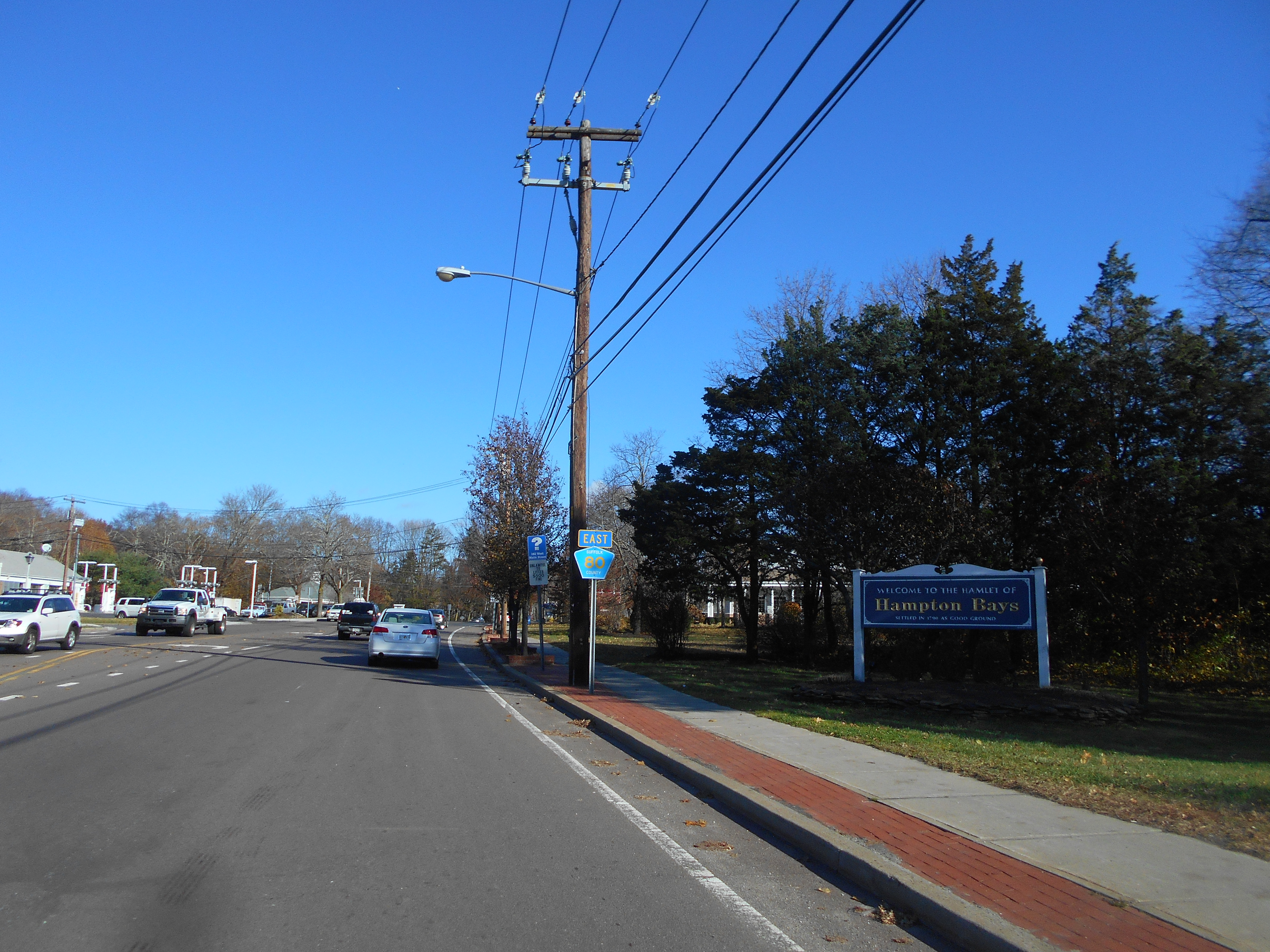
- Standard route marker for county routes in Suffolk County; CR 80 eastbound, entering Hampton Bays

Highway names
- Interstates: Interstate X (I-X)
- US Highways: U.S. Route X (US X)
- State: New York State Route X (NY X)
- County: County Route X (CR X)

System links
- New York Highways; Interstate; US; State; Reference; Parkways

County routes in Suffolk County, New York, are maintained by the Suffolk County Department of Public Works and signed with the Manual on Uniform Traffic Control Devices-standard yellow-on-blue pentagon route marker. The designations do not follow any fixed pattern. Routes 76 to 100 are listed below.

== County Route 76 ==
County Route 76
- Location: Hauppauge–Nesconset
- Length: 3.2 mi (5.1 km)
- Existed: 1946–present

County Route 76 is Town Line Road along the Islip–Smithtown township line. Until 1968, it was also part of Veterans Memorial Highway from Jericho Turnpike in Commack to Nesconset Highway in Hauppauge. The road shares a short concurrency with NY 111 in Hauppauge. An eastern extension to CR 16 was proposed at one time. The official Suffolk County Department of Public Works listing of county roads still includes this formerly proposed extension.

Major intersections

| Location | mi | km | Destinations | Notes |
|---|---|---|---|---|
| Hauppauge | 0.00 | 0.00 | NY 347 | No access from NY 347 west to CR 76 east |
| Hauppauge | 0.40 | 0.64 | NY 111 south | Southern terminus of concurrency with NY 111 |
| Hauppauge | 0.50 | 0.80 | NY 111 north to NY 347 | Northern terminus of concurrency with NY 111 |
| Nesconset | 3.20 | 5.15 | Nichols Road to I-495 / CR 16 – Smithtown, Islip | |
1.000 mi = 1.609 km; 1.000 km = 0.621 mi: Concurrency terminus; Incomplete access

== County Route 77 ==
County Route 77
- Location: Montauk
- Length: 3.05 mi (4.91 km)
- Existed: 1946–present

County Route 77 is the north-south road along the west side of Lake Montauk. It begins at an at-grade interchange of Montauk Point State Parkway as West Lake Drive where it intersects two streets that lead to the east side of Montauk Downs State Park, until it reaches CR 70. From here the road runs much closer to Lake Montauk, then intersects with other roads such as Star Island Road to the right, and then East Flamingo Road (former CR 95) to the left.

Before the road reaches the Block Island Sound, it intersects with the northern terminus of CR 49. The road then takes a sharp right turn along the sound then loops around in the opposite direction and passes by the ferry port to Block Island, before returning to the intersection with CR 49.

Major intersections

The entire route is in Montauk.

| mi | km | Destinations | Notes |
|---|---|---|---|
| 0.00 | 0.00 | NY 27 (Montauk Point State Parkway) | |
| 0.70 | 1.13 | CR 70 east (Old West Lake Drive) | Former CR 77A; western terminus of CR 70 |
| 1.90 | 3.06 | East Flamingo Avenue | Formerly CR 95, later a former section of CR 49 |
| 2.30 | 3.70 | CR 49 south (Flamingo Avenue) | Northern terminus of CR 49 |
| 3.05 | 4.91 | CR 49 south (Flamingo Avenue) | CR 77 loops back to the northern terminus of CR 49 |
1.000 mi = 1.609 km; 1.000 km = 0.621 mi

== County Route 77A ==
County Route 77A
- Location: Montauk–Ditch Plains
- Length: 0.93 mi (1,500 m)
- Existed: c. 1954

County Route 77A was the former east wye of CR 77 leading east towards Montauk Point State Parkway. Today it is CR 70.

== County Route 77B ==
County Route 77B
- Location: Ditch Plains–Montauk
- Existed: c. 1952

County Route 77B was the former west wye of CR 77 leading east towards Montauk Point State Parkway. Today it is part of CR 77.

== County Route 78 ==
County Route 78
- Location: Bayport–Patchogue
- Length: 1.2 mi (1.9 km)
- Existed: 1946–present

County Route 78 is Church Street in the southeastern part of the town of Islip, from NY 27 to Division Avenue in Patchogue. Originally, it was also Veterans Memorial Highway from Nesconset to Sunrise highways until it was extended westward towards Jericho Turnpike in Commack in 1968, replacing part of CR 76. The southeast end of Veterans Memorial Highway bisected Church Street at Sunrise Highway, but only the part of Church Street on the south side of Sunrise Highway was a county road. The north side has never been anything else but a road maintained by the town of Islip. In 1972, Veterans Highway was acquired by the New York State Department of Transportation and designated NY 454, but Church Street remained CR 78.

Major intersections

| Location | mi | km | Destinations | Notes |
|---|---|---|---|---|
| Bayport | 0.00 | 0.00 | To NY 27 east (Sunrise Highway) | Access via eastbound service road |
| Bayport | 0.80 | 1.29 | CR 97 (Nicolls Road) | At-grade intersection |
| Patchogue | 1.20 | 1.93 | Division Avenue / Park Avenue east | |
1.000 mi = 1.609 km; 1.000 km = 0.621 mi

== County Route 79 ==
County Route 79
- Location: Bridgehampton–Sag Harbor
- Length: 4.6 mi (7.4 km)
- Existed: 1948–present

County Route 79 is a north-south two-lane road, known as the Bridgehampton–Sag Harbor Turnpike.

=== History ===
Known in pre-colonial times as the "Cart Path to Great Meadows," it was replaced by the Bull Head Turnpike Company as a private toll road, called the "Sag Harbor and Bull's Head Turnpike." Construction began in 1834 and the turnpike opened on March 29, 1837. The toll company shut down in 1905, and the toll houses were torn down in 1909. The road was acquired by Suffolk County on November 10, 1948.

=== Major intersections ===
| Location | mi | km | Destinations | Notes |
|---|---|---|---|---|
| Bridgehampton | 0.00 | 0.00 | NY 27 (Main Street) / Ocean Road south | Continues south without designation |
| Sag Harbor | 3.70 | 5.95 | Brick Kiln Road | Former CR 38 |
| Sag Harbor | 4.60 | 7.40 | NY 114 (Bay Street) / Wharf Street north (CR 81) | Southern terminus of CR 81 |
1.000 mi = 1.609 km; 1.000 km = 0.621 mi

== County Route 79A ==
County Route 79A
- Location: Sag Harbor
- Length: 0.28 mi (450 m)
- Existed: 1952–1980s

County Route 79A was Main Street in Sag Harbor. It was established on October 23, 1952 and merged into CR 79 after the 1960s.

== County Route 80 ==
County Route 80
- Location: East Patchogue–Shinnecock Hills

County Route 80 is the county route designation used for Montauk Highway (also labeled as Main Street, East Main Street and West Main Street) between East Patchogue and Shinnecock Hills.

== County Route 80 Truck ==
CR 80 Truck
- Location: Moriches; Eastport–Speonk

Two Truck routes of County Route 80 exist in two locations. The first is in Moriches on Old Neck Road and Wilcox Avenue leading trucks around a low bridge beneath the Long Island Rail Road Montauk Branch. The second includes North Bay Avenue in Eastport, New York, which leads truck drivers from another low bridge for the same line within the community, then turns right overlapping Old Country Road into Speonk, where it turns south on North Phillips Avenue and ends at Montauk Highway just south of the Speonk (LIRR station). The latter of these was originally designated as New York State Route 27 Truck, when New York State Route 27 was part of Montauk Highway between Exits 61 and 65 on Sunrise Highway.

== County Route 81 ==
County Route 81
- Location: Sag Harbor
- Length: 0.15 mi (240 m)
- Existed: 1949–present

County Route 81 is the shortest county road in Suffolk County. Known as Wharf Street, the road consists entirely of a 0.15-mile (0.24 km) segment of the former Sag Harbor Branch of the Long Island Rail Road. It runs from an intersection with NY 114 (Bay Street) to the end of the pier on Gardiners Bay. The Sag Harbor Branch was abandoned in 1940, and the road was established in 1949. It is not signed.

== County Route 82 ==
County Route 82
- Location: West Islip
- Length: 3.0 mi (4.8 km)
- Existed: 1949–present

County Route 82 is the designation for Higbie Lane from its starting point to Udall Road, and for most of Udall Road. It was named for the Richard Udall family who had an estate on South Country Road (now Montauk Highway). Higbie Lane starts as a two lane divided highway with a U-turn at NY 27A (Montauk Highway), between the historic La Grange Inn and the West Islip Public Library, and instantly becomes a two-lane undivided highway with a center-left-turn lane. Heading north, CR 82 intersect CR 50, immediately followed by an at-grade crossing of the Long Island Rail Road Montauk Branch near the Babylon Yard for the Babylon station, and then serves the west end of West Islip Boulevard, which runs along the north side of the tracks and becomes Orinoco Drive.

The route shifts to the northeast at a former wye onto Udall's Road, and Higbie Lane becomes a town of Islip maintained road. As Udall Road, CR 82 passes through another semi-residential area and then runs underneath the underpass of NY 27 between exits 40 and 41. The next moderate intersection is with Hunter Avenue and Muncey Road. Together these roads span from CR 34 to CR 57 between Sunrise Highway and the Southern State Parkway. CR 82 runs over the Southern State Parkway, but has no access to the parkway. The route finally ends at CR 57, however while CR 82 ends there, Udall Road continues as a town of Islip road towards Howell's Road, which leads to Corbin Avenue and eventually to the Deer Park station.

Major intersections

The entire route is in West Islip.

| mi | km | Destinations | Notes |
|---|---|---|---|
| 0.00 | 0.00 | NY 27A (Montauk Highway) | |
| 0.70 | 1.13 | CR 50 (Union Boulevard) | |
| 1.70 | 2.74 | To NY 27 | Access via service roads between exits 40 and 41 |
| 3.00 | 4.83 | CR 57 (Bay Shore Road) | |
1.000 mi = 1.609 km; 1.000 km = 0.621 mi

== County Route 83 ==
County Route 83
- Location: Brookhaven

County Route 83 is a major county road within the town of Brookhaven. It runs north and south from NY 27 (Sunrise Highway) at exit 52A in North Patchogue to NY 25A in Mount Sinai.

== County Route 83A ==
County Route 83A
- Location: Mount Sinai

County Route 83A was a formerly proposed spur that was intended to run from an unbuilt segment of CR 83 to Cedar Beach in Mount Sinai. It was supposed to run northwest, parallel to Pipe Stave Hollow Road, and end at Cedar Beach Town Park.

== County Route 84 ==
County Route 84
- Location: Mattituck–East Mattituck
- Length: 2.58 mi (4.15 km)
- Existed: 1950–1980s

County Route 84 was a road that looped around northern Mattituck. This road included a bridge over Mattituck Creek that no longer exists. It began as Cox Neck Road on Sound Avenue, just west of the western terminus of what is today CR 48 (Middle Road). It had only one street even remotely resembling a major intersection, Bergen Avenue. The road takes a sharp right turn and heads east where it used to cross over Mattituck Creek. On the east side of Mattituck Creek, the road was Mill Neck Road. As Mill Neck Road became Oregon Avenue in Oregon, CR 84 turned south on Mill Road, where it crossed former CR 27A then CR 48 and headed back to NY 25 near East Mattituck.

== County Route 85 ==
County Route 85
- Location: Oakdale–Patchogue

County Route 85 is Montauk Highway between the Oakdale Merge and Patchogue.

== County Route 86 ==
County Route 86
- Location: South Huntington–Centerport
- Length: 3.85 mi (6.20 km)
- Existed: 1951–present

County Route 86 runs from NY 25 and Dix Hills Road as Broadway–Greenlawn and Centerport Road into Little Neck Road in Centerport.

Route description

CR 86 begins at the intersection of NY 25 and Dix Hills Road and at first runs northeast to southwest and immediately curves to a more northerly direction before the intersection of CR 35. Just northeast of Lekamb Avenue, the road straightens out, briefly moving direct north. This change is short-lived as it heads back northeast at Lantern Street. After passing two T-intersections connecting CR 86 to separate parts of Delamere Street, the road passes along the west side of a former apple grove that is now part of the Manor Plains Nature Park, a preserved land that is bisected by an L-shaped residential street which ends at Manor Road, a road which runs parallel to CR 86. Residences do turn up again on the east side north of the intersection with Leigh Street on the west side. Parkland turns up again on the same side just south of the opposite side of the intersection with Depew Street, only to end again at a local dog kennel. What passes for a major intersection at this point is Little Plains Road, which is also part of New York State Bicycle Route 25A.

The heart of Greenlawn is reached at the intersection of CR 9, the northwest corner of which contains Greenlawn Park, a local baseball field that runs along. The park is located along the west side of Broadway, east side of Cuba Hill Road, and south side of CR 11 (Pulaski Road), which it intersects almost instantly. Further into town, CR 86 passes an at-grade railroad crossing of the Port Jefferson Branch of the Long Island Rail Road close to Greenlawn Railroad Station. After passing the Harborfields Public Library, the road becomes much more residential. It curves to the left as it moves down the hills approaching the north shore, then makes a sharp curve to the northeast before the intersection with NY 25A at the Suydam Homestead.

History

The road was once planned to be replaced by a four-lane divided highway known as CR 107, which would've extended it down towards Belmont Lake State Park and West Babylon.

Major intersections

| Location | mi | km | Destinations | Notes |
|---|---|---|---|---|
| South Huntington | 0.00 | 0.00 | NY 25 (Jericho Turnpike) / Dix Hills Road | |
| Dix Hills | 0.30 | 0.48 | CR 35 (Park Avenue) | |
| Greenlawn | 1.90 | 3.06 | CR 9 (Cuba Hill Road) | |
| Greenlawn | 2.10 | 3.38 | CR 11 (Pulaski Road) | |
| Centerport | 3.60 | 5.79 | Center Shore Road to NY 25A west | No access from Center Shore Road south to CR 86 south |
| Centerport | 3.85 | 6.20 | NY 25A east (Main Street) / Little Neck Road north | No northbound left turn to NY 25A west |
1.000 mi = 1.609 km; 1.000 km = 0.621 mi: Incomplete access

== County Route 87 ==
County Route 87
- Location: Smithtown–Saint James
- Length: 2.16 mi (3.48 km)
- Existed: 1952–present

County Route 87 is an unsigned county route on two-lane Edgewood Ave, which may have been part of NY 25A. The road runs southwest to northeast north of the Port Jefferson Branch of the Long Island Rail Road, and is inventoried as a west-to-east road.

Route description

The road begins at the NY 25–NY 25A overlap in western Smithtown, at the north end of Brooksite Drive. Besides running north of the LIRR Port Jefferson Line, it also runs south of the Nissequogue River until it reaches Nissequogue River Road. Prior to this point, the road curves at a more easterly direction before the intersection of Landing Avenue. After passing by some surviving farmland as well as a middle school, the road enters the southernmost portion of the village of Head of the Harbor where it intersects Fifty Acre Road before ending at NY 25A in St. James.

Major intersections

| Location | mi | km | Destinations | Notes |
|---|---|---|---|---|
| Hamlet of Smithtown | 0.00 | 0.00 | NY 25 / NY 25A (Main Street) | |
| Saint James | 2.16 | 3.48 | NY 25A (North Country Road) | |
1.000 mi = 1.609 km; 1.000 km = 0.621 mi

== County Route 88 ==
County Route 88
- Location: Speonk–Northampton
- Length: 3.9 mi (6.3 km)
- Existed: 1974–present

County Route 88 is a two-lane highway known as Speonk–Riverhead Road, however the road doesn't go as far north as Riverhead as it originally did. The county describes the distance as being "3.8+ miles." The road terminates at the northeast corner of the Eastern Campus of Suffolk County Community College.

Route description

CR 88 begins at CR 71 (Old Country Road) in Speonk, just east of Phillips Avenue, which serves as both a truck detour for County Route 80 (Suffolk County, New York), and as the road to Speonk's Long Island Railroad station. It was once planned to cross under the Port Jefferson–Westhampton Beach Highway.

Most of the road continues through a section of the Long Island Central Pine Barrens, which feature the indigenous dwarf pine. This area fell victim to a widespread wildfire that burned a significant portion of the core of the Pine Barrens in 1995. Halfway along its existence, the road serves as an overpass for NY 27, but does not have an interchange with it. After the road runs along the SCC Eastern Campus, CR 88 ends at CR 51 (East Moriches–Riverhead Road) in Northampton. The former section that actually got close to Riverhead is now only a dirt trail whose name only exists on paper.

Major intersections

| Location | mi | km | Destinations | Notes |
|---|---|---|---|---|
| Speonk | 0.00 | 0.00 | Old Country Road (CR 71) | |
| Speonk | 1.70 | 2.74 | NY 27 (Sunrise Highway) | Proposed exit 62A |
| Northampton | 3.90 | 6.28 | CR 51 | Serves Suffolk County Community College |
1.000 mi = 1.609 km; 1.000 km = 0.621 mi: Unopened

== County Route 89 ==
County Route 89
- Location: West Hampton Dunes–Hampton Bays
- Length: 14.0 mi (22.5 km)
- Existed: 1953–present

County Route 89, better known as Dune Road, spans the Southampton segment of Fire Island from the east side of Cupsogue Beach County Park at Moriches Inlet to the Shinnecock Inlet. It begins east of Moriches Inlet at Cupsogue Beach County Park, and crosses the Brookhaven–Southampton town line in West Hampton Dunes, which is almost entirely line with residential beach houses and the occasional private roads, with the exception of Pike's Beach town Park. Even after leaving the village, CR 89 continues to maintain these characteristics, but occasionally features random beach clubs, recreational areas, and another town of Westhampton Beach named Lashley Beach

Moriches Bay ends on the north side of the street, and flows into Moneybogue Bay, which runs under the Jessup Lane Bridge in Westhampton Beach across from the Swordfish Beach Club. This is the first connection to the rest of Long Island. In between the segment along Moneybogue Bay, the residential beach houses continue to line the road, but more of them are surrounded by shrubs and small trees.

The bay flows into the much narrower Quantuck Creek, which runs under Beach Lane Bridge which is also in Westhampton Beach across from Rogers Beach. The pattern of beach houses blocked by greenery continues, but primarily along the Atlantic Ocean side of the road. When Quantuck Creek flows into Quantuck Bay, the houses are more abundant. Here the road also passes by the Quantuck Beach Club, which despite being located on the south side of the road, has a parking lot on the north side.

The road enters the village of Quogue just before the intersection of Water's Edge Road. The next intersection is Watersedge Drive, which ends where Quantuck Bay flows into the Quogue Canal. Within this area, CR 89 passes the Surf Beach Club of Quogue, and then encounters its only major intersection, a wye intersection at the Post Lane Bridge which crosses the canal is the only access to the rest of Long Island in Quogue. Shortly after the bridge, the road passes the Quogue Beach Club.

While the south side of the road continues the pattern of private beach houses, most of the land on the north side of the road is undeveloped marshland, especially as Quogue Canal opens up into Shinnecock Bay. This pattern continues east of the village line. East of Dockers Waterside Restaurant, the north side of the road contains marshland that is so low, that satellite views make it appear as if the road runs along the bay itself.

At the intersection of Dolphin Lane, the northern portion of which terminates just out of reach of Sedge Island, CR 89 serves as the terminus of another unpaved and unnamed road that would provide easier access to that island. This is soon overshadowed by a clister of residential streets on the south side, known as A Road, Road C, and Road D. A few Road B's can be found within that cluster, but none intersect with Dune Road. Northside marshland becomes more solid on another unnamed dirt road a block west of Triton Lane. East of here, the Shinnecock Bay resumes its domination of the north side of the road, with only a brief interruption of land. However, sparse north side residences begin turning up again across the street from the Hampton Ocean Resort, and soon after intersecting Mermaid Lane, Neptune Beach Club.

Further east along the bay the road enters Shinnecock Inlet County Park. The few intersections in this area are K Road and later Road K. The next intersection, however is for the Ponquogue Bridge in Ponquogue, which provides the last access point to the rest of Long Island. Parallel to this is an intersection with Beach Road, which leads to the former Ponquogue Bridge, now serving as a fishing pier. Both the former and current bridges are across from Ponquogue Beach. One more intersection with Road I can be found east of there before the road prepares to conclude near a series of restaurants and marinas on the north side. The last intersection is Road H, which is a dead end street at both ends, and the road ends at Shinnecock Inlet at a parking lot along the inlet with a light tower on the south end.

Major intersections

| Location | mi | km | Destinations | Notes |
|---|---|---|---|---|
| West Hampton Dunes | 0.00 | 0.00 | Cupsogue Beach County Park | Moriches Inlet |
| Westhampton Beach | 4.70 | 7.56 | Jessup Lane north | To CR 31 |
| Westhampton Beach | 5.70 | 9.17 | Beach Lane north | To CR 71 |
| Hampton Bays | 13.00 | 20.92 | Ponquogue Bridge north (CR 32) – Ponquogue | Southern terminus of CR 32 |
| Hampton Bays | 14.00 | 22.53 | Charles F. Altenkirch Shinnecock Inlet County Park | Shinnecock Inlet |
1.000 mi = 1.609 km; 1.000 km = 0.621 mi

== County Route 90 ==
County Route 90
- Location: Holtsville–Medford
- Length: 5.2 mi (8.4 km)
- Existed: 1966–present

County Route 90 is a pair of unsigned county roads (Furrows Road and Peconic Avenue) that were planned as a Central Suffolk Highway, the second part of a proposed reconnection of the two segments of NY 24.

History

Suffolk County Department of Public Works added CR 90 to the system on October 10, 1966, and officially describes the road as follows;

Beginning at C.R. 93, Lakeland Avenue–Ocean Avenue in the town of Islip, about 600 feet south of the Long Island Railroad(sic); thence easterly in general parallel to the Long Island Railroad to the vicinity of Knickerbocker Avenue; thence to Furrows Road in the vicinity of Lincoln Avenue; thence easterly along or in the vicinity of Barrett's Avenue to C.R. 83, Patchogue–Mt. Sinai Road(sic) at or in the vicinity of Peconic Avenue to C.R. 16, Horseblock Road(sic), a distance of 4.3 miles in the town of Islip, and 4.2 miles in the town of Brookhaven, a total distance of 8.5 miles.

Reality has proven a much more ambitious proposal for CR 90. From the interchange with CR 97 (Nicolls Road) to Waverly Avenue (unsigned CR 61), the right-of-way for separate westbound lanes has existed since the 1970s. Beyond Horse Block Road, the unbuilt ROW for the Central Suffolk Highway can be found beneath the CR 101 bridge over the LIRR Main Line. Road maps published between the 1960s and 1980s show a proposed road labeled CR 90 between Moriches–Middle Island Road at North Street and CR 111 at Hot Water Street, the very location where other maps indicate that the proposed western extension of CR 105 was intended to terminate.

CR 90 was neither built according to its official description, nor to its ultimate proposal. The only segments that originally existed when the route was designated are Furrows Road between Lincoln Avenue and Waverly Avenue, and Peconic Avenue between CR 83 and CR 16. Barrett's Avenue is a town of Brookhaven residential dead end street extending east of Waverly Avenue, however it does provide a connection to CR 83 via Old Fish Road, a segment of the former Fish Thicket Road which is a local road dating back to the American Revolution.

Segments that could've been part of the proposed CR 90 include a four-lane dead end highway near the Suffolk County Police Department headquarters on CR 21 in Yaphank built during the 1970s, and a segment of Railroad Avenue South between CR 29 and Knickerbocker Avenue built during the 1980s as part of the major reconstruction of Ronkonkoma Railroad Station.

Major intersections

| Location | mi | km | Destinations | Notes |
|---|---|---|---|---|
| Holbrook | 0.00 | 0.00 | Lincoln Avenue | |
| Holbrook | 0.70 | 1.13 | Main Street (CR 19A) | Former routing of CR 19 |
| Holbrook | 0.80 | 1.29 | CR 19 (Patchogue–Holbrook Road) | |
| Holtsville | 1.80 | 2.90 | CR 97 (Nicolls Road) | Partial cloverleaf interchange |
| Holtsville | 2.30 | 3.70 | Waverly Avenue (CR 61) / Barretts Avenue east | Continues east without designation |
Gap in designation
| Medford | 0.00 | 0.00 | CR 83 (North Ocean Avenue) | |
| Medford | 0.40 | 0.64 | Old Medford Avenue | |
| Medford | 1.00 | 1.61 | NY 112 | |
| Medford | 2.90 | 4.67 | CR 16 (Horseblock Road) | No eastbound access to CR 16 west |
1.000 mi = 1.609 km; 1.000 km = 0.621 mi: Incomplete access

== County Route 91 ==
County Route 91
- Location: Manorville–Eastport

County Route 91 was reserved for the formerly proposed Manorville Branch Road which was to be built on the aptly named former Manorville Branch of the Long Island Rail Road. The proposal was cancelled in 1988.

== County Route 92 ==
County Route 92
- Location: West Hills–Huntington
- Length: 2.89 mi (4.65 km)
- Existed: 1954–present

County Route 92 is Oakwood Road, the most westerly county road in Huntington township. It begins at NY 25 (Jericho Turnpike) in West Hills, east of the intersection of Sweet Hollow Road, which runs through West Hills County Park before heading south to CR 3. Though described as a two-lane road, it often provides a center-left turn lane that isn't necessarily continuous. Motorists are left with no doubt that they're in Huntington Manor when CR 92 runs along the east side of Oakwood Park, near the southwest corner of the grade crossing with the Port Jefferson Branch of the Long Island Rail Road, and immediately intersects 11th Street, which serves as the southern end of the multiplex with New York State Bicycle Route 25A. As the area returns to becoming more residential, the barely noticeable multiplex ends at the intersection of CR 11 (Pulaski Road).

North of CR 11, CR 92 runs between NY 108 and NY 110. A former segment of the road can be found on the east side between Jefferson Elementary School and north of Waywood Place. This segment is now a residential frontage road. After passing this segment the road curves to the northeast as it passes later a high school athletic field, and begins to move closer to NY 110. It begins to descend along the hills of the North Shore of Long Island as it curves back north again between Holdsworth Drive and Semon Road. Upon running back to its more northerly destination, the road first passing by a Suffolk County Department of Public Works building and the Huntington Highway Department, and then along the Western edge of Huntington Rural Cemetery. In the opposite direction, a southbound hill-climbing lane exists between Finch Place and the previously mentioned high school athletic field.

As the road approaches High Street, Oakwood Road becomes Green Street, but CR 92 uses the turning ramp onto High Street to turn east, and serves as the beginning of the end for the county road. CR 92 ends at the David Conklin Farmhouse on the southwest corner of NY 110 three blocks south of the intersection of NY 25A. High Street turns into Fairview Street which continues east into Nassau Road.

Major intersections

| Location | mi | km | Destinations | Notes |
|---|---|---|---|---|
| West Hills | 0.0 | 0.0 | NY 25 | |
| Huntington Manor | | | CR 11 | |
| Hamlet of Huntington | | | High Street | |
| Hamlet of Huntington | | | NY 110 | Continues east as Fairview Street |
1.000 mi = 1.609 km; 1.000 km = 0.621 mi

== County Route 93 ==
County Route 93
- Location: Sayville–Lake Ronkonkoma
- Length: 5.48 mi (8.82 km)
- Existed: 1955–present

County Route 93 is a major county road within central Suffolk County, primarily in the eastern part of the town of Islip and partially in the southeastern section of the town of Smithtown. It runs north and south from NY 27 in Bohemia near Sayville to CR 16 in Lake Ronkonkoma. Names of the route include Lakeland Avenue, Ocean Avenue, and Rosevale Avenue.

Route description

Lakeland Avenue actually begins at CR 85 in Sayville as Railroad Avenue and leaves downtown Sayville at a northwesterly direction. Among the locations within this section are Sayville's train station, Johnson Avenue, Tariff Street, and the abandoned Island Hills Golf and Country Club. Only when Lakeland Avenue encounters the interchange with NY 27 at exit 49 does the road acquire its designation as CR 93. This segment was the first to be widened from two to four lanes. Between the intersections of NY 454 and Smithtown Avenue (unsigned CR 29), one can find the end of runway #6 for the Long Island MacArthur Airport. At the intersection with Pond Road and Locust Avenue, CR 93 enters the Pond Road Business District, an industrialized section of Pond Road. Pond Road once stretched from Lake Ronkonkoma to Oakdale, near what is today the Oakdale Merge at Sunrise and Montauk highways.

Lakeland Avenue terminates at the at-grade interchange with Ocean Avenue, and CR 93 becomes Ocean Avenue north of there. South of the interchange, Ocean Avenue once went as far south as Montauk Highway, then was rerouted toward Locust Avenue by developers and in recent years was terminated at the westbound service road of Sunrise Highway. North of the interchange the last section to be widened was between Peconic Street and Johnson Avenue due partially to the crossing of the Ronkonkoma Branch of the Long Island Rail Road. The southwest corner of Ocean and Johnson avenues was the original site of Lakeland's LIRR station. North of there, CR 93 crosses I-495 at exit 59, and then the Long Island Power Authority power line right of way. At the intersection of Woodlawn Avenue and Ontario Street, Ocean Avenue curves to the right and starts to go downhill as it approaches Lake Ronkonkoma.

Ocean Avenue terminates at the at-grade interchange with Rosevale Avenue, and then CR 93 head northwest along Rosevale Avenue, around the western edge of Lake Ronkonkoma. Rosevale Avenue extends east as a town of Islip street, where it becomes Church Street as it crosses the Islip–Brookhaven town line. After passing by a town of Islip Beach for the lake, CR 93 dips towards the Vanderbilt Motor Parkway. The eastern terminus of Vanderbilt Motor Parkway was truncated at CR 93. Originally intended to be extended towards the Hamptons, possibly using Rosevale Avenue as a segment, Vanderbilt Motor Parkway was stopped at the former Petit Trianon Hotel, which Rosevale originally ran through the western edge of, and was burned down in 1968. After the Motor Parkway intersection, and the nearby intersection with Central Islip Boulevard, CR 93 climbs back up another hill as it approaches Richmond Boulevard, which leads to Old Nichol's Road. Just as the road crosses the Islip–Smithtown town line, it finally terminates at CR 16 (Smithtown Boulevard) in Lake Ronkonkoma. Work was done recently to eliminate the two separate intersections at the terminus of CR 93; formerly Gibbs Pond Road intersected CR 16 just east of CR 93, but these intersections have been made into one by using the property on which an abandoned building once stood.

Major intersections

| Location | mi | km | Destinations | Notes |
|---|---|---|---|---|
| Bohemia–Sayville line | 0.00 | 0.00 | NY 27 | Exit 49 on NY 27 |
| Ronkonkoma | 1.92 | 3.09 | NY 454 (Veterans Memorial Highway) | |
| Ronkonkoma | 2.14 | 3.44 | CR 29 north (Smithtown Avenue) | Southern terminus of CR 29 |
| Ronkonkoma | 3.82– 3.92 | 6.15– 6.31 | I-495 | Exit 59 on CR 93 |
| Ronkonkoma | 4.80 | 7.72 | CR 67 west (Long Island Motor Parkway) | Eastern terminus of CR 67 |
| Lake Ronkonkoma | 5.48 | 8.82 | CR 16 (Smithtown Boulevard) | |
1.000 mi = 1.609 km; 1.000 km = 0.621 mi

== County Route 94 ==
County Route 94
- Location: Calverton–Riverhead

County Route 94 overlaps NY 24 between I-495 and CR 104, but was intended to be extended north and then west into Wading River.

== County Route 94A ==
County Route 94A
- Location: Riverhead

County Route 94A is Center Drive Spur, a four-lane highway that crosses the Peconic River between NY 24 and CR 94 and West Main Street (NY 25) and Court Street.

== County Route 95 ==
County Route 95
- Location: West Babylon–Melville
- Length: 4.92 mi (7.92 km)
- Existed: 1973–present

County Route 95 is mainly Little East Neck Road north of NY 109 in West Babylon. Little East Neck Road runs northwest to southeast and begins as part of the west-to-east NY 109. However, when NY 109 moves in a more westerly direction onto the Babylon–Farmingdale Turnpike, the road becomes CR 95. The first major intersection along this road is the northeast to southwest unmarked CR 107 (Belmont Avenue). Four blocks later both roads go over NY 27, and share exit 38.

Although it crosses over Southern State Parkway, it provides no access. However it marks the west end of a section of the parkway that gets a widened pine tree-lined median before it approaches Belmont Lake State Park. The road runs through another residential area before it approaches the eastern terminus of Edison Avenue and Hilltop Avenue, where it approaches a green strip leading southeast towards the Southern State Parkway as it intersects County Road 2 (Straight Path). Further north, the road runs along the eastern end of Wellwood Cemetery, and some private land abutting Beth Moses Cemetery and Colonial Springs Golf Course, both of which are across from Wyandanch Memorial High School. Two blocks north of the high school is an intersection with Long Island Avenue, on the south side of the at-grade crossing of the Ronkonkoma Branch of the Long Island Rail Road and then runs through Pinelawn Cemetery. On the east side of the road Pinelawn Cemetery ends at Colonial Springs Park, and on the west side it ends less than a block north at Long Island National Cemetery, which dominates the entire west side of the road until it ends.

Little East Neck Road terminates at Colonial Springs Road, although at one time it extended much further north. Due to the terminus, of Little East Neck Road, CR 95 moves to the northwest onto Colonial Springs Road, and continues to serve as the eastern edge of LI National Cemetery. CR 95 terminates at the intersection of CR 3 (Pinelawn Road) in Melville, and turns southwest into CR 5. At one time, however it turned into Bayliss Road and continued to the northwest towards Walt Whitman Road (former NY 110).

Major intersections

| Location | mi | km | Destinations | Notes |
|---|---|---|---|---|
| West Babylon | 0.0 | 0.0 | NY 109 | |
| West Babylon | | | CR 107 | |
| West Babylon | | | NY 27 | Part of exit 38 (Sunrise Highway) |
| Wyandanch | | | CR 2 | |
| Melville | | | CR 3 / CR 5 | |
1.000 mi = 1.609 km; 1.000 km = 0.621 mi

== County Route 96 ==
County Route 96
- Location: West Babylon
- Length: 2.01 mi (3.23 km)
- Existed: 1958–present

County Route 96 is Great East Neck Road just south of the southern terminus of CR 95. The designation was established on February 2, 1958 and extended along Bergen Avenue on December 8, 1970, where it dead ends at the Bergen County Golf Course on South Oyster Bay.

Major intersections

The entire route is in West Babylon, Suffolk County.

| mi | km | Destinations | Notes |
|---|---|---|---|
| 0.0 | 0.0 | Bergen Point County Golf Course | |
| | | NY 27A | |
| | | CR 12 | |
| | | NY 109 | |
1.000 mi = 1.609 km; 1.000 km = 0.621 mi

== County Route 97 ==
County Route 97
- Location: Bayport–Stony Brook

County Route 97 is a major county road which is a partially limited-access road that runs north and south from CR 85 (Montauk Highway) on the border of Bayport and Blue Point to NY 25A in Stony Brook.

== County Route 98 ==
County Route 98
- Location: Moriches-East Moriches
- Length: 5.05 mi (8.13 km)
- Existed: 1958–present

County Route 98 is a road running east and west from CR 80 in Moriches to CR 80 in East Moriches. The road goes under two names; Frowein Road and the Moriches Bypass.

History

Frowein Road has always been only two-lanes wide, but three years after being designated a county road in 1958, it was given additional right-of-ways for widening, as well as an at-grade interchange on the west end. Plans for upgrading the road as a bypass go as far back as the 1930s. The at-grade interchange also includes access to Moriches–Middle Island Road, a historic Long Island road that leads to CR 21 (Rocky Point–Yaphank Road). In addition, Suffolk County had planned to realign CR 25 from this interchange north through exit 69 on the Long Island Expressway. The proposed widening of the Moriches Bypass was also to include a section of Montauk Highway from the east end of Frowein Road into downtown Eastport. Due to fiscal concerns, and a general atmosphere of opposition to road improvements, this proposal was never implemented.

Just as Montauk Highway was realigned along the north side of the Montauk Branch of the Long Island Rail Road between East Patchogue and Brookhaven to divert through traffic away from Historic Bellport, Frowein Road was transformed into the Moriches Bypass, partially to divert truck traffic and through traffic away from historic sections of Moriches, Center Moriches, and East Moriches, as well as the low railroad bridges in Moriches and East Moriches. Since the road runs along the north side of the LIRR tracks, it served as a more convenient route to Center Moriches Station until the Long Island Rail Road closed that station on March 16, 1998. East Moriches Station was also closer to Frowein Road, but that station was closed by the LIRR two years before Suffolk County upgraded the road.

Truck Route 27A

From 1960 to 1972, Frowein Road was designated both as CR 98 and as New York State Truck Route 27A. Since Montauk Highway was designated New York State Route 27A as far as Eastport at the time, the road was considered an important detour for high trucks that would otherwise collide with the low railroad bridges over the then existing NY 27A in Moriches and East Moriches, New York. When the New York State Department of Transportation began to phase New York State Route 27A out east of Oakdale, New York, the designation as CR 98 became more prominent. Today, Truck Detour CR 80's exist closer to those bridges. The truck route around the bridge in Moriches is at Old Neck Road and Wilcox Avenue, and the truck route around the bridge in East Moriches is as Pine Street and Frowein Road.

Major intersections

| Location | mi | km | Destinations | Notes |
|---|---|---|---|---|
| Moriches | 0.0 | 0.0 | CR 80 (Montauk Highway) | Former NY 27A |
| Center Moriches | | | Brookfield (Manor) Road | |
| Center Moriches | | | Chickchester Avenue | Former CR 25 |
| Center Moriches | | | Railroad Avenue | To Long Island Game Farm |
| East Moriches | | | Pine Street | To former CR 72 |
| East Moriches | | | CR 80 (Montauk Highway) | Former NY 27A |
1.000 mi = 1.609 km; 1.000 km = 0.621 mi

== County Route 99 ==
County Route 99
- Location: Holtsville–Yaphank
- Length: 6.45 mi (10.38 km)
- Existed: 1970–present

County Route 99 is a major county road in the towns of Islip and southern Brookhaven. It runs east and west from CR 19 in Holtsville in the far-eastern town of Islip to CR 16 near Yaphank and Brookhaven hamlet, all in the southern town of Brookhaven.

Route description

The western end is a four-lane divided highway that contains a partial interchange with Waverly Avenue, and a full interchange with Buckley Road. It also includes an underpass for a driveway to the Holtsville Branch of the Internal Revenue Service near the Waverly Avenue interchange. This status is reduced northwest of Cannan Lake. Much of the road is a four-lane undivided highway with a center-left-turn lane used for residents and local intersections, except at the intersections of CR 83, Old Medford Avenue, and NY 112, where small concrete dividers run along the median of the road. The center-left-turn lane was previously a painted divider. From west of Old Medford Avenue to west of CR 101 (Patchogue–Yaphank Road), CR 99 borders Medford to the north and North Patchogue and East Patchogue to the south. Radio station WNYG (1580 AM) is located at the northeast corner of CR 99 and Pennsylvania Avenue.

After the intersection of Hospital Road, a street which leads to Brookhaven Memorial Hospital, CR 99 runs along the south side of a section of Medford known as The Pines, which includes a local recreational area known as Twelve Pines Park on the northeast corner of Sipp Avenue, and northwest of Pine Gate. The eastern end is also divided with a concrete barrier beginning west of CR 101, and a wider divider east of Station Road, where it resumes its status as a major highway. One last intersection with a housing development that replaced a former dirt road leading to the village of Bellport can be found before CR 99 approaches the Brookhaven town landfill and curves left before terminating at an incomplete at-grade interchange with CR 16 (Horse Block Road) in Brookhaven.

History

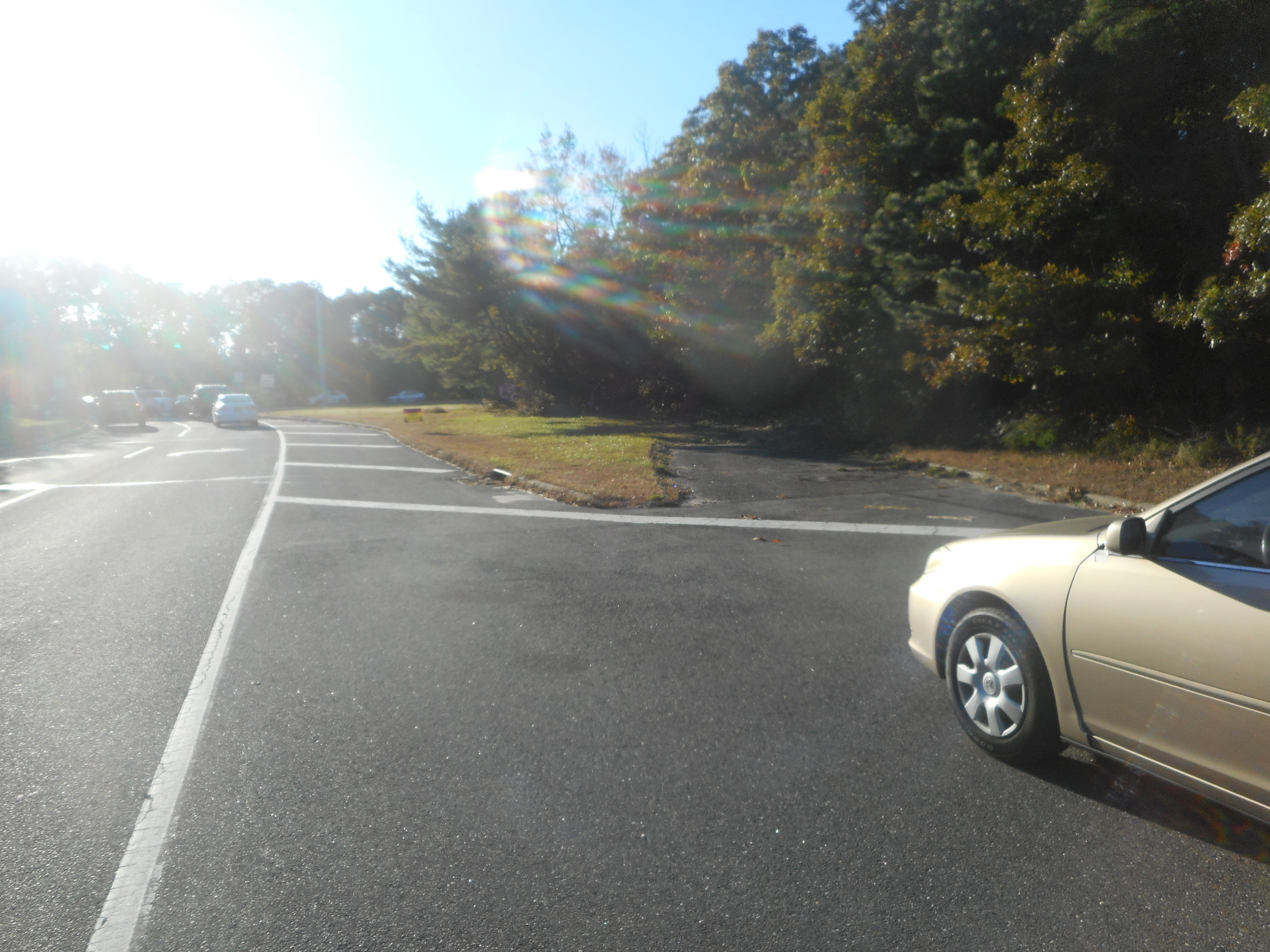
Stub for a never-built west-to-northbound ramp that runs parallel to the existing west-to-northbound CR 99 ramp at CR 19.

Woodside Avenue was officially designated as CR 99 on October 27, 1970, as a former Brookhaven town road spanning from Canaan Lake to Station Road in North Bellport It was widened to four lanes and extended during the mid-1970s. West Woodside Avenue which runs west of the north end of Canaan Lake, was a former section of Woodside Avenue.

At the west end of CR 99, there were originally stubs built for a new ramp and a possible extension beyond CR 19, to either CR 97 (Nicolls Road) or NY 454 (Veterans Memorial Highway). East of CR 16 (Horse Block Road), there were plans to upgrade the interchange into a limited-access one, and extend the road into CR 21 (Yaphank Avenue). The Suffolk County Department of Public Works' official list of county roads still included the eastern extension as part of the highway in 1986, but the construction of these extensions were never implemented.

Major intersections

| Location | mi | km | Destinations | Notes |
|---|---|---|---|---|
| Holtsville | 0.00 | 0.00 | CR 19 (Patchogue–Holbrook Road) | No westbound access to CR 19 south |
| Holtsville | West end of freeway section | | | |
| Holtsville | 0.25 | 0.40 | CR 61 (Waverly Avenue) | Exit ramps only; crosses the Islip–Brookhaven town line |
| Holtsville | | | Buckley Road | Diamond interchange |
| Holtsville | 1.75 | 2.82 | CR 83 (North Ocean Avenue) | East end of freeway section |
| East Patchogue | 2.28 | 3.67 | NY 112 (Medford Avenue) | |
| East Patchogue | 4.77 | 7.68 | CR 101 (Patchogue–Yaphank Road) | |
| North Bellport | 6.45 | 10.38 | CR 16 (Horseblock Road) | No eastbound access to CR 16 west |
1.000 mi = 1.609 km; 1.000 km = 0.621 mi: Incomplete access

== County Route 100 ==
County Route 100
- Location: Brentwood–Islandia
- Length: 4.85 mi (7.81 km)
- Existed: 1972–present

County Route 100 runs east and west from CR 13 in Brentwood to NY 454 in the village of Islandia. The route runs along the north side of the Ronkonkoma Branch of the Long Island Rail Road, and is four lanes wide from CR 13 to Brentwood Station, and again from CR 17 to NY 454. In between, the rest of the road remains two lanes, but has been anticipating the possibility of being widened to four lanes, since the two ends of the road were widened during the 1970s.

The original plan for CR 100 was to extend the road west of CR 13 along the main line of the Long Island Rail Road terminating it at NY 24 by way of the formerly proposed Republic Bypass.

Major intersections

| Location | mi | km | Destinations | Notes |
|---|---|---|---|---|
| Brentwood | 0.0 | 0.0 | CR 13 | Continues west as a Town of Islip Road |
| Central Islip | | | NY 111 | |
| Central Islip | | | CR 17 | Former NY 111 |
| Islandia | | | NY 454 | Continues northeast as Old Nichols Road |
1.000 mi = 1.609 km; 1.000 km = 0.621 mi
