= Harold H. Malkmes Wildlife Education and Ecology Center =

Park and zoo in Holtsville, New York, US

Coordinates: 40°47′58″N 73°02′06″W

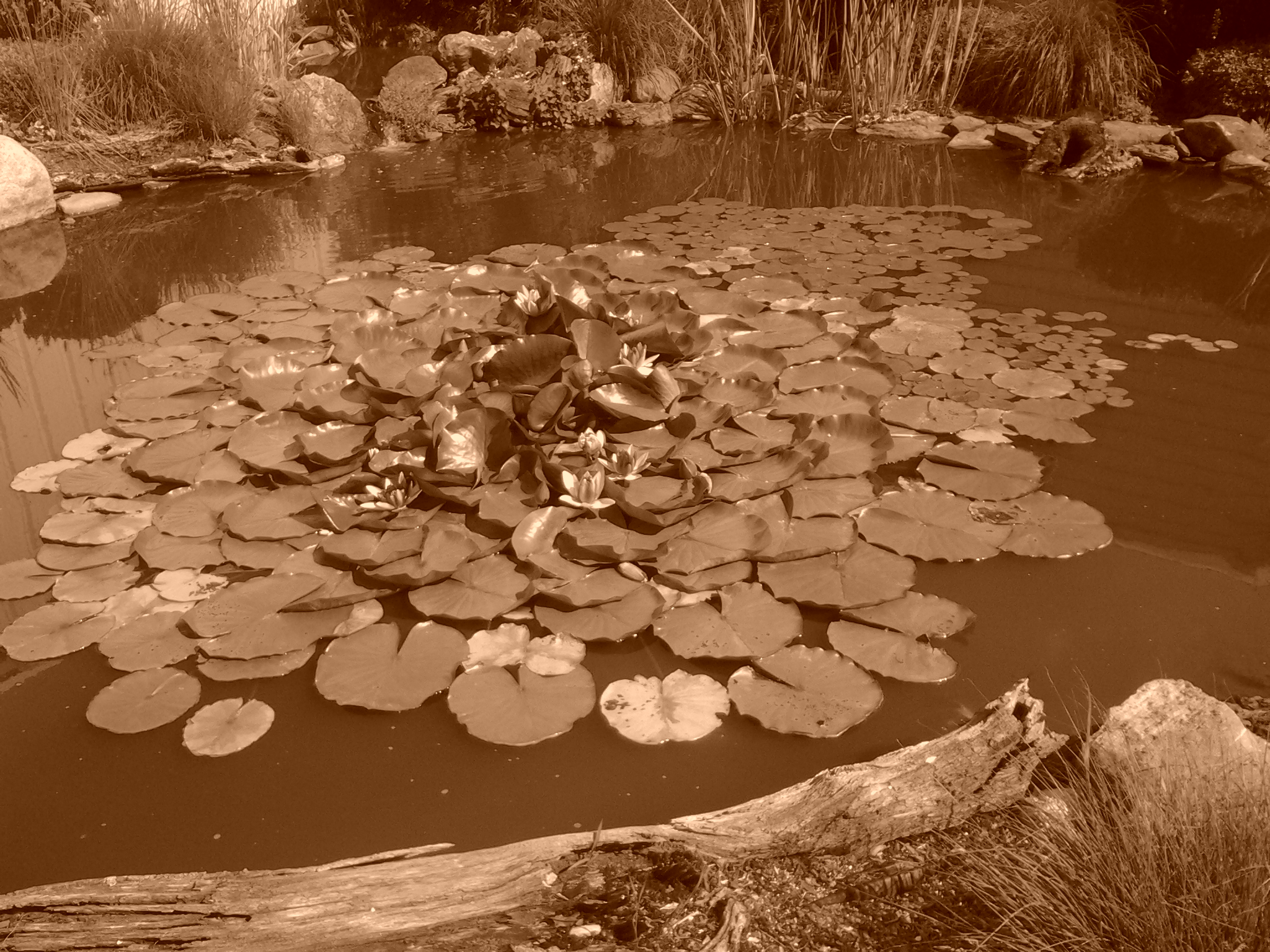
- Lily Pads and Lotus Flowers at the Ecology Center.
- Interactive map of Harold H. Malkmes Wildlife Education and Ecology Center
- Date opened: 1979
- Location: 249 Buckley Road, Holtsville, New York, US
- No. of animals: 100
- Management: Town of Brookhaven

The Harold H. Malkmes Wildlife Education and Ecology Center is a park, zoo, and ecology site in Holtsville, New York, United States, operated by the Town of Brookhaven, and located on the site of a former landfill. The official address is 249 Buckley Road, although some of the land owned by the site extends along Blue Point Road and as far south as Woodside Avenue. The ecology center was named for former Town of Brookhaven Superintendent of Highways Harold H. Malkmes.

== Attractions ==
The Harold H. Malkmes Wildlife Education and Ecology Center contains an Animal Wildlife Center, with free admission, containing over 100 injured or non-releasable wild and farm animals, including mountain lions. One well-known resident is groundhog "Holtsville Hal", who emerges each Groundhog Day to make a weather prediction.

The center also offers greenhouses, a picnic area, a 1.2-mile (1.9 km) paved exercise trail, free compost and wood chips, and a town pool (with an admission fee).

== History ==
The site of the Ecology Center was once a general dump owned by New York State, and was acquired by the Town of Brookhaven in 1937 for use as a town dump. Prior to this, the right of way for the Suffolk Traction Company trolley line also ran through this location. In 1968, the State Environmental Facilities Corporation converted the site into a sanitary landfill with seepage lagoons, and closed the facility completely by 1974. By 1971, the park was already under development, and opened in 1979.

The animal preserve has included mountain lions since 1987, when "Kimo" was recovered from an owner who had abused him.

The site faced closure due to budget cuts proposed in the 2013 Brookhaven Town Budget. However, as of 2016 the center remains open, officially known as the Town of Brookhaven Wildlife and Ecology Center.
