= Medford, New York =

- Hamlet & census-designated place
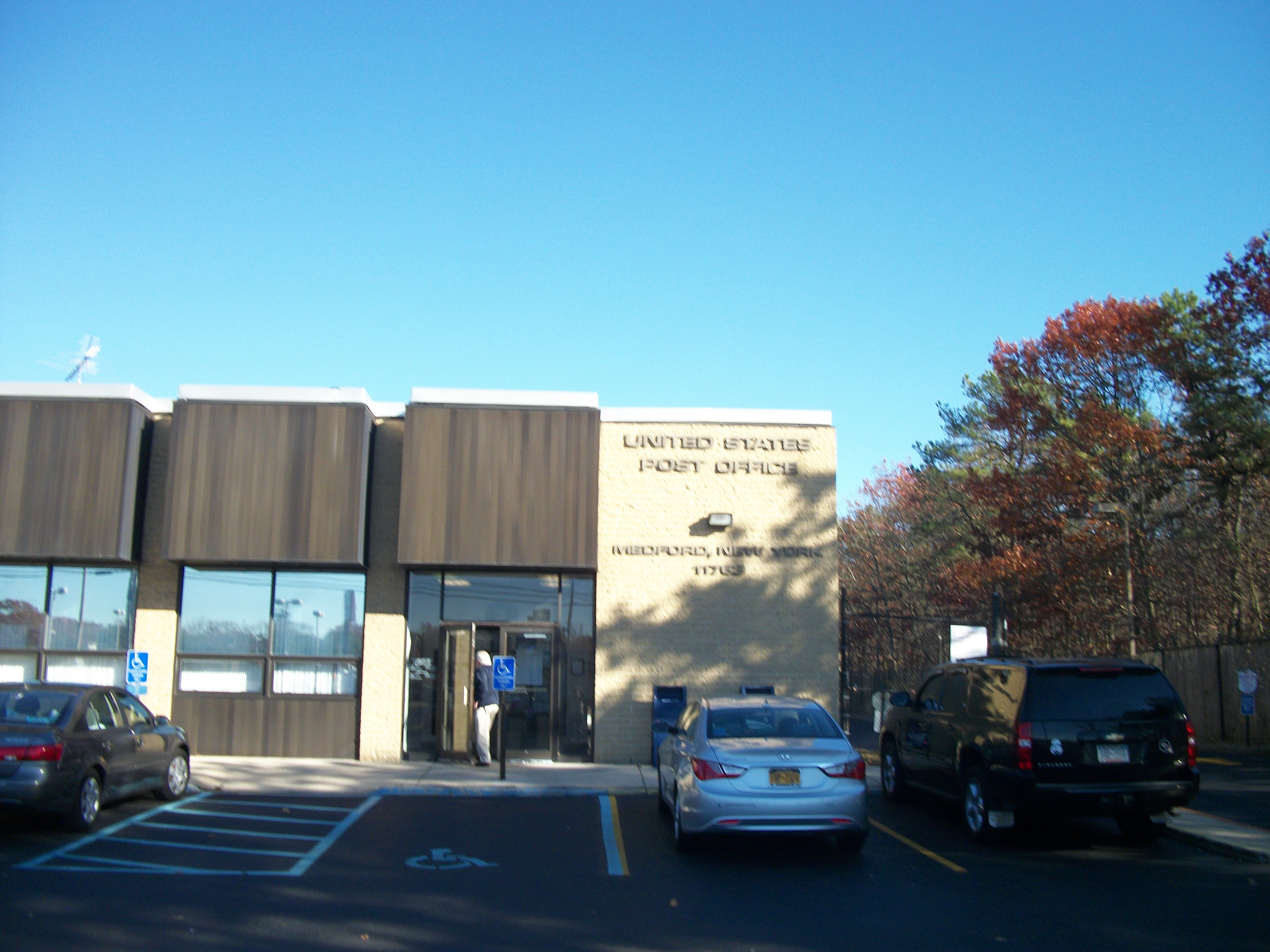
- The Medford Post Office in 2013.

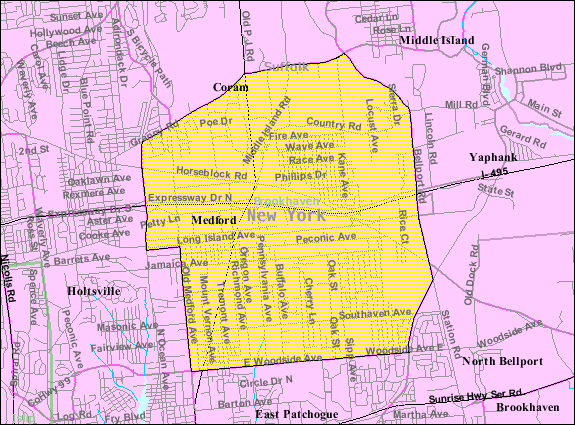
- U.S. Census map of Medford.

- Location in the state of New York. Medford, New York (New York)
- Coordinates: 40°49′4″N 72°59′10″W
- Country: United States
- State: New York
- County: Suffolk
- Town: Brookhaven

Area
  - Total: 10.80 sq mi (27.97 km^{2})
  - Land: 10.80 sq mi (27.97 km^{2})
  - Water: 0 sq mi (0.00 km^{2})
- Elevation: 89 ft (27 m)

Population (2020)
  - Total: 24,247
  - Density: 2,245.4/sq mi (866.95/km^{2})
- Time zone: UTC−05:00 (Eastern Time Zone)
  - Summer (DST): UTC−04:00
- ZIP Code: 11763
- Area codes: 631, 934
- FIPS code: 36-46404
- GNIS feature ID: 0956903

Medford is a hamlet and census-designated place (CDP) in the Town of Brookhaven in Suffolk County, on Long Island, in New York, United States. The population was 24,247 at the 2020 census.

== History ==
The Long Island Rail Road established the Medford station in 1843 in a flat wilderness in the Long Island Central Pine Barrens. The station connected to the Patchogue Stage Road between Patchogue and Port Jefferson, and a post office was established.

In 1907 the LIRR established the Medford Prosperity Farm (officially called Experimental Station #2) on 80 acres (320,000 m^{2}) to show that crops could be raised in the Pine Barrens. Theodore Roosevelt visited the station in August 1910. As the car drove across a trail between Medford and Wading River, it got stuck in the mud and Roosevelt was said to take a "flying leap" to get out.

By the mid-to-late-20th century, developers were building new neighborhoods within Medford. Eagle Estates was built along Horse Block Road east of NY 112 in 1963, although it was planned as far back as the 1930s. The development included a Blue Jay Market shopping center on Horseblock Road west of Eagle Avenue, and a youth baseball and athletic field east of Sipp Avenue between Wave and Race avenues. The Long Island Expressway was built through Medford in 1970, with interchanges at New York State Route 112 and Horseblock Road, the latter of which is close to an older interchange with Horseblock Road and Long Island Avenue, and was not completed until 1999. The Pines was established in the 1970s east of Buffalo Avenue, south of Jamaica Avenue, north of Woodside Avenue and far west of Patchogue-Yaphank Road.

A segment of Peconic Avenue east of Buffalo Avenue has been lined with automotive junkyards since the mid-20th century.

== Geography ==
According to the United States Census Bureau, the CDP has a total area of 10.8 square miles (28.0 km^{2}), all land.

== Demographics ==
Historical population
Census	Pop.	Note	%±
2020	24,247		—
U.S. Decennial Census

=== 2020 census ===
As of the 2020 census, Medford had a population of 24,247. The median age was 42.1 years. 20.0% of residents were under the age of 18 and 18.2% of residents were 65 years of age or older. For every 100 females there were 95.4 males, and for every 100 females age 18 and over there were 93.2 males age 18 and over.

100.0% of residents lived in urban areas, while 0.0% lived in rural areas.

There were 8,095 households in Medford, of which 31.8% had children under the age of 18 living in them. Of all households, 55.3% were married-couple households, 14.3% were households with a male householder and no spouse or partner present, and 24.2% were households with a female householder and no spouse or partner present. About 21.0% of all households were made up of individuals and 10.7% had someone living alone who was 65 years of age or older.

There were 8,416 housing units, of which 3.8% were vacant. The homeowner vacancy rate was 1.4% and the rental vacancy rate was 3.7%.

Racial composition as of the 2020 census
Race	Number	Percent
White	16,132	66.5%
Black or African American	1,661	6.9%
American Indian and Alaska Native	122	0.5%
Asian	777	3.2%
Native Hawaiian and Other Pacific Islander	12	0.0%
Some other race	2,663	11.0%
Two or more races	2,880	11.9%
Hispanic or Latino (of any race)	5,973	24.6%

=== 2000 census ===
As of the 2000 United States census, there were 21,985 people, 6,791 households, and 5,629 families residing in the CDP. The population density was 2,088.5 inhabitants per square mile (806.4/km^{2}). There were 6,939 housing units at an average density of 659.2 per square mile (254.5/km^{2}). The racial makeup of the CDP was 89.18% White, 3.98% African American, 0.25% Native American, 1.38% Asian, 0.02% Pacific Islander, 3.11% from other races, and 2.07% from two or more races. Hispanic or Latino of any race were 10.79% of the population.

There were 6,791 households, out of which 42.6% had children under the age of 18 living with them, 68.2% were married couples living together, 10.7% had a female householder with no husband present, and 17.1% were non-families. 13.2% of all households were made up of individuals, and 5.2% had someone living alone who was 65 years of age or older. The average household size was 3.23 and the average family size was 3.52.

In the CDP, the population was spread out, with 27.7% under the age of 18, 8.9% from 18 to 24, 30.9% from 25 to 44, 24.7% from 45 to 64, and 7.8% who were 65 years of age or older. The median age was 35 years. For every 100 females, there were 96.8 males. For every 100 females age 18 and over, there were 94.7 males.

The median income for a household in the CDP was $67,153, and the median income for a family was $70,493. Males had a median income of $46,485 versus $30,427 for females. The per capita income for the CDP was $22,579. About 1.5% of families and 3.3% of the population were below the poverty threshold, including 3.5% of those under age 18 and 4.4% of those age 65 or over.

== Education ==
Medford is served by the Patchogue-Medford School District, except for extreme southeastern Medford, which is served by the South Country Central School District, and extreme northeastern Medford, which is served by the Longwood Central School District.

== Media ==
W243ES and WLIM are radio stations licensed to serve Medford.

== Transportation ==
Medford is crossed by several busy roadways, including Horseblock Road (Suffolk CR 16), New York State Route 112, Patchogue-Yaphank Road/Sills Road (Suffolk CR 101) and the Long Island Expressway.

Public transportation in Medford has been provided at Medford station by the Long Island Rail Road since the hamlet was created. Suffolk County Transit provides bus service (route 55 from Patchogue LIRR station to Port Jefferson).

== Notable people ==
- Tricia Cast, soap opera actress.
- Kevin Connolly, known for playing "E" in Entourage, grew up in Medford and went to Patchogue-Medford High School.
- Christine Goerke, opera singer.
- Marcus Stroman, starting pitcher for the New York Yankees; previously played for the Chicago Cubs, the New York Mets and the Toronto Blue Jays of Major League Baseball.
- Bryant Neal Vinas, convicted of participating in and supporting al-Qaeda plots in Afghanistan and the U.S., and helping al-Qaeda plan a bomb attack on the LIRR.
