= Holtsville, New York =

- Hamlet and census-designated place
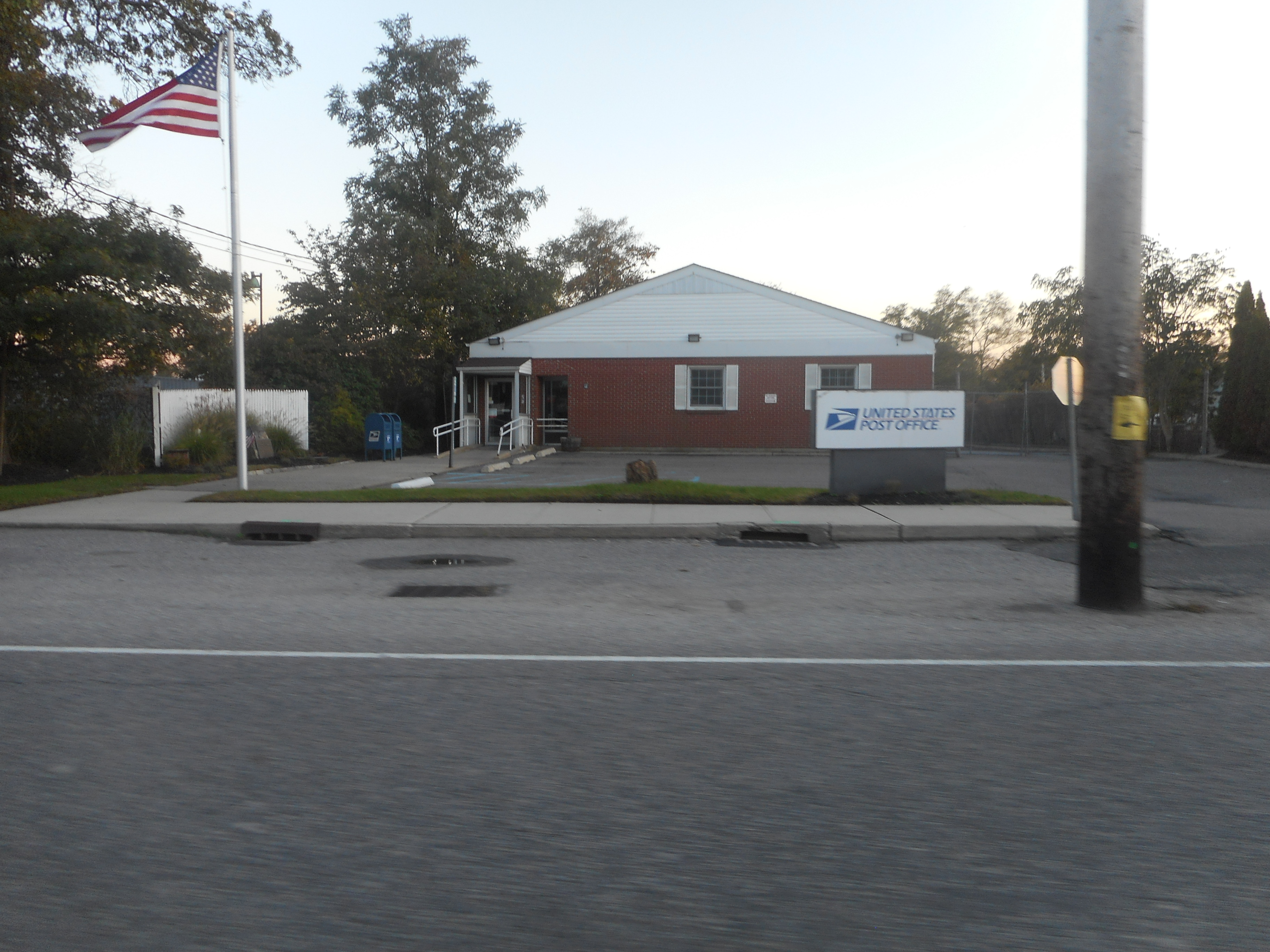
- The Holtsville Post Office in 2018.

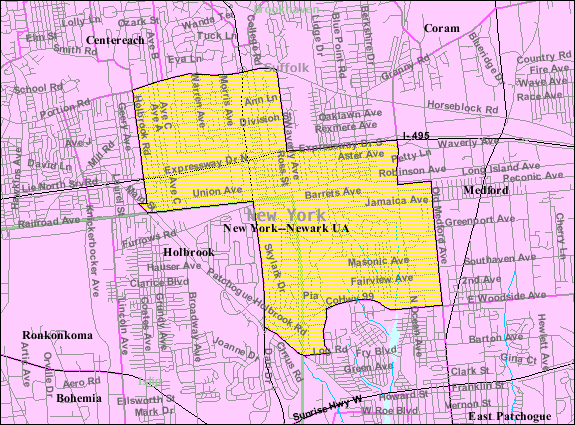
- U.S. Census map of Holtsville

- Location within the state of New York Holtsville, New York (New York)
- Coordinates: 40°48′48″N 73°2′50″W
- Country: United States
- State: New York
- County: Suffolk
- Towns: Brookhaven; Islip

Area
  - Total: 7.11 sq mi (18.41 km^{2})
  - Land: 7.11 sq mi (18.41 km^{2})
  - Water: 0 sq mi (0.00 km^{2})
- Elevation: 105 ft (32 m)

Population (2020)
  - Total: 18,937
  - Density: 2,663.9/sq mi (1,028.53/km^{2})
- Time zone: UTC−05:00 (Eastern Time Zone)
  - Summer (DST): UTC−04:00
- ZIP Codes: 00501, 00544, 11742
- Area codes: 631, 934
- FIPS code: 36-35254
- GNIS feature ID: 0953030

Holtsville is a hamlet and census-designated place (CDP) in Suffolk County, on Long Island, in New York, United States. As of the 2020 census, Holtsville had a population of 18,937.

The hamlet is mainly in the Town of Brookhaven, while the southwestern portion is in the Town of Islip. An IRS Processing Center is located in Holtsville, along with NYPA's Richard M. Flynn Power Plant.

== History ==
The hamlet known today as Holtsville included only a few farmhouses in the late 18th century. In 1843, the Long Island Rail Road opened its Waverly station. Maps from that period label the area as Waverly, and a stagecoach line ran north–south along present day Waverly Avenue. As another post office named Waverly already existed in New York, the name of the hamlet was changed to Holtsville in 1860, in honor of U.S. Postmaster General Joseph Holt. As of 1874, Holtsville consisted of 15 houses, a school, and a general store. The train station retained the name "Waverly" for some time, but was eventually also changed to Holtsville, probably in the 1890s, after farmers complained about their shipments going upstate by mistake. In 1916, the Suffolk County Tuberculosis Sanatorium opened on land that was considered Holtsville at the time, but is now part of the hamlet of Selden. The site later became the location of the main campus of Suffolk County Community College.

The Internal Revenue Service opened a large processing center on a 67-acre (270,000 m^{2}) site in the hamlet in 1972.

The rail era in Holtsville ended in 1998, when a number of LIRR stations closed due to low ridership. Holtsville commuters were advised to use Medford and Ronkonkoma stations; more use Ronkonkoma because, except for a few peak-hour trains terminating in Mineola or Hicksville, boarding at Medford would require transfer to an electric train at Ronkonkoma anyway.

As of 2016, the Internal Revenue Service in Holtsville has the lowest ZIP Code (00501) in use in the United States.

== Geography ==
According to the United States Census Bureau, the CDP has a total area of 7.1 square miles (18.4 km^{2}), all land.

== Demographics ==
Historical population
Census	Pop.	Note	%±
2020	18,937		—
U.S. Decennial Census

=== 2020 census ===
As of the 2020 census, Holtsville had a population of 18,937. The median age was 42.3 years. 19.8% of residents were under the age of 18 and 15.9% of residents were 65 years of age or older. For every 100 females there were 94.0 males, and for every 100 females age 18 and over there were 91.8 males age 18 and over.

100.0% of residents lived in urban areas, while 0.0% lived in rural areas.

There were 6,448 households in Holtsville, of which 33.3% had children under the age of 18 living in them. Of all households, 58.6% were married-couple households, 13.6% were households with a male householder and no spouse or partner present, and 22.0% were households with a female householder and no spouse or partner present. About 20.1% of all households were made up of individuals and 9.1% had someone living alone who was 65 years of age or older.

There were 6,646 housing units, of which 3.0% were vacant. The homeowner vacancy rate was 0.7% and the rental vacancy rate was 3.4%.

Racial composition as of the 2020 census
Race	Number	Percent
White	14,808	78.2%
Black or African American	495	2.6%
American Indian and Alaska Native	48	0.3%
Asian	1,042	5.5%
Native Hawaiian and Other Pacific Islander	3	0.0%
Some other race	891	4.7%
Two or more races	1,650	8.7%
Hispanic or Latino (of any race)	2,728	14.4%

=== 2010 census ===
As of the census of 2010, there were 19,714 people, 5,316 households, and 4,454 families residing in the CDP. The population density was 2,444.3 inhabitants per square mile (943.7/km^{2}). There were 5,418 housing units at an average density of 778.8 per square mile (300.7/km^{2}). The racial makeup of the CDP was 81.7% White, 1.7% African American, 0.09% Native American, 4.4% Asian, 0.01% Pacific Islander, 0.2% from other races, and 0.9% from two or more races. Hispanic or Latino of any race were 11.1% of the population.

There were 5,316 households, out of which 43.7% had children under the age of 18 living with them, 70.4% were married couples living together, 9.9% had a female householder with no husband present, and 16.2% were non-families. 12.0% of all households were made up of individuals, and 3.4% had someone living alone who was 65 years of age or older. The average household size was 3.19 and the average family size was 3.47.

In the CDP, the population was spread out, with 28.2% under the age of 18, 7.5% from 18 to 24, 33.5% from 25 to 44, 23.9% from 45 to 64, and 6.9% who were 65 years of age or older. The median age was 34 years. For every 100 females, there were 96.1 males. For every 100 females age 18 and over, there were 93.9 males.

The median income for a household in the CDP was $68,544, and the median income for a family was $71,784. Males had a median income of $50,361 versus $31,709 for females. The per capita income for the CDP was $24,031. About 2.4% of families and 3.6% of the population were below the poverty threshold, including 2.7% of those under age 18 and 4.0% of those age 65 or over.

== Parks and recreation ==
Holtsville is home to the Harold H. Malkmes Wildlife Education and Ecology Center, a public zoo and ecological park located on the site of a former landfill. Some of the amenities at the park include: a triple pool complex; exercise-trail fitness course; nature preserve and ecology center, featuring buffalo, bobcats, eagles, ecology exhibits and tours, free compost, greenhouses and a picnic area.

== Education ==
The Sachem School District serves the residents of Holtsville.

== Transportation ==
=== Roads ===
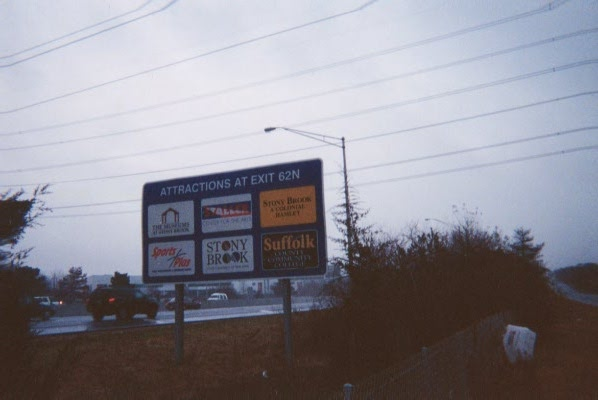
I-495, within Holtsville, passing a sign for attractions at Exit 62N Nicolls Road (CR 97), as seen from the eastbound service road.

Roads that pass through Holtsville include:

- I-495 (Long Island Expressway): access from Exit 62.
- CR-16, known as Portion Road and transitioning to Horse Block Road, forming the northern border of the CDP beginning at Holbrook Road, near the western border of the CDP and ending at Waverly Avenue on the eastern border of the CDP.
- CR-19, known as Patchogue-Yaphank Road and Waverly Avenue.
- CR-83, known as North Ocean Avenue and runs along part of the eastern border of the CDP.
- CR-97, known as Nicolls Road, forming part of the southwestern border of the CDP
- CR-99, known as Woodside Avenue, and is a partial limited-access highway on the southeastern edge of the community.

=== Buses ===
Bus service in Holtsville is provided by Suffolk County Transit.

=== Train ===
Holtsville is accessible on the Ronkonkoma Branch of the Long Island Rail Road. The Holtsville station closed in 1998, and, as of 2025, the nearest stations to the CDP are Ronkonkoma and Medford.

=== Airport ===
- Long Island MacArthur Airport is southwest in Holbrook. The Bayport Aerodrome is a smaller airport in Bayport, but it specializes in antique airplanes.

== Notable people ==
- Stephen Turnbull (born 1998), soccer player
