= Oakdale Merge =

Location
- Great River–Oakdale, New York
- Coordinates: 40°44′52″N 73°08′58″W
- Roads at junction: NY 27; NY 27A; CR 85

Construction
- Type: At-grade
- Constructed: 1953
- Reconstructed: 1989, 1999, 2020
- Maintained by: NYSDOT

The Oakdale Merge is a convergence of Sunrise Highway (New York State Route 27, NY 27) and Montauk Highway (NY 27A and County Route 85, CR 85) between the hamlets of Great River and Oakdale, in Suffolk County, New York, in front of Connetquot River State Park.

== Description ==
The Oakdale Merge begins at exit 46A on Sunrise Highway (NY 27); Montauk Highway (NY 27A) becomes CR 85 at this location. Montauk Highway then veers east to parallel Sunrise Highway to just before exit 47 on the latter highway—at which point CR 85 veers back towards the south, with incomplete access to and from the South Service Road of NY 27.

According to the New York State Department of Transportation (NYSDOT), the interchange handles, on average, approximately 126,000 vehicles per day.

== History ==
Originally the area featured Montauk Highway, but when Sunrise Highway was extended through the area east from Amityville in the 1930s. In 1953, Sunrise Highway was extended farther east, to East Patchogue, and Sunrise overlapped Montauk Highway between the two sections. The western at-grade interchange had a westbound-only ramp to Montauk Highway and an east-to-west U-turn to take motorists to the park entrance. The eastern intersection contained turning ramps in both directions to and from Montauk Highway. One former segment of Montauk Highway remained at the southwest corner of the east intersection of Sunrise and Montauk. NY 27 and NY 27A were both overlapped until NY 27A was truncated to the west end of this merge in 1972. Montauk Highway became CR 85 from here to Patchogue, and CR 80 from Patchogue to The Hamptons.

Plans to upgrade Sunrise Highway and Montauk Highway have pre-dated the extension of the former to Oakdale. In the early 1960s, the Suffolk County Department of Public Works had even considered adding a county highway leading from CR 97 (Nicolls Road) in Lake Grove to the east end of the Oakdale Merge, by way of Long Island MacArthur Airport. By the 1980s, NYSDOT has planned to add service roads and a proper interchange with the two segments of Montauk Highway, although technically not a split-diamond interchange, the eastern Montauk Highway bridge was to include a westbound-only flyover. However, pressure from environmental groups seeking to avoid damaging the parkland stalled construction.

When NYSDOT upgraded Sunrise Highway into a controlled-access expressway through the Town of Islip during the 1980s, they settled on the present interchange design, which relocated Montauk Highway onto a tight, parallel road, with only eastbound connections from Sunrise Highway via off-ramps and one service road; this configuration eliminated the at-grade, signalized intersection, which was notorious for backups. The entrance to Connetquot River Park, however remained as an at-grade intersection, accessible only from the westbound lane. Former segments of Montauk Highway now existed on both sides of the interchange, and both roads were converted into fishing areas owned by the New York State Department of Environmental Conservation.

The current design of the interchange frequently causes congestion between Great River and Oakdale, has forced the use of convoluted routes to some destinations. In order to gain access to westbound Montauk Highway from westbound Sunrise Highway, motorists must either use exit 47A and turn south on Oakdale-Bohemia Road, or use exit 46 and take either Connetquot Avenue or Heckscher State Parkway south. To gain access to Connetquot River State Park from eastbound Sunrise Highway, motorists must use exit 47A and make a U-turn back onto westbound Sunrise Highway. The current design has also been criticized as frequently causing drivers to become confused & disoriented—in addition to it being a safety hazard: the east end of the merge has been the scene of numerous accidents, which have involved the access to the eastbound service roads from both directions on Montauk Highway. The issues have led to the Oakdale Merge being colloquially referred to by locals as "The Twilight Zone" and as a "death trap".

In 1999, the east-to-east entrance to the service road was closed, a new off-ramp to the service road for Pond Road was built, and the off-ramp for Montauk Highway was renumbered from exit 47 to exit 46A. The other problems with the interchange remain.

=== 21st century improvement projects ===
In 2018, NYSDOT announced preliminary proposals to improve the Oakdale Merge. These proposals included grade separating the roadways, installing movable barriers to create reversible lanes, and adding express lanes. Construction soon began on a $7.2-million project to implement short-term improvements, which saw the installation of ramp meters, improved emergency access, refreshed pavement and lane markings, and baffles on the barriers to reduce glare from headlights; the short-term safety improvement project was completed in 2020. Planning for the future reconstruction of the Oakdale Merge would continue, and in 2022, $30 million was allocated in New York's state budget for the reconstruction project. Additional funding would be budgeted in 2023.

In January 2024, it was announced that Governor Kathleen C. Hochul's 2024 state budget would include further funds for studying how best to reconstruct the interchange.
