= County Route 16 (Suffolk County, New York) =

Road in Suffolk County, New York, US

County Route 16
- Map of Suffolk County on Long Island with CR 16 highlighted in red

Route information
- Maintained by SCDPW
- Length: 15.90 mi (25.59 km)
- Existed: 1930–present

Major junctions
- West end: NY 25 in Village of the Branch
- NY 347 near Smithtown; CR 97 in Holtsville; CR 83 in Farmingville; NY 112 in Medford; I-495 in Medford; CR 101 near Yaphank; NY 27 / CR 21 / CR 56 in Brookhaven
- East end: CR 80 in Brookhaven

Location
- Country: United States
- State: New York
- County: Suffolk

Highway system
- County routes in New York; County Routes in Suffolk County
← CR 15	→ CR 17

County Route 16 (CR 16) is a main thoroughfare through central Suffolk County, New York, in the United States. Its western terminus is at Middle Country Road (New York State Route 25 or NY 25) in Village of the Branch, and its eastern terminus is at Montauk Highway (CR 80) in Brookhaven. The route carries five different names along its length: Terry Road, Smithtown Boulevard, Lake Shore Road, Portion Road, and Horseblock Road.

== Route description ==
CR 16 begins as Terry Road at an intersection with NY 25 in Village of the Branch. From NY 25, the road runs to the south near a former concrete factory. It then crosses NY 347. Several blocks south of NY 347, CR 16 joins Smithtown Boulevard, while Terry Road continues to run south as a road maintained by the Town of Smithtown, and crosses the Islip town line into Ronkonkoma. A former section of Terry Road exists near NY 25A. It is unknown how this section connected to the present terminus of Terry Road at NY 25 while traversing the surrounding terrain.

Of the five roads shared by CR 16, Smithtown Boulevard is the only road completely controlled by Suffolk County. Not only are there no former sections, but there are no sections of the road that branch off as local streets. Smithtown Boulevard goes from Smithtown, through Nesconset where it serves as the hamlet's main street, and eventually terminates in Lake Ronkonkoma east of CR 93 (Rosevale Avenue). At one time, CR 76 (Town Line Road) was proposed to curve north of the Smithtown–Islip town line, and terminate between Old Nichol's Road (not to be confused with CR 97, named Nicolls Road) and Rosevale Avenue.

Along the north and east side of Lake Ronkonkoma is a road known as Lake Shore Drive, the northern portion of which consists mostly of CR 16, except between Spectacle Lake Road and Schoolhouse Road, which is maintained by the Town of Smithtown. The east end of this section near Schoolhouse Road has suffered such excessive flooding that it was closed by Suffolk County and turned over to the Parks Department, while the rest of it was sold to a local night club on the lake and transformed into part of the parking lot. East of Schoolhouse Road however, the road crosses the Smithtown–Brookhaven town line and runs high along the bluffs of Lake Ronkonkoma until it reaches Portion Road. CR 16 moves east onto Portion Road while Lake Shore Drive continues south along the lake as a road maintained by the Town of Brookhaven.

Portion Road begins at the intersection of Lake Shore Drive. Old Portion Road is a former section of Portion Road located just south of that intersection. Through Lake Ronkonkoma and western Farmingville, CR 16 crawls eastward in a hilly region of Long Island, as it intersects with Ronkonkoma Avenue, Hawkins Avenue, CR 19 (Patchogue–Holbrook Road), and Holbrook Road before reaching an interchange with CR 97 (Nicolls Road), where the road opens up to four lanes. Suffolk County is currently planning to widen the rest of the road to four lanes. This section of CR 16 once carried the additional name of Farm-to-Market Road.

For all intents and purposes, Horseblock Road is the main section of CR 16. Like Portion Road, it once shared the additional name of Farm-to-Market Road. Unlike the rest of CR 16, Horseblock Road's western terminus is at Middle Country Road (NY 25) in Centereach. Originally, Horseblock Road was connected to another street a few blocks west of the current terminus named Mark Tree Road. The two sections formed a single road that ran from South Setauket to South Haven. The connection between the two streets are cut off by a shopping center on the north side of NY 25 between Mark Tree and Eastwood Road. It then traverses to the south-southeast, and is cut off by CR 97 (Nicolls Road), Suffolk County Community College, and other county facilities in Farmingville, and joins up with Portion Road from a frontage road west of Nicolls Road named Leeds Boulevard at the interchange with Nicolls Road. The section east of Nicolls Road resumes at Horseblock Place and then joins Portion Road west of Waverly Avenue.

Horseblock Road then travels east-southeast through Farmingville (home of the historic Bald Hill Schoolhouse and Cotten Coverage Insurance Agency), intersecting Blue Point Road, Granny Road, and CR 83 (North Ocean Avenue) and then narrows down to two lanes eventually entering Medford, intersecting NY 112, the Long Island Expressway at exit 65, and CR 101 (Patchogue–Yaphank Road). It then enters southern Yaphank and Brookhaven, where it intersects CR 99 (Woodside Avenue, a road whose construction in the early 1970s lead to Horseblock Road's realignment) and then CR 21 (Yaphank Avenue), where it shares an interchange with Sunrise Highway (NY 27) before terminating at CR 80 (Montauk Highway) in Brookhaven.

== History ==
The segment between Ronkonkoma and South Haven was built by the Works Progress Administration and gave the Portion Road and Horse Block Road southeast of Portion the dual name of "Farm to Market Road," in the hopes of giving farmers of southeastern Long Island an accessible road to western segments of Long Island.

Though CR 16 has run consistently from Smithtown to Brookhaven since the mid-1960s, this wasn't always the case. Many segments have been part of other county roads.

East Lake Shore Terrace Drive and Portion Road used to be part of CR 19 from the Smithtown–Brookhaven Town Line to Waverly Avenue in Farmingville. In 1960, this terminus was moved to Patchogue–Holbrook Road.

The construction of Sunrise Highway in 1957 lead to the realignment of Horseblock Road west of its original eastern terminus with South Country Road (former Montauk Highway) in South Haven. Because the interchange is shared with CR 21, the new alignment was originally designated as CR 21A.

Horseblock Road used to be a western extension of CR 56 between Victory Avenue, a frontage road along Sunrise Highway that begins at CR 46, in Brookhaven and Waverly Avenue in Farmingville. In 1964, it was moved only to Victory Avenue. The frontage road was mainly unmarked until the 2010s.

== Major intersections ==
The entire route is in Suffolk County.

Location	mi	km	Destinations	Notes
Village of the Branch	0.00	0.00	NY 25 (Middle Country Road) – Smithtown, Lake Grove	
Smithtown	0.60	0.97	NY 347 (Smithtown Bypass) – Port Jefferson, Hauppauge	
Nesconset	2.34	3.77	Old Nichols Road – Lake Grove, Islandia	
Lake Ronkonkoma	2.94	4.73	CR 93 south (Rosevale Avenue) – St. James, Ronkonkoma	Northern terminus of CR 93
Lake Ronkonkoma	4.40	7.08	Ronkonkoma Avenue	Access to Ronkonkoma station and MacArthur Airport
Lake Ronkonkoma	4.60	7.40	Hawkins Avenue – Stony Brook, Lake Grove	
Lake Ronkonkoma	5.07	8.16	CR 19 south (Patchogue Road) – Holbrook, Patchogue	Northern terminus of CR 19
Holtsville	7.31	11.76	CR 97 (Nicolls Road) to I-495 – Stony Brook, Blue Point	Partial cloverleaf interchange
Farmingville	7.77	12.50	Waverly Avenue – Holtsville, Patchogue	
Farmingville	8.56	13.78	Blue Point Road – Selden, Holtsville	
Farmingville	9.25	14.89	CR 83 (North Ocean Avenue) – Mount Sinai, Patchogue	
Medford	10.64	17.12	NY 112 – Port Jefferson, Patchogue	
Medford	11.76	18.93	I-495 (Long Island Expressway) – New York, Riverhead	Exit 65 on I-495
Medford	11.87	19.10	Long Island Avenue	Interchange
Medford	12.93	20.81	Bellport Avenue / Station Road – Coram, Bellport	
Yaphank	13.13	21.13	CR 101 (Sills Road) – Yaphank, East Patchogue	
Yaphank	14.43	23.22	CR 99 west (Woodside Avenue) – Holbrook	Eastern terminus of CR 99
Yaphank	15.39	24.77	NY 27 west (Sunrise Highway) / CR 21 (Yaphank Avenue) – New York	
Yaphank	15.55	25.03	CR 56 east (Victory Avenue)	Western terminus of CR 56; access to South Haven County Park
Brookhaven	15.63	25.15	NY 27 (Sunrise Highway) – New York, Montauk	No eastbound access to NY 27 west; exits 57S-N on NY 27
Brookhaven	15.90	25.59	CR 80 (Montauk Highway) – Shirley, Brookhaven	Former NY 27A
1.000 mi = 1.609 km; 1.000 km = 0.621 mi: Incomplete access
