= Poquott, New York =

- Village
- Incorporated Village of Poquott
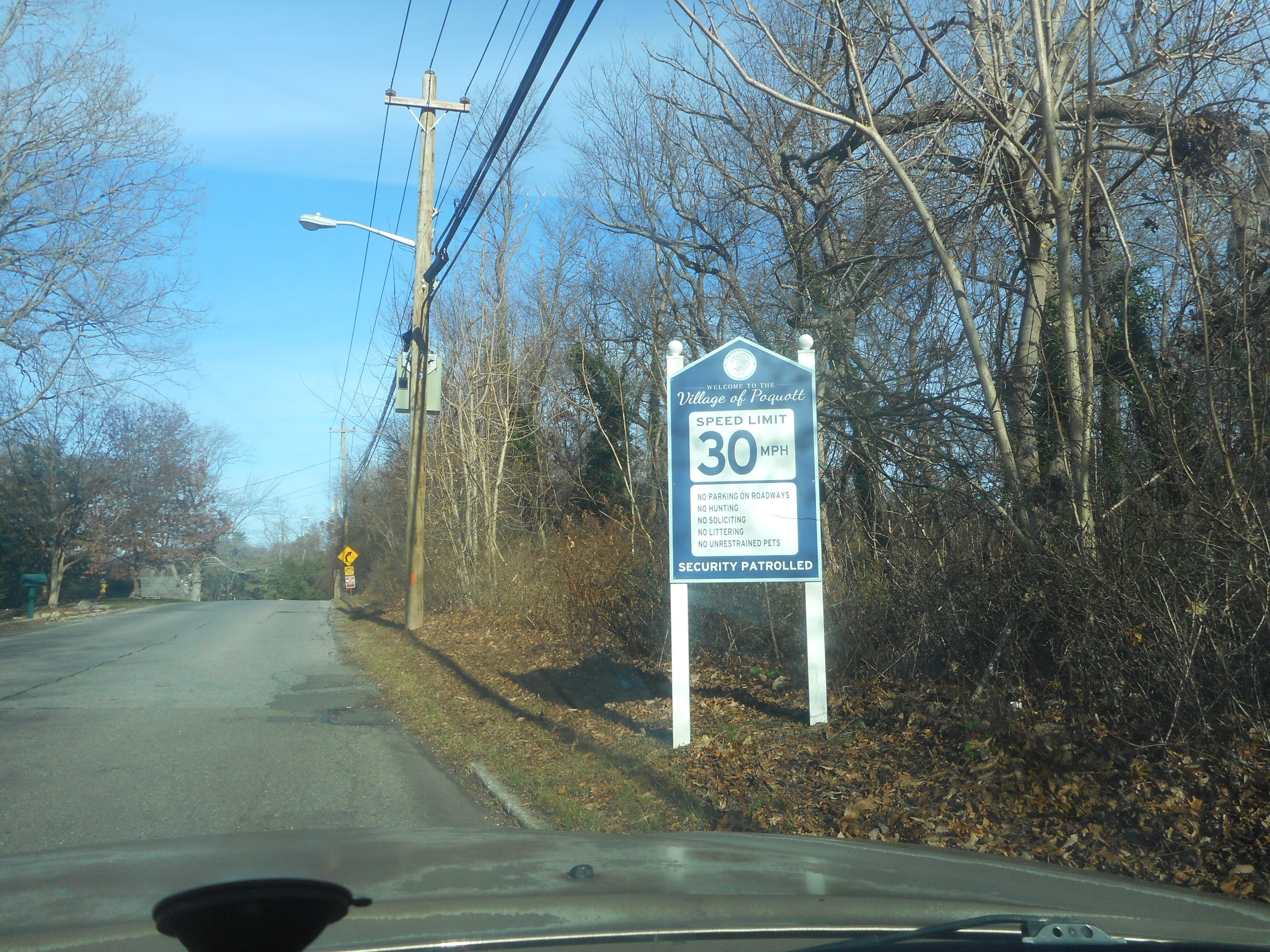
- Speed limit and other regulations for the Village of Poquott, as seen from Washington Street

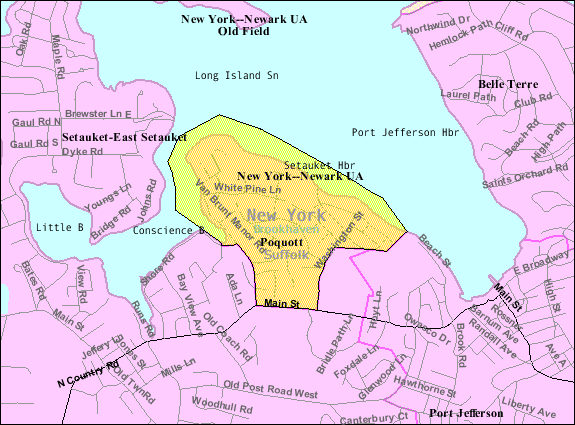
- U.S. Census Map

- Location within the state of New York
- Coordinates: 40°57′9″N 73°5′4″W
- Country: United States
- State: New York
- County: Suffolk
- Town: Brookhaven
- Incorporated: January 1931

Area
  - Total: 0.59 sq mi (1.52 km^{2})
  - Land: 0.44 sq mi (1.14 km^{2})
  - Water: 0.15 sq mi (0.38 km^{2})
- Elevation: 66 ft (20 m)

Population (2020)
  - Total: 903
  - Density: 2,059.5/sq mi (795.18/km^{2})
- Time zone: UTC−05:00 (Eastern Time Zone)
  - Summer (DST): UTC−04:00
- ZIP Code: 11733
- Area codes: 631, 934
- FIPS code: 36-59157
- GNIS feature ID: 0960954
- Website: www.villageofpoquott.com

Poquott /poʊˈkwɒt/ is a village in Suffolk County, New York, United States. The village is located in the Town of Brookhaven, on the North Shore of Long Island, and is officially known as the Incorporated Village of Poquott. The population was 903 at the time of the 2020 census.

== History ==
Poquott was founded by European settlers in 1659. The peninsula came to be known as “George’s Neck”, and was developed mostly as farmland. A fort with a single 32-pound gun, dubbed “Fort Nonsense”, was erected at the tip of Poquott during the War of 1812. It did little to deter the British raiders who entered Port Jefferson Harbor.

As the 20th century approached, “California Grove” was established at what is now the foot of Washington Street (1883). California Grove was an amusement park that featured an oyster restaurant, dancing pavilion, skating rink, picnic grounds, and a pier at which the steamboat Notowantuc would unload tourists from Connecticut. The establishment of California Grove led to Poquott’s development as a summer bungalow community.

Poquott continued to grow as a summer community. Several camps (Dr. Petit’s Camp/Camp Woodbine/Pine Bluff Camp) dotted the shorelines of Poquott. At the turn of the century, large swaths of George’s Neck came into the hands of world traveler, financier, and businessman Edward Larocque Tinker. The Tinker family built several stunning homes throughout Poquott.

Residents fought hard to preserve “Bayview Park”, as Poquott was referred to “back in the day”, when plans came up to develop the shorelines for industry. The Village of Poquott was ultimately incorporated in 1931. Extensive development took place in Poquott after the sale of the Tinker Estate that was later subdivided into Tinker Bluff, in the 1980s. The Village now consists of primarily year-round residences, although a few summer homes still remain.

== Geography ==
According to the United States Census Bureau, the village has a total area of 0.6 square miles (1.6 km^{2}), of which 0.4 square miles (1.0 km^{2}) is land and 0.2 square miles (0.52 km^{2}), or 27.12%, is water. Residents have access to two beaches and a harbor front park. Walnut Beach lies on the shore of Port Jefferson Harbor, while Van Brunt Manor Beach allows for access to the waters of Setauket Harbor. Both beaches feature dinghy and kayak racks. California Park features two large fields, a gazebo, a private boat ramp, dinghy racks, and a playground. All residents are granted exclusive mooring rights off Poquott’s shoreline.

Village Hall lies at the foot of Birchwood Avenue, and adjoins Trustees Park. The park offers Poquott residents over two acres of scenic parkland, a greenhouse, private tennis courts, communal gardens, a playground, and picnicking areas. Recently added, Newfield Park, adjacent to California Park, was named in 2023 to honor long-time resident, and Village Clerk, Mr. Joseph Newfield.

Two easements, Steve’s Path and the “Indian Trail”, allow for additional access to Port Jefferson Harbor. Steve’s Path connects Tinker Bluff Court to Port Jefferson Harbor, and the Indian Trail connects Birchwood Avenue to Walnut Beach

== Demographics ==
Historical population
Census	Pop.	Note	%±
1940	73		—
1950	136		86.3%
1960	295		116.9%
1970	427		44.7%
1980	588		37.7%
1990	770		31.0%
2000	975		26.6%
2010	953		−2.3%
2020	903		−5.2%
U.S. Decennial Census

As of the census of 2000, there were 975 people, 350 households, and 262 families residing in the village. The population density was 2,231.4 inhabitants per square mile (861.5/km^{2}). There were 378 housing units at an average density of 865.1 per square mile (334.0/km^{2}). The racial makeup of the village was 92.41% White, 2.46% African American, 4.10% Asian, 0.10% from other races, and 0.92% from two or more races. Hispanic or Latino of any race were 4.41% of the population.

There were 350 households, out of which 41.4% had children under the age of 18 living with them, 65.4% were married couples living together, 6.9% had a female householder with no husband present, and 25.1% were non-families. 16.9% of all households were made up of individuals, and 4.9% had someone living alone who was 65 years of age or older. The average household size was 2.79 and the average family size was 3.18.

In the village, the population was spread out, with 26.3% under the age of 18, 6.7% from 18 to 24, 29.6% from 25 to 44, 28.7% from 45 to 64, and 8.7% who were 65 years of age or older. The median age was 39 years. For every 100 females, there were 97.0 males. For every 100 females age 18 and over, there were 94.3 males.

The median income for a household in the village was $99,309, and the median income for a family was $116,379. Males had a median income of $81,665 versus $50,208 for females. The per capita income for the village was $58,455. None of the families and 3.0% of the population were living below the poverty threshold, including no under eighteens and 4.7% of those over 64.
