= County Route 97 (Suffolk County, New York) =

County road in Suffolk County, New York, US

County Route 97
- Nicolls Road
- Map of Suffolk County on Long Island with CR 97 highlighted in red

Route information
- Maintained by SCDPW
- Length: 14.29 mi (23.00 km)

Major junctions
- South end: CR 85 in Bayport
- NY 27 / NY 454 at the Bayport–Holbrook line I-495 in Farmingville; NY 25 in Centereach; NY 347 in Lake Grove
- North end: NY 25A in Stony Brook

Location
- Country: United States
- State: New York
- County: Suffolk

Highway system
- County routes in New York; County Routes in Suffolk County
← CR 96	→ CR 98

County Route 97 (CR 97) is a north–south expressway in Suffolk County, New York, in the United States. It runs from an intersection with CR 85 (Montauk Highway) in Bayport just west of Blue Point on the south shore of Long Island to a junction with New York State Route 25A (NY 25A) in Stony Brook on the island's north shore. A 5-mile (8.0 km) section of the route from Holbrook to Farmingville is a freeway, while the remainder of the road is an expressway with at-grade intersections. CR 97 is known as Nicolls Road, named after 17th-century colonial Governor Richard Nicolls.

== Route description ==
CR 97 begins as a four-lane expressway at CR 85 (Montauk Highway) west of the Islip–Brookhaven town line in Bayport just west of Blue Point. The median at this end was widened for the purpose of adding a trumpet interchange that was never built.

The road runs as a four-lane freeway on two long bridges over Furrows Road (unmarked CR 90), the Main Line of the Long Island Rail Road and Long Island Avenue. Access to Long Island Avenue is available from turning ramps onto Union Avenue which lead to connecting roads that run parallel to CR 97. As the road approaches the Long Island Expressway (Interstate 495 or I-495), it runs below a cloverleaf with collector/distributor roads along the expressway that were built before Nicolls Road itself, and had served as the southern terminus of Nicolls Road until 1975. The freeway portion terminates north of the CR 16 (Portion Road) interchange. From here, the road runs along the western side of the Ammerman Campus of Suffolk County Community College where it briefly curves to the northwest, then moves back north after crossing South Coleman Road before reaching the interchange with NY 25.

North of NY 25, the road takes another northwest curve until it reaches Hawkins Road south of Wireless Road, and takes a much more westerly direction. In this section, Hawkins Road serves as a frontage road along the southbound lane between Pond Path Drive and Wireless Road, while Bette Ann Drive serves as an additional frontage road along the northbound lane from Mark Tree Road to the Hawkins and Wireless Road intersection. Both frontage roads are two lanes wide and are bi-directional. Only after crossing Pond Path Drive does Nicolls Road return to a north–south road before reaching NY 347, which is slated to get a cloverleaf interchange.

Beyond NY 347, Nicolls Road is surrounded by suburban development of the 1960s, although very few of that development leads directly to the road. At some point, the developed area ends, and CR 97 winds through the hills of Stony Brook University with numerous underpasses mainly for pedestrians. As St. George's Golf and Country Club becomes more visible, CR 97 approaches the penultimate intersection between the northernmost driveway into Stony Brook University before descending back into suburbia and intersecting a connecting road to Lower Sheep Pasture Road. A short distance to the north is a bridge carrying the Port Jefferson Branch of the Long Island Rail Road over CR 97 and the north end of Nicolls Road at a junction with NY 25A.

== History ==
The road started out as two different main highways through two different colleges in Suffolk County, and was built in stages from north to south.

=== Origins ===
The oldest section of Nicolls Road was built in the early 1960s between NY 25A and the Nesconset–Port Jefferson Highway, now known as NY 347. The railroad bridge that carries the Port Jefferson Branch of the Long Island Rail Road replaced an older and narrower one over a former section of Sheep Pasture Road. Nicolls Road bisected two sections of Oxhead Road between Sycamore Avenue and Hawkins Road. In the mid-1970s, the driveways and pedestrian underpasses around Stony Brook University were relocated in a major reconstruction project.

The next oldest section of Nicolls Road was built on the ground of the former Suffolk Sanatorium, which was converted into the main campus of Suffolk County Community College. Originally, this segment only ran between South Coleman Road and Portion Road (now CR 16). However, it ended up bisecting Horse Block Road. In order to reconnect the western section of Horse Block Road back to Portion Road, two side roads were built: a north–south frontage called Leeds Boulevard and an east–west street called Horse Block Place between Leeds Boulevard and College Road. A cloverleaf interchange with Portion Road was built in 1971, and the south-to-west ramp connected to both directions on Leeds Boulevard. In the fall of 2008, the left turning lanes at Horse Block Place were eliminated to relieve traffic heading towards the college. In from the late 20th Century to present day Nicholls Road is on speculation giving its rights to the NYSDOT as NY State Route 436.

=== Merging two college roads ===
While connecting the two segments, local streets such as Hawkins Road were reconstructed as a frontage road between Pond Path and Wireless Road, while Bette Ann Drive was built as an additional frontage road along the northbound lane west to Mark Tree Road. At the intersection with Hawkins Road and Wireless Road, the southern terminus of the formerly proposed CR 110 (A.O. Smith Turnpike) was intended to be built with an interchange. A.O. Smith Turnpike was to replace Wireless Road, and continue north of NY 347, towards the vicinity of Port Jefferson Harbor leading to a possible bridge to Bridgeport, Connecticut. The interchange with NY 25 was originally built as a widened median intersection that was intended to be a cloverleaf with outer ramps that connected to local streets like North Hammond Road and South Coleman Road, although construction of this interchange had been put on hold for decades.

Along with the merging of the Stony Brook University and Suffolk Community College sections was the 1971 extension south of Portion Road to the Long Island Expressway. The Division Street overpass was built in 1975, four years after the at-grade intersection was built. After years of financial and bureaucratic delays and rampant development, the NY 25 interchange was finally built as New York State's first single-point urban interchange in 1998.

=== South of the Long Island Expressway ===
The construction of Nicolls Road south of exit 62 on I-495 required an extension of Long Island Avenue to Union Avenue, which was cut off by the road and turned into on-off ramps for Long Island Avenue. Two long bridges were built over the Long Island Avenue Extension, the LIRR Main Line, and Furrows Road, which was formerly proposed to be built as part of a Central Suffolk Highway designed to reconnect the two broken ends of NY 24 between East Farmingdale and Calverton.

The interchange with NY 27 was originally an intersection that replaced an intersection with Sylvan Avenue, which became a dirt road north of Sunrise Highway. Like the one with NY 25, it was built as a widened median for the purpose of being upgraded into a cloverleaf interchange. In the 1980s it actually was built as a cloverleaf, but to the newly installed service roads along Sunrise Highway, which required the elimination of two nearby roadside parking areas.

== Exit list ==
The entire route is in Suffolk County. All exits are unnumbered.

Location	mi	km	Destinations	Notes
Bayport	0.00	0.00	CR 85 (Montauk Highway)	Southern terminus; at-grade intersection; former NY 27A
Bayport–Holbrook line	1.50	2.41	NY 27 (Sunrise Highway) / NY 454 west – New York, Montauk, Commack, MacArthur Airport	NY 454 not signed; exit 51 on NY 27
Holbrook	2.00	3.22	Southern end of freeway section	
Holbrook	2.81	4.52	CR 19 (Patchogue–Holbrook Road) – Patchogue, Holbrook	
Holbrook	4.31	6.94	Furrows Road (CR 90)	
Holtsville	4.48	7.21	Union Avenue	Right-in/right-out connections only
Holtsville	4.72– 4.95	7.60– 7.97	I-495 (Long Island Expressway) – New York, Riverhead, Nassau County	Cloverleaf interchange; exit 62 on I-495
Farmingville	5.92	9.53	CR 16 (Portion Road) – Farmingville, Lake Ronkonkoma	
Farmingville	6.05	9.74	Horseblock Place	Right-in/right-out connections only
Selden	6.74	10.85	Northern end of freeway section	
Centereach	7.83	12.60	NY 25 (Middle Country Road) – Riverhead, Smithtown	
Lake Grove	11.11	17.88	NY 347 (Nesconset Highway) – Hauppauge, Port Jefferson	At-grade intersection
Stony Brook	14.29	23.00	NY 25A (North Country Road)	Northern terminus; at-grade intersection
1.000 mi = 1.609 km; 1.000 km = 0.621 mi: Incomplete access
