= Speonk, New York =

Hamlet in New York, United States

Coordinates: 40°49′11″N 72°42′27″W

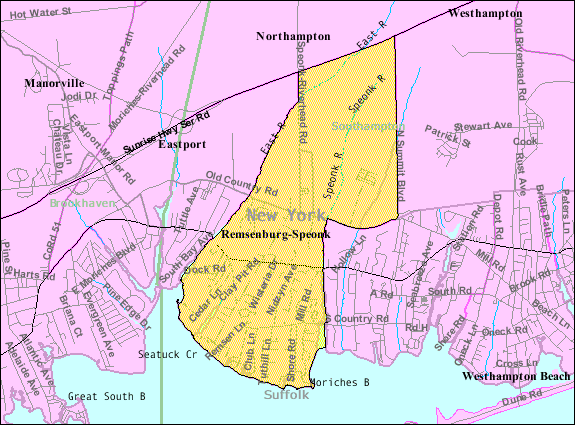

Speonk (/ˈspiːɒŋk/, SPEE-ongk) is a hamlet located in the Town of Southampton, Suffolk County, New York, United States.

== History ==
As early as 1712, meadows in Speonk were leased to cattle owners from Southampton. Most of the early residents came west from Southampton and Bridgehampton in the 1740s, building farms and clearing the forests of wood. In the 1880s, duck farms thrived in Speonk, but few survived past the turn of the century. The name Speonk was inspired by a Native American word meaning high place. An 1897 Long Island Rail Road catalog listed Speonk, noting that that name "certainly sounds like the call of a frog." Railroad conductors frequently accentuated the name when calling it out as the next station. Some residents pressed to change the name to Remsenburg, after prominent resident Charles Remsen donated a new Presbyterian Church. Today, both names remain in use, each covering different areas of the community.

== Geography ==
Speonk is located at geographic coordinates 40° 49' 8.0688" N, 72° 42' 26.2008" W (40.818908, -72.707278). The ZIP Code for Speonk is 11972.

== In popular culture ==
The Lovin' Spoonful recorded a song called "Big Noise From Speonk" on their 1966 album Daydream.

David Leavitt wrote a short story called "Speonk," collected in The Marble Quilt (2001).
