= New York's 3rd State Assembly district =

American legislative district

Assemblymember
Joe DeStefano; R–Medford

New York's 3rd State Assembly district is one of the 150 districts in the New York State Assembly. It has been represented by Joe DeStefano since 2019.

== Geography ==
=== 2020s ===
District 3 is located entirely within Suffolk County. It includes portions of the town of Brookhaven, including the villages of Bellport, Mastic Beach, East Patchogue, Farmingville, Shirley, Medford, Middle Island, Ridge, Yaphank and the hamlet of Brookhaven.

The district overlaps New York's 1st and 2nd congressional districts, and the 1st and 3rd districts of the New York State Senate.

=== 2010s ===
District 3 is located entirely within Suffolk County. It includes portions of the town of Brookhaven, including the villages of Bellport, Mastic Beach, East Patchogue, Coram, Farmingville, Gordon Heights, Shirley, Medford, Middle Island, and Ridge.

== Recent election results ==
=== 2026 ===
2026 New York State Assembly election, District 3
Party	Candidate	Votes	%
Republican	Joe DeStefano		
Conservative	Joe DeStefano		
Total	Joe DeStefano (incumbent)		
Democratic	Joshua Slaughter		
Working Families	Joshua Slaughter		
Total	Joshua Slaughter		
Write-in			
Total votes			

=== 2024 ===
2024 New York State Assembly election, District 3
Party	Candidate	Votes	%
Republican	Joe DeStefano	28,626	
Conservative	Joe DeStefano	4,008	
Total	Joe DeStefano (incumbent)	32,634	60.3
Democratic	Trina Miles	21,451	39.7
Write-in		14	0.0
Total votes		54,099	100.0
Republican hold			

=== 2022 ===
2022 New York State Assembly election, District 3
Party	Candidate	Votes	%
Republican	Joe DeStefano	22,020	
Conservative	Joe DeStefano	3,606	
Total	Joe DeStefano (incumbent)	25,626	63.8
Democratic	Trina Miles	14,555	36.2
Write-in		6	0.0
Total votes		40,187	100.0
Republican hold			

=== 2020 ===
2020 New York State Assembly election, District 3
Party	Candidate	Votes	%
Republican	Joe DeStefano	26,843	
Conservative	Joe DeStefano	3,277	
Independence	Joe DeStefano	686	
Total	Joe DeStefano (incumbent)	30,806	56.5
Democratic	Steven Polgar	23,266	42.7
Libertarian	Adam Martin	420	0.8
Write-in		16	0.0
Total votes		54,508	100.0
Republican hold			

=== 2018 ===
2018 New York State Assembly election, District 3
Party	Candidate	Votes	%
Republican	Joe DeStefano	18,068	
Conservative	Joe DeStefano	2,099	
Independence	Joe DeStefano	645	
Reform	Joe DeStefano	104	
Total	Joe DeStefano	20,916	54.0
Democratic	Clyde Parker	17,822	46.0
Write-in		8	0.0
Total votes		38,746	100.0
Republican hold			

=== 2016 ===
2016 New York State Assembly election, District 3
Party	Candidate	Votes	%
Republican	Dean Murray	23,957	
Conservative	Dean Murray	3,560	
Independence	Dean Murray	1,401	
Reform	Dean Murray	169	
Total	Dean Murray (incumbent)	29,087	62.5
Democratic	Gregory Schoen	17,404	37.4
Write-in		20	0.1
Total votes		46,511	100.0
Republican hold			

=== 2014 ===
2014 New York State Assembly election, District 3
Party	Candidate	Votes	%
Republican	Dean Murray	9,386	
Conservative	Dean Murray	2,271	
Independence	Dean Murray	576	
Total	Dean Murray	12,233	51.1
Democratic	Edward Hennessey	10,352	
Working Families	Edward Hennessey	2,271	
Total	Edward Hennessey (incumbent)	11,709	48.9
Write-in		9	0.4
Total votes		23,951	100.0
Republican gain from Democratic			

=== 2012 ===
2012 New York State Assembly election, District 134
Party	Candidate	Votes	%
Democratic	Edward Hennessey	19,379	50.3
Republican	Dean Murray	14,830	
Conservative	Dean Murray	3,134	
Independence	Dean Murray	1,153	
Total	Dean Murray (incumbent)	19,117	49.6
Write-in		16	0.1
Total votes		38,512	100.0
Democratic gain from Republican			

=== 2010 ===
2010 New York State Assembly election, District 3
Party	Candidate	Votes	%
Republican	Dean Murray	13,068	
Conservative	Dean Murray	3,070	
School Tax Relief	Dean Murray	383	
Total	Dean Murray (incumbent)	16,521	53.3
Democratic	Robert Calarco	12,311	
Working Families	Robert Calarco	1,258	
Independence	Robert Calarco	924	
Total	Robert Calarco	14,493	46.7
Write-in		9	0.0
Total votes		31,024	100.0
Republican hold			

=== 2010 special ===
2010 New York State Assembly special election, District 3
Party	Candidate	Votes	%
Republican	Dean Murray	3,305	
Conservative	Dean Murray	886	
School Tax Relief	Dean Murray	205	
Total	Dean Murray	4,396	50.9
Democratic	Lauren Thoden	3,513	
Independence	Lauren Thoden	487	
Working Families	Lauren Thoden	236	
Total	Lauren Thoden	4,236	49.1
Write-in		0	0.0
Total votes		8,632	100.0
Republican gain from Democratic			
