= Manor St. George =

Tract of land on Long Island, New York

Coordinates: 40°45′21.9″N 72°52′50.9″W

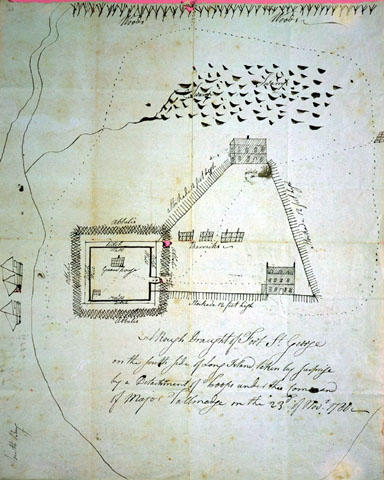
The Manor St. George as sketched for Benjamin Tallmadge during the Revolutionary War

Manor St. George or St. George's Manor was a large tract of land purchased by William "Tangier" Smith in the 17th century on Long Island, in central Suffolk County, New York. Parts of the original parcel, which was approximately 64,000 acres (260 km^{2}) of land, are preserved in bits and pieces: 127 acres (0.51 km^{2}) and the main house and buildings are called the Manor of St. George and located in Shirley; 35 acres (0.14 km^{2}) and another house are called the Longwood Estate and located in Ridge; and 35 acres (0.14 km^{2}) became part of the William Floyd Estate.

The Museum Manor of St. George is in a testamentary trust set up underneath the last will and testament of the late Eugenie A.T. Smith. The management of the manor rest with the trustees. The purpose of the private trust is to promote the Smith family history dating back to 1683. The Longwood Estate (sometimes called the Smith Estate) is maintained by the Town of Brookhaven, and the Floyd Estate is maintained by the National Park Service. The hamlet of Manorville also derives its name from Manor St. George.

Manor St. George originally stretched from the Yaphank Line at the west, a line extending northward to the middle of the island from the head of Yaphank Creek, to the edge of Southampton Town in the east, and from the Atlantic Ocean in the south to around present-day New York State Route 25 in the north.

== History ==
=== British Colonial New York ===
The patent for Manor St. George was granted to Col. William "Tangier" Smith in 1693 in recognition of Col. Smith's being mayor of Tangier in Africa. Further patents issuing more land were granted in 1697 and annexed to the first patent. Col. Smith already owned a homestead in Setauket, New York, and it was from there that he administered his land early on. An additional patent was also issued to Col. Smith in 1697, the Moriches Patent, but not annexed to Manor St. George. In time, the northwestern section of the estate was known as "the Swamp" or "Longswamp."

On Col. Wm. "Tangier" Smith's death in 1705, the Setauket estate was inherited by his eldest surviving son, Col. Henry Smith, and Manor St. George was inherited by another son, Major William Henry Smith, who built the manor seat on Mastic Neck.

In or around 1718, 4,000 acres (16 km^{2}) of the estate on the eastern side of Mastic Neck were acquired by Richard Floyd, who gave it to his son Nicoll. In 1755 the Floyd Estate was given to son William Floyd, a signer of the Declaration of Independence.

On Major William Henry Smith's death in 1743, his son Judge William Smith inherited Manor St. George.

=== American Revolution ===
See also Battle of Fort St. George, for more information

During the American Revolution, British loyalist soldiers occupied the manor house on Mastic Neck and built a fort there. It is possible that Judge Smith, a patriot, fled to Longswamp during the occupation, but this is not documented. In 1780, Major Benjamin Tallmadge landed his dragoons at Cedar Beach in Mt. Sinai on the north shore of Long Island and led them on a march to the manor. The raid began around 4 a.m., and the Americans under Tallmadge captured the fort relatively quickly. Seven British soldiers were killed, but only one American was injured. Major Tallmadge's march, a twenty-mile (32 km) journey, is survived in the form of the Tallmadge Trail. Then called the Medal of Merit, the first Purple Heart in American history was earned by Sgt. Elijah Churchill of the 2nd regiment of light dragoons.

=== After the American Revolution ===
After the Revolutionary War, the Smith family returned to the Manor. Also, Judge Smith had a house built for his son, Gen. John Smith, in Longswamp. Gen. Smith decided not to move into the new house, though, staying at Manor St. George. Longswamp was given to Judge Smith's seventh son, William, in 1790. On July 8, 1817, Longswamp was handed down to William Smith's son, William Sydney Smith, who changed the name to Longwood.

Throughout the following time, Manor St. George and Longwood would be divided many times as parts were sold and parts were divided amongst children of the Smiths.

In 1955, Manor St. George was set up in a testamentary trust by Eugenie Annie Tangier Smith. In the same year, the Longwood Estate was given to Elbert "Burt" Clayton Smith of Berkeley, California who moved his family to the estate immediately. Burt Smith donated 51 acres (0.21 km^{2}) of the estate to the local board of education to build Longwood High School, 6 acres (24,000 m^{2}) to Middle Island Presbyterian Church (which moved to the plot in Ridge, but kept "Middle Island" in the title), 2 acres (8,100 m^{2}) to St. Mark's Lutheran Church (which no longer exists), and several acres to Suffolk County for the greenbelt. When Burt Smith died in 1967, Longwood was bought by real estate developers and destined for destruction. After another real estate developer, Wilbur F. Breslin, proposed a huge residential, industrial, and commercial complex on the site, public outcry was enough that the house and 35 acres (0.14 km^{2}) were donated to Brookhaven Town for preservation in 1974.

== Current uses ==
The Museum Manor of St George is open to the public free of charge from May 1 to October 30. The Longwood Estate is used as parkland, open to the public, and contain a museum.

== Resources and external links ==
- The Manor of St. George by John B. Deitz
- The Illustrated History of the Moriches Bay Area by Van and Mary Field
- The Longwood Estate by Jean Lauer
- Manor St. George from a website about the Carman family
- Things to Do in Brookhaven
- Photos of the Longwood Estate
