= Patricia Eddington =

American politician

Town Clerk of Brookhaven, New York
- Incumbent
- Assumed office 2010

Member of the New York State Assembly from the 3rd district
- In office 2001–2009
- Preceded by: Debra J. Mazzarelli
- Succeeded by: L. Dean Murray

Personal details
- Born: 1947 or 1948 (age 77–78) Queens, New York
- Party: Democratic
- Other political affiliations: Working Families Party
- Spouse: Jack Eddington
- Children: two: Kerri, Brian
- Education: Suffolk County Community College; SUNY Stony Brook
- Website: PatriciaEddington.com

Patricia A. Eddington (born 1947/1948) served from 2001 through 2009 in the New York State Assembly, representing District 3 which comprises Patchogue, Medford, Coram and Yaphank, among other neighboring communities within Suffolk County, New York. She stepped down from the Assembly after winning an election for Town Clerk of Brookhaven, New York in November 2009.

== Education and career ==
Eddington received an associate's degree in Women's Studies from Suffolk County Community College. She continued her education at SUNY Stony Brook, earning a bachelor's degree in Political Science and a master's degree from its School of Social Welfare. Eddington is licensed by New York State as a Clinical Social Worker.

She was a social worker for the Islip School District. Eddington served on the Patchogue-Medford Board of Education from 1980 to 1989, after which she served on the Patchogue-Medford Library Board.

Eddington was first elected to the state legislature in 2000, where she was Chairwoman of the Libraries and Education Technology Committee within the Assembly, in addition to serving as a member of the Health, Higher Education and Governmental Operations committees.

She currently serves as Town Clerk for Brookhaven, a position she was elected to in 2009. She is also an associate professor of Philosophy and Women's Studies at Suffolk County Community College.

== Family ==
Eddington resides in Medford, New York. She is married to Suffolk County legislator Jack Eddington. They have two children, Kerri and Brian.

== Election results ==
- November 2000 general election, NYS Assembly, 3rd AD

Patricia A. Eddington (DEM - IND - WOR)	...	21,366
Leah M. Jefferson (REP - CON - RTL)	...	20,730

- November 2002 general election, NYS Assembly, 3rd AD

Patricia A. Eddington (DEM - IND - WOR)	...	14,222
Lee Snead (REP - CON - RTL)	...	13,141

- November 2004 general election, NYS Assembly, 3rd AD

Patricia A. Eddington (DEM - IND - WOR)	...	29,360
Frederick Hall (REP - CON)	...	16,747

- November 2006 general election, NYS Assembly, 3rd AD

Patricia A. Eddington (DEM - IND - WOR)	...	17,037
Scott J. Salimando (REP - CON)	...	9,819

- November 2008 general election, NYS Assembly, 3rd AD

Patricia A. Eddington (DEM - IND - WOR)	...	30,334
Scott J. Salimando (REP - CON)	...	16,512

New York State Assembly
Preceded by Debra J. Mazzarelli	New York State Assembly, 3rd District; 2001–2009	Succeeded by L. Dean Murray
