= Smith Estate =

Smith Estate may refer to:

- Smith Estate (Los Angeles), California
- Smith Estate (Ridge, New York), listed on the National Register of Historic Places in New York
