= Gordon Heights Fire Department =

Volunteer fire department in Long Island, NY, USA

Gordon Heights Fire District and Volunteer Fire Department
Operational area
- Serves: Portions of Gordon Heights, Medford, Middle Island, and Yaphank, New York

Agency overview
- Established: 1947 (department); 1952 (fire district)

Website
- gordonheightsfiredept.org

The Gordon Heights Fire Department (also known as the Gordon Heights Fire District and Volunteer Fire Department) is a volunteer fire department which is located in and serves much of the hamlets of Gordon Heights, Medford, Middle Island, and Yaphank in the Town of Brookhaven in Suffolk County, on Long Island, in New York, United States. It is the sole fire department within the Gordon Heights Fire District – a special district established for the department and Gordon Heights community by the town in 1952.

== History ==
Prior to the creation of the Gordon Heights Fire Department (GHFD) in 1947, there had been no fire services in the community, dating back to its founding in 1927. Neighboring departments had no obligation to protect Gordon Heights. Following a fire that destroyed a local church, the Civic Association worked toward forming a community fire department, which was incorporated soon after. By 1948, the department had received its first fire truck.

When the fire house became too small, the residents moved toward the creation of a fire district, whereby taxes would be levied and financial assistance would be given for the expansion of the department. Petitions were signed by residents and taken to the Town Board. The Gordon Heights Fire District was thus established by the Town of Brookhaven in 1952. The first commissioners were appointed in 1952–53, and an election was held one year later.

The Gordon Heights Fire District has been at the center of contention in the early 21st century, with some residents concerned that the district has the highest tax rates on Long Island. The district's high residential tax burden is due in part to Gordon Heights lacking a commercial tax base. Opponents also note its small size, serving approximately 900 homes in relation to the surrounding districts that serve between 4,400 and 8,700 households and have a lesser tax burden.

Supporters of the 60-member district note its history as the first Black fire department in New York State and its ability to provide services that larger and busier departments cannot – such as helping elderly residents plow snow during the winter months.

An attempt to dissolve the fire district in 2006 – largely due to these tax burdens – was rejected by the Town of Brookhaven on the grounds that the petition format was incorrect. A second petition to dissolve the Gordon Heights Fire District was filed for similar reasons on December 31, 2008. These attempts, too, were ultimately unsuccessful, and the department is still active as of 2026.

== See also ==
- Fort Johnson Volunteer Fire Company
