= L. Dean Murray =

American politician (born 1964)

Dean Murray
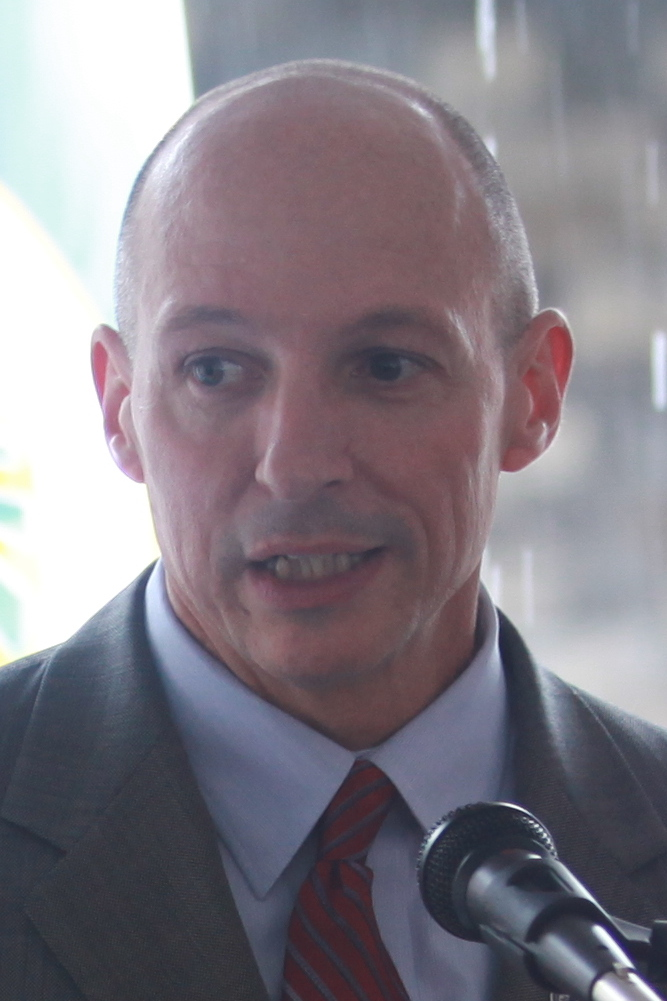

Member of the New York State Senate from the 3rd district
- Incumbent
- Assumed office January 1, 2023
- Preceded by: Phil Boyle (redistricting)

Member of the New York Assembly from the 3rd district
- In office January 1, 2015 – December 31, 2018
- Preceded by: Edward J. Hennessey
- Succeeded by: Joe DeStefano
- In office February 9, 2010 – January 1, 2013
- Preceded by: Patricia Eddington
- Succeeded by: Edward J. Hennessey

Personal details
- Born: Leonard Dean Murray; July 22, 1964 (age 62) Washington, D.C.
- Party: Republican
- Education: Broadcasting Institute of Maryland
- Website: Official website

L. Dean Murray (born July 22, 1964) is an American politician and former Republican member of the New York State Assembly, representing the assembly's third district from 2010 to 2013 and again from 2015 to 2019. The district includes portions of the town of Brookhaven, including Bellport and Mastic Beach in Suffolk County on Long Island. Dean Murray was recently elected to serve in the New York State Senate after the 2022 elections.

Murray had described himself as being the first Tea Party activist to be elected to office.

== Life and early career ==
Murray is a Maryland native who graduated from the Broadcasting Institute of Maryland. He started his career by spending ten years in the radio and television news industry, during which he covered the Pennsylvania State Capitol and served on the board of directors of the Pennsylvania Associated Press. He was later a regional sales manager and advertising sales representative for TCI Cable. Murray has been the owner of Suffolk County-based D & S Advertising Inc. since 1997.

Murray resides in East Patchogue, New York; he previously lived in Coram, New York for 15 years. He is divorced and has one son, Anthony.

== Political career ==
In 2009, Murray ran for Suffolk County Legislature in Suffolk County's 7th Legislative District. He was defeated by incumbent Jack Eddington.

On February 9, 2010, Murray won a special election, winning the New York State Assembly seat previously held by Assemblywoman Patricia Eddington. Murray defeated Lauren Thoden by 160 votes. Murray was re-elected in the 2010 general election. After serving one full term, he was defeated by Edward J. Hennessey, a Democrat, by 226 votes in the General Election on November 6, 2012.

In a re-match in 2014, it was revealed during the campaign that Dean Murray's campaign committee surreptitiously planted a GPS device on New York State Assemblyman Edward Hennessey's car and secretly tracked him for two months. A witness also testified that he personally performed surveillance on Hennessey's home and family, tracking cars and their movements in an effort to continuously ascertain Hennessey's whereabouts. Dean Murray used this information to file a petition to disprove Assemblyman Hennessey's residency and knock him off the ballot. The petition was dismissed by State Supreme Court Justice Arthur Pitt In a tight race, Murray defeated Hennessey by 526 votes. Murray was re-elected in 2016.

In 2018, Murray opted not to run for re–election. Instead, he ran for state senate, and was defeated by Monica Martinez.

Election history
| Location | Year | Election | Results |
|---|---|---|---|
| Suffolk County District 7 | 2009 | General | √ Jack Eddington (I) 51.74% Dean Murray (R) 48.26% |
| New York Assembly District 3 | 2010 | Special | √ L. Dean Murray (R) 50.93% Laura Thoden (D) 49.07% |
| New York Assembly District 3 | 2010 | General | √ L. Dean Murray (R) 53.25% Robert Calarco (D) 46.72% |
| New York Assembly District 3 | 2012 | General | √ Edward Hennessey (D) 50.32% L. Dean Murray (R) 49.68% |
| New York Assembly District 3 | 2016 | General | √ L. Dean Murray (R); Gregory D. Schoen (D) |
| New York Senate District 3 | 2018 | General | √ Monica R. Martinez; L. Dean Murray (R) |
