= Bryant Neal Vinas =

American terrorist (born 1982)

- Born: December 4, 1982 (age 43); Queens, New York
- Other names: Ibrahim; Bashir al-Ameriki; and Ben Yameen al-Kanadeeis
- Occupation: Truck driver
- Parent(s): Juan Vinas (father); Maria Luisa Uraga Vinas (mother); Rosa Gutierrez (stepmother)
- Convictions: Sentenced (May 2017)
- Criminal charges: i) conspiracy to murder U.S. nationals; ii) providing material support to al-Qaeda; and iii) providing "expert advice and assistance" (in relation to information about the LIRR)
- Penalty: 3 months in prison in addition to time previously served

Bryant Neal Vinas (born December 4, 1982; also Ibrahim, Bashir al-Ameriki and Ben Yameen al-Kanadeeis) is an American convicted of participating in and supporting al-Qaeda plots in Afghanistan and the U.S.

After converting to Islam in 2004, he traveled to Waziristan, Pakistan, in 2007 with the intention of meeting and joining a jihadist group to fight U.S. soldiers in Afghanistan. He was accepted into al-Qaeda and received training in general combat and military explosives.

He also volunteered detailed information about the operation of the Long Island Rail Road (LIRR) system to a senior al-Qaeda leader to help plan a bomb attack on an LIRR commuter train in New York's Penn Station. Subsequently, he participated in two al-Qaeda rocket attacks on U.S. soldiers in Afghanistan in September 2008.

He was captured by Pakistani forces in 2008 and transferred to FBI custody. In January 2009, he pleaded guilty to all three charges against him.

After cooperating with law enforcement and testifying in two European terrorism trials, Vinas was sentenced in May 2017 to three months in prison additionally to the time that he had already served. He will remain under tight supervision for the rest of his life.

== Early life ==
Vinas lived on Long Island, with his parents and his sister, Lina. His parents had both immigrated to the U.S., his mother from Argentina and his father, now a retired engineer, from Peru. A one-time Boy Scout who grew up in Medford, New York, Vinas was raised Catholic.

His parents divorced in 2000. Vinas graduated from Longwood High School in Middle Island, New York, in 2000. He joined the U.S. Army at age 18 in 2001, but was discharged after just three weeks of basic training at Fort Jackson in South Carolina.

While first living with his mother in Medford, Vinas had a dispute with her and moved in with his father in Patchogue, New York, in approximately 2005. He worked as a licensed truck driver and at a car wash, and sporadically attended technical college.

=== Conversion to Islam ===
He converted to Islam in 2004, and is a member of the Salafi methodology. He attended the Islamic Association of Long Island, a local Selden, New York, mosque, most members of which are Pakistani. He attended the mosque regularly from approximately 2004/05 until late 2007, and began going by the name "Ibrahim" there.

Mosque president Nayyar Imam said he talked regularly to FBI and Homeland Security officials and that he kept "an eye like a hawk on this place". On the other hand, a former FBI counter-terrorism official said "there could be a person in the mosque who has some radical thoughts and ideas who the imam knows nothing about", and that suspected extremists had in fact been identified at the mosque. Vinas began wearing Islamic robes and a skullcap, immersed himself in the Koran and studying Arabic, brought three Pakistani friends from the mosque to his father's home on one occasion, and encouraged his father to consider converting to Islam. Law enforcement officials believe he was radicalized through the internet, as his confiscated computer revealed that while in the U.S. he had visited jihadist websites.

In September 2007, he quit his job and abruptly left his father's home, saying he wanted to study Islam and Arabic.

== Taliban and al-Qaeda ==
=== Taliban ===
On September 10, 2007, Vinas traveled to Lahore, Pakistan, intending to join a jihadist group which fought U.S. soldiers in Afghanistan. Three of his Pakistani friends in New York helped him plan his trip. He also traveled to Peshwar, Pakistan, to have a doctor amputate the little toe of his right foot due to an unspecified ailment.

=== Al-Qaeda training camp ===
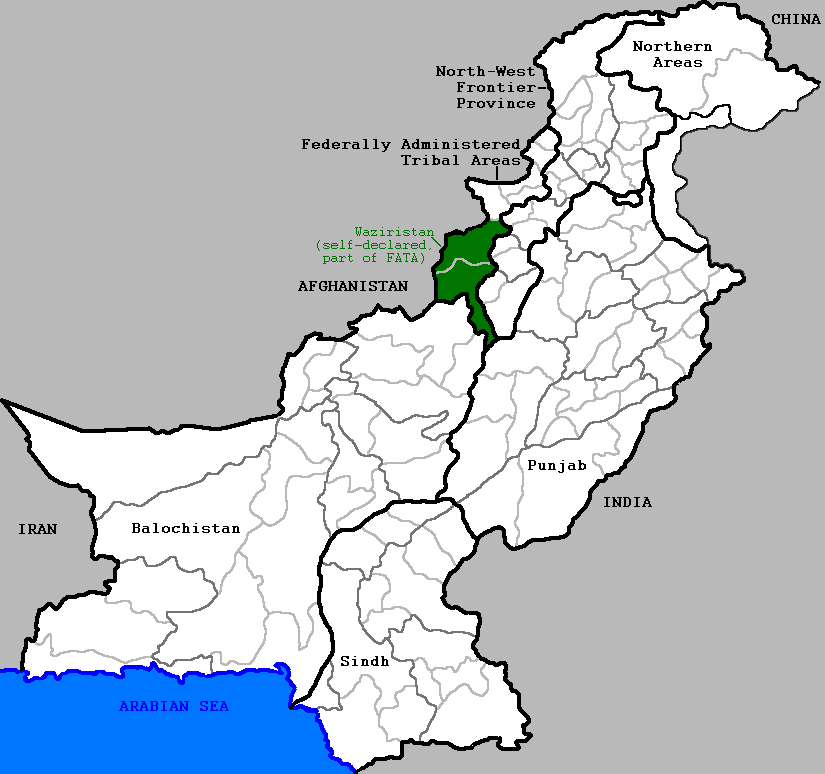
Map of Pakistan and Waziristan

Later in 2007, he traveled to Waziristan, Pakistan. He made contact with members of al-Qaeda from Yemen and Saudi Arabia and its leadership, and with "a good reference" was accepted into al-Qaeda.

He received "military type training" in the Waziristan's al-Qaeda camp between March and August 2008. During intake, he filled out an information form, listed his relatives, handed his passport over, and adopted an alias.

His training included "courses" in general combat, firearms (the AK-47, machine gun, and pistol), rocket-propelled grenades, a 15-day course in military explosives theory and assembly (including TNT, C4, voltmeters, and suicide belts), and a course in assassination and silencers. Ten to twenty other students were in his classes. There were other classes offered in forgery, poison, and "advanced bombs". The trainees' performance was evaluated in writing and the reports kept in their personnel file. He lived in safe houses with trainees from Europe and Turkey, and learned Arabic, Dari, and Urdu. He agreed to become a suicide bomber, but his handlers eventually decided that he needed more indoctrination and training.

Vinas took part with other masked fighters in an al-Qaeda propaganda video featuring Abu Yahya al-Libi, a leader and frequent spokesman. He also had contact with Rashid Rauf, a Pakistani/British member reportedly involved in the 2006 transatlantic aircraft plot to bring down U.S. flights.

==== Najibullah Zazi ====
Vinas met Najibullah Zazi in Pakistan in 2008. Zazi, from Queens, had also traveled to Pakistan (flying with friends to Peshawar in August 2008) to join the Taliban and fight against the U.S. military and its allies in Afghanistan.

In Peshawar, he and his friends were instead recruited by al-Qaeda, and taken to a training camp in Waziristan. Zazi also underwent weapons and explosives training there in 2008. Al-Qaeda leaders also discussed target locations in New York City with Zazi, including the New York City subway systems. Zazi returned to the U.S. in January 2009. He was arrested in September 2009, accused of planning suicide bombings during rush hour on the New York City Subway, and has pleaded guilty.

=== Plot to bomb Penn Station; rocket attacks ===
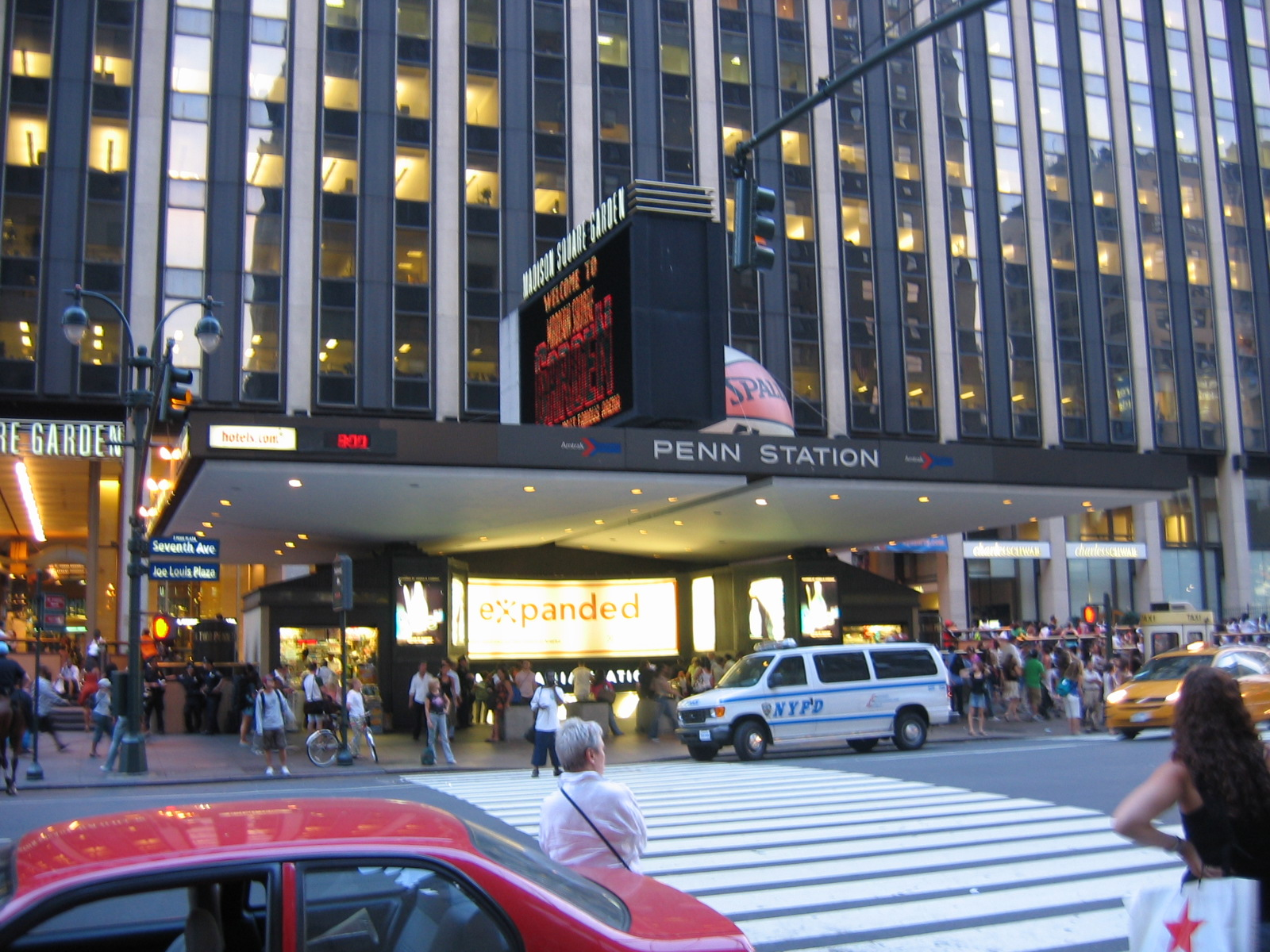
Penn Station in New York

He provided detailed information about the operation of the New York City transit system and the Long Island Rail Road (LIRR) system, communications equipment and personnel to a senior al-Qaeda leader between March and November 2008. He had gleaned the information as a frequent rider on the LIRR.

The purpose was to help plan a bomb attack on an LIRR commuter train in New York's Penn Station. His later admission of a plot to blow up an LIRR train inside Penn Station triggered a U.S. security alert over the 2008 Thanksgiving holiday.

Subsequently, he participated at the direction of al-Qaeda in two rocket attacks on U.S. soldiers in Afghanistan in September 2008. Both attacks failed.

== Arrest ==
He traveled again to Peshwar, Pakistan, in October 2008, this time in search of a wife, and to buy supplies and use the internet. It was there that he was captured in November 2008 by Pakistani troops, guided by U.S. agents who had been tracking him. He was transferred to FBI custody and began cooperating with authorities.

== Charges and guilty plea ==
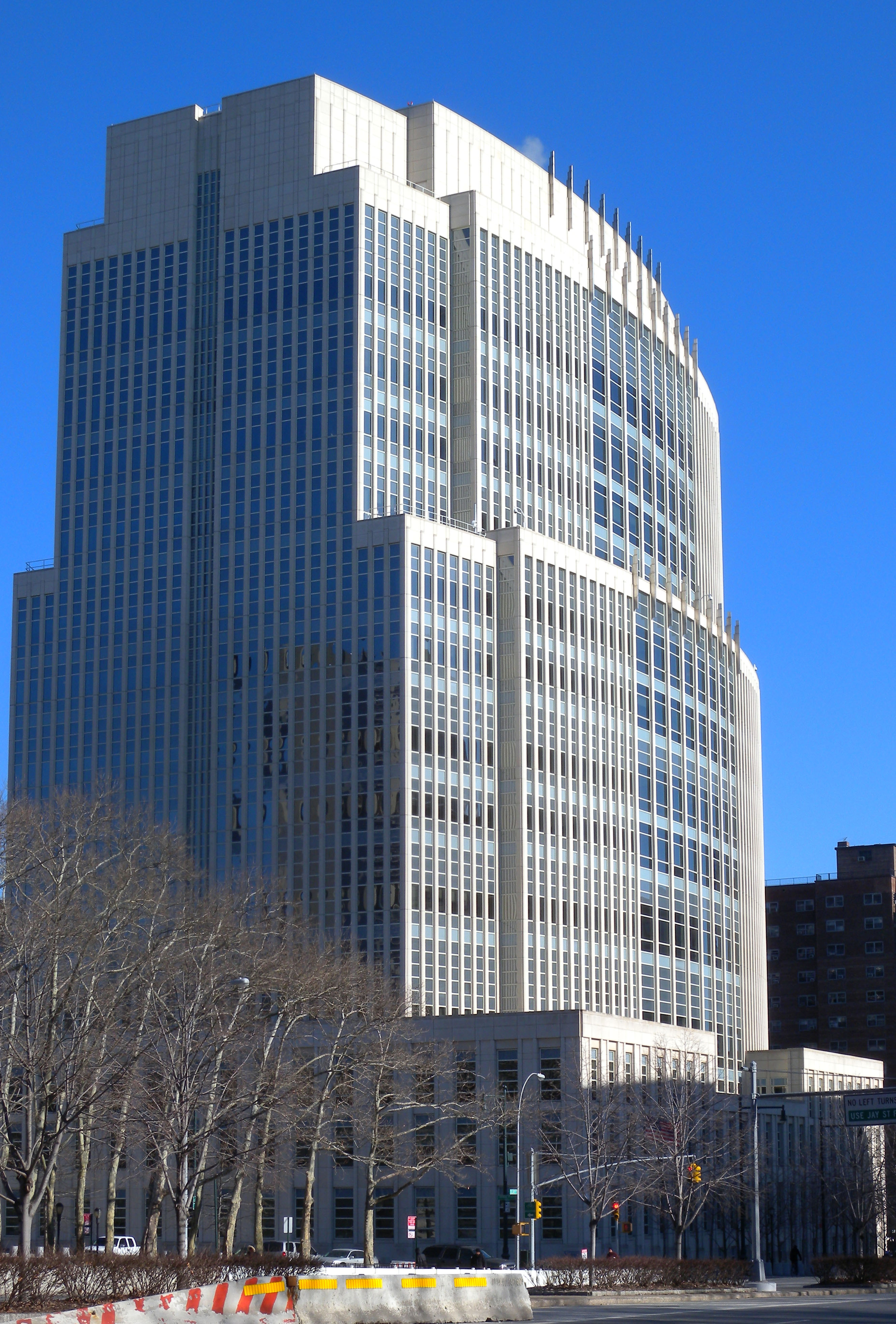
Brooklyn federal courthouse

Vinas was charged with conspiracy to murder U.S. nationals, providing material support to al-Qaeda, and providing "expert advice and assistance" (in relation to the information about the LIRR). The charges carried a maximum penalty of life in prison.

He originally pleaded "not guilty". But he switched and pleaded guilty to all three charges on January 28, 2009, in United States District Court in the Eastern District of New York before Judge Nicholas G. Garaufis.

=== Cooperation ===
Vinas has cooperated with law enforcement and intelligence officials, providing information and playing the role of key prosecution witness in at least two terrorism trials in Europe.

In these trials, his testimony has linked suspects to al-Qaeda training camps and the terrorist network. He has also provided information about the structure and operations of al-Qaeda, according to intelligence officials. As a speaker of Arabic, Dari, and Urdu who had contact with al-Qaeda leadership and participated in training, he is familiar with the organization.

The cooperation from Vinas has been described as a major intelligence progress in understanding the process of Western-born potential jihadists getting through to terrorist training in remote areas of Pakistan. As of July 2009, he was reported to be in the custody of United States Marshals in an undisclosed location in New York State.

=== Reaction ===
"He's not my son no more", said Maria Luisa Uraga, his mother. "I don't know him if he's able to do this. He has no family anymore."

== Sentencing ==
In May 2017, Vinas was sentenced to three months in prison in addition to the time that he had already served. Judge Nicholas Garaufis described that decision as difficult, noting the need to balance the weight of his crimes and his extremely valuable cooperation that allowed the government to disrupt al-Qaeda activities.

The prosecution contended that an overly harsh sentence would discourage other potential cooperators from agreeing to talk. However, Vinas will remain under tight supervision for the rest of his life.
