= Carmans River =

Coordinates: 40°49′15″N 72°53′27″W

Carmans River Connecticut River
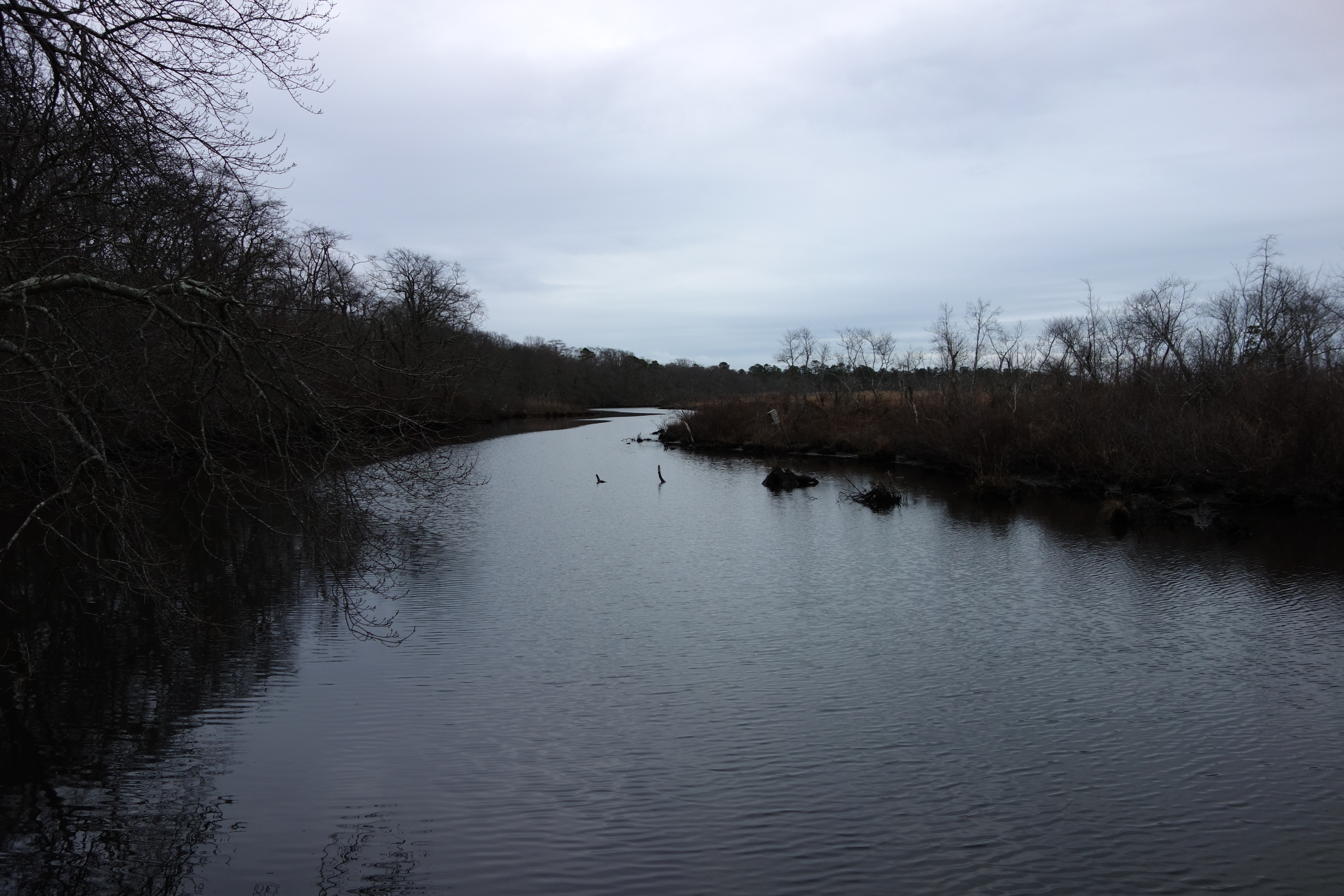
- Carmans River within Wertheim National Wildlife Refuge, L.I., N.Y.

Location
- Country: United States

Physical characteristics
- Source
  - location: Cathedral Pines County Park near Middle Island, New York
  - elevation: Approx. 249 ft (76 m)
- Mouth
  - location: Bellport Bay at Shirley, New York
  - elevation: 0 ft (0 m)
- Length: 10 mi (16 km)
- Basin size: 71 mi^{2} (180 km^{2})
- Discharge
  - average: 21 cubic feet per second (1 m^{3}/s)

The Carmans River is a 10-mile (16 km) long river in Brookhaven, New York in Suffolk County on Long Island.

It is one of the four largest rivers on Long Island and is similar to other Long Island rivers in that is totally groundwater generated (e.g., no lakes), although a lake did exist long ago. Almost all of the river is specifically protected by the Central Long Island Pine Barrens. All of it is designated by New York State as either a "Scenic River" or a "Recreational River."

The river, which was earlier once called the Connecticut River (in connection with early settlers from Connecticut, and also due to the mistaken belief that it is fed underground by that river) is named for Samuel Carman who married into milling families on the river in the 19th century, used it to run a mill, and operated a hunting club for residents from New York City.

It is fresh water for the first eight miles (13 km) and then becomes an estuary for the last two, as it encounters the tidal effects of Great South Bay.

There are four dams on the upper river at Upper Mill Pond, Lower Mill Pond, Southaven County Park, and the Sunrise Highway.

Adjoining the river at its southern end is the Wertheim National Wildlife Refuge.

The river formed the western boundary of the massive Manor St. George under William "Tangier" Smith who in the 17th century owned most of modern-day Brookhaven south of the Sunrise Highway. A manor subsequently built by the Smith family is located in Shirley at the mouth.

In 1967 Art Cooley, a teacher at Bellport High School, noting a decline in the osprey population on the river was one of the founders of the Environmental Defense Fund which was to lead the fight to ban DDT.

Southaven County Park encompasses upstream parts of the river and special regulations trout fishing can be accessed through them. In recent years, wild turkeys have been re-introduced into this park, and have re-populated many of the surrounding areas.

== List of crossings of the Carmans River ==
Crossings	Carries	Location	Coordinates
Unnamed road bridge	Cathedral Pines County Park entrance	Middle Island	
Unnamed road bridge	East Bartlett Road	Middle Island	
Upper Yaphank Lake Dam	Footpath to Yaphank Beach	Yaphank	'
Unnamed road bridge	Mill Road (a.k.a.; Coram−Yaphank Road)	Yaphank	'
Lower Yaphank Lake Dam	CR 21 (Yaphank Avenue)	Yaphank	
Unnamed Road bridge	I-495 (Long Island Expressway)	Yaphank	
Unnamed railroad bridge	Main Line of the Long Island Rail Road	Yaphank	
Unnamed road bridge and dam	CR 56 (Victory Boulevard)	South Haven and Shirley	
Unnamed road bridge	NY 27 (Sunrise Highway)	South Haven and Shirley	
Unnamed road bridge	CR 80 (Montauk Highway)	South Haven and Shirley	
Unnamed railroad bridge	Montauk Branch of the Long Island Rail Road	South Haven and Shirley	
Unnamed road bridge	Wertheim National Wildlife Refuge access road	South Haven and Shirley	
