= Artist Lake =

Lake in New York, United States

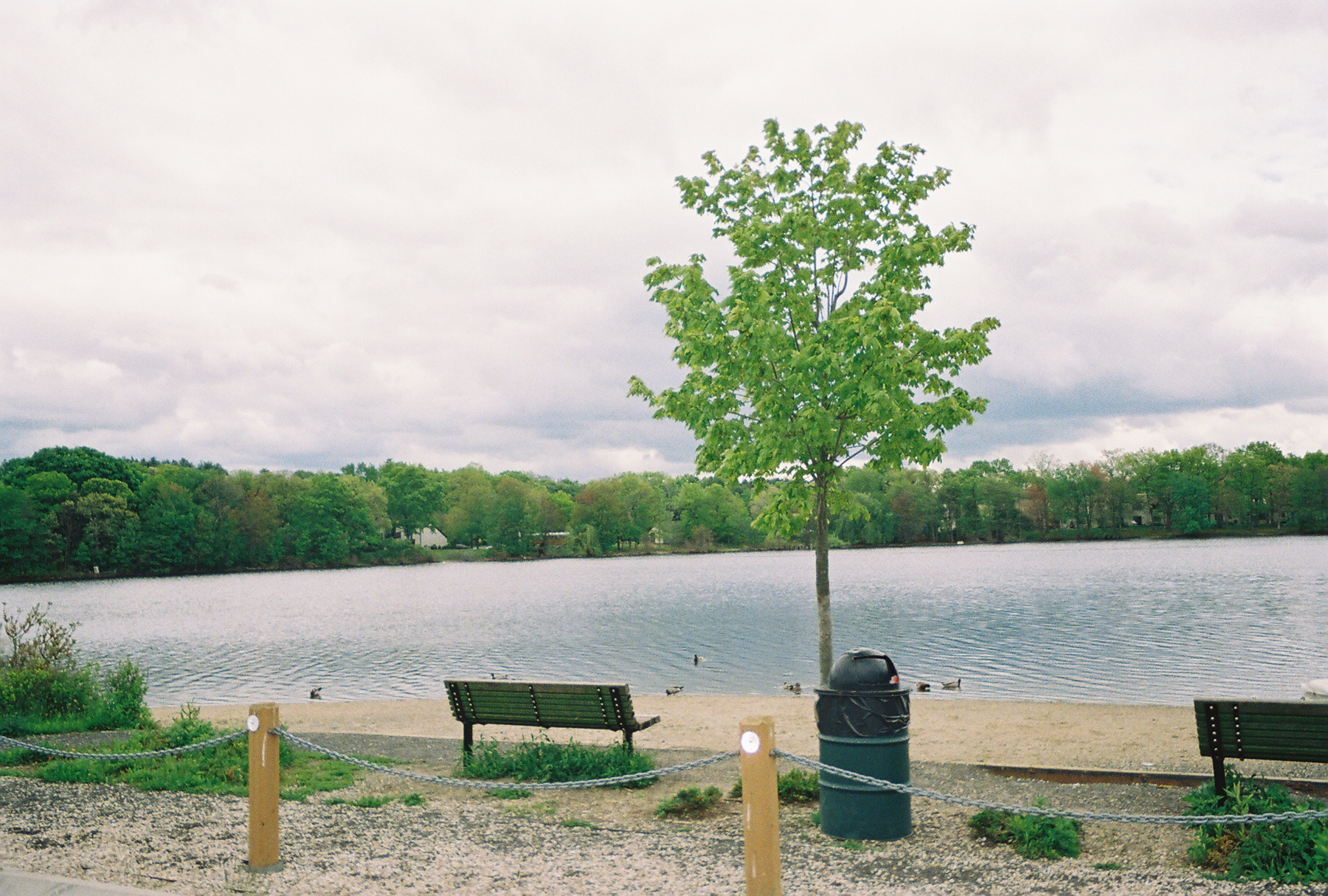

- Location within New York Location within the United States
- Location: Middle Island, Suffolk County, New York
- Coordinates: 40°53′02″N 72°55′53″W
- Primary inflows: Ground water
- Basin countries: United States
- Surface area: 30 acres (12 ha)
- Max. depth: 9 ft (2.7 m)
- Surface elevation: 10 ft (3.0 m)

Artist Lake is a glacial kettle hole lake located in Middle Island, New York south of Middle Country Road (Route 25) in central Long Island.

Artist Lake holds a diverse warm water fish community including largemouth bass and pickerel. It is also one of Long Island's better waters for crappie and perch.

Species present (naturally reproducing):

- Largemouth bass
- Chain pickerel
- Bluegill
- Pumpkinseed
- Black crappie
- Yellow perch
- White perch
- Brown bullhead

Access is via Town of Brookhaven's park located directly off of Middle Country Road.

Directions: Take Route 25 to Middle Island; lake is on the south side of the road opposite of what used to be Kmart.

Restrictions: Hand launched boats are allowed; shoreline access is available but limited.

Artist Lake has an irregular shape that was formed by the melting of massive chunks of partially buried glacial ice. A lake formed this way is called a kettlehole. Artist Lake has no inlet or outlet streams. Therefore, the water level is determined by groundwater that gradually changes during periods of dry or wet weather.

Artist Lake has three connected basins with a total surface area of 30 acres (120,000 m^{2}). The largest and deepest basin is on the east basin which has a maximum depth of 9 feet (2.7 m). The south and west basins are shallower, particularly the west basin which does not exceed two feet in depth.

Most of the shoreline of Artist Lake is privately owned. Public access is available from Middle Country Road (Route 25). Canoes or other hand carried boats can be launched from a small Brookhaven town park on the south side of the road.

Fishing from shore is also possible. There is room for five or six cars to pull off the highway.

Artist Lake is located on NYS Route 25 in Middle Island just east of Suffolk County Route 21.

== See also ==
- Brookhaven
