= Long Island Shakespeare Festival =

Theatre festival in Long Island

Coordinates: 40.8470101°N 73.0538361°W

The Long Island Shakespeare Festival, co-founded by Charles Townsend Wittreich Jr., is sponsored by Suffolk County Community College to provide Long Island residents and visitors quality professional theatre with emphasis on plays by William Shakespeare. In addition, it serves as a transition for student theatre artists and artisans from Long Island into the business of theatre. Former and current Long Island residents who have created careers in theatre return to the area to perform, direct or design. The Long Island Shakespeare Festival uses the production facilities of the Theatre Training Program at Suffolk Community College on Long Island, New York. The Festival, to foster the appreciation of Shakespearean theatre, makes each showing free of charge.

== Past Productions ==
- Romeo and Juliet
- The Taming of the Shrew
- The Comedy of Errors
- Macbeth
- Twelfth Night, or What You Will
- As You Like It
- A Midsummer Night's Dream
- Much Ado About Nothing
- The Tempest
- The Merry Wives of Windsor
- Much Ado About Nothing
- King Henry V
- Macbeth
- As You Like It
- Three Musketeers

== LISF Alumni ==
- Barrie Ingham, Director, The Taming of the Shrew (deceased)
- Roger Rees (deceased)
- Matt Loney
- Gabe Fazio
- Richard Johnson
- Tiffany LaVoie
- Karen Muscarella
- Nancy Harkins
- Antoine Jones
- Brian Costello
- Adrienne Thompson
- Timothy Gillespie
- Anton Dudley
- Brenna Gwyn Snowe
- Camile Arnone
- Keith G. Fitzgerald
- Louis Felliciardi
- Jessika Kerimian
- Steven Lantz-Gefroh
- Valerie Lantz-Gefroh
- Brian Peters
- Danielle McGovern
- Daniel Guyton, Actor, "Comedy of Errors"
- Liz Bresnak-Arata, Actor, "As You Like It" (Phebe), Romeo and Juliet (Juliet).
- Jack Robert Stone
- Dan O'Reilly
- Nicole Tilford
- MaryBeth Schroeder
- Rob DiSario
- Sheilagh O'Loughlin
- Robert R. Doyle
- John Shivers (deceased)
- Dave Cohen
- James Alexander
- Amanda Abbott
- Krystin Strand
- Emily Prochnicki
- James O'Connor
- Joseph Winchel
- Danielle Guidi
- Gregory Kowlessar
