= Islamic Association of Long Island =

The Islamic Association of Long Island

Religion
- Affiliation: Islam

Location
- Location: 10 Park Hill Drive, Selden, New York
- Interactive map of The Islamic Association of Long Island
- Coordinates: 40.86171°N 73.057298°W

Architecture
- Type: Mosque
- Established: 1974

Website
- seldenmasjid.org

The Islamic Association of Long Island (also known as the Selden Masjid) is a mosque at 10 Park Hill Drive in Selden, New York, eastern Long Island, 65 miles east of New York City. It was founded in 1974 and is the oldest chartered mosque on Long Island.

== Background ==
Islamic Association of Long Island, also known as Selden Masjid, is the first Masjid in Suffolk County, registered with New York state in 1974. The original structure was purchased from a church. However, back in 2012 a new and modern building was built for this house of worship. In addition to various prayer services Selden Masjid provides various community services, including a fully functional food pantry, clothing and shoe donation, various educational programs, etc. Selden Masjid participates in various interfaith community events on a wide variety of topics and issues, including social justice, to create harmony and understanding between communities of faith. Our congregants represent some of highly educated and successful professionals in various sectors of the US economy, including Medicine, Healthcare, Science, Technology, Academia, Engineering, Financial Services, Media, Social Services, Law, Business and Government.

== Controversy ==
=== Alleged Former attendee became al-Qaeda member ===
Bryant Neal Vinas (also known as Ibrahim, Bashir al-Ameriki, and Ben Yameen al-Kanadeeis) is an American who converted to Islam in 2004. He attended the mosque regularly from approximately 2004/05 until 2007, when he left for Pakistan. In Pakistan, he became an al-Qaeda member. He was arrested and pleaded guilty in January 2009 to participating in and supporting al-Qaeda plots, including volunteering detailed information about the operation of the Long Island Rail Road (LIRR) system to a senior al-Qaeda leader, to help plan a bomb attack on an LIRR commuter train in New York's Penn Station.

== See also ==
- List of mosques in the Americas
- Lists of mosques
- List of mosques in the United States
