= Joshua Slaughter =

American politician

Member-elect of the New York State Assembly from the 3rd district
- Assuming office January 2027
- Succeeding: Joe DeStefano

Personal details
- Party: Democratic

Joshua Slaughter is an American politician. A member of the Democratic Party, he is the member-elect for the 3rd district of the New York State Assembly.
