= Ridge, New York =

- Hamlet and census-designated place
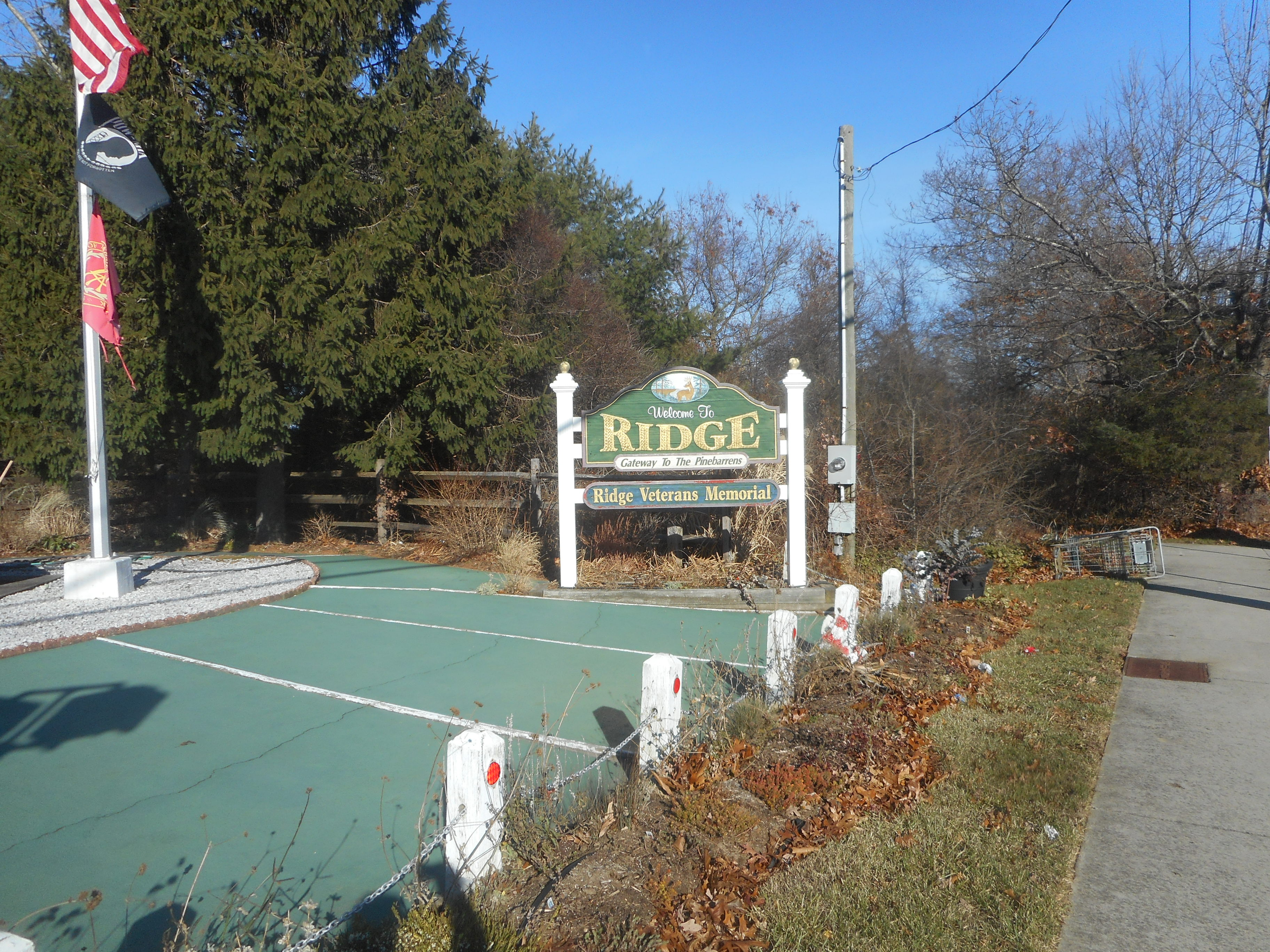
- A Ridge welcome sign at the Ridge Veterans Memorial, on NY 25 and Ridge Road
- Motto: "Gateway to the Pine Barrens"
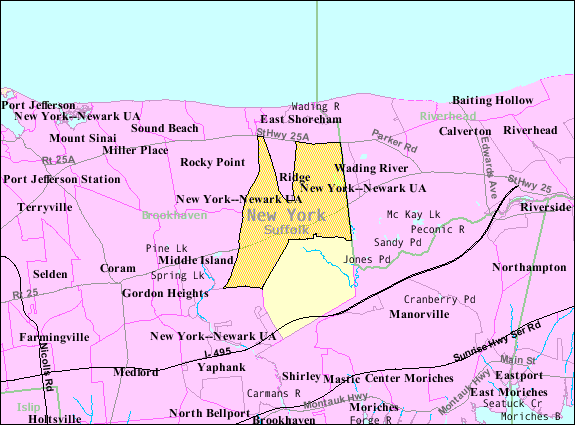
- U.S. Census map

- Location on Long Island Location within the state of New York
- Coordinates: 40°54′26″N 72°52′58″W
- Country: United States
- State: New York
- County: Suffolk
- Town: Brookhaven

Area
  - Total: 13.29 sq mi (34.41 km^{2})
  - Land: 13.19 sq mi (34.17 km^{2})
  - Water: 0.093 sq mi (0.24 km^{2})
- Elevation: 92 ft (28 m)

Population (2020)
  - Total: 13,271
  - Density: 1,006/sq mi (388.4/km^{2})
- Time zone: UTC−05:00 (Eastern Time Zone)
  - Summer (DST): UTC−04:00
- ZIP Code: 11961
- Area codes: 631, 934
- FIPS code: 36-61665
- GNIS feature ID: 0962492

Ridge is a hamlet and census-designated place (CDP) located within the Town of Brookhaven, in Suffolk County, on Long Island, in New York, United States. The population was 13,271 at the time of the 2020 census.

== History ==
=== The Longwood Estate ===
In 1693, William "Tangier" Smith, who owned a homestead in Setauket, was allowed to purchase a large tract of land on the South Shore of Long Island in recognition of his being mayor of Tangier in Africa. The land, called Manor St. George, stretched from the Carmans River (then called the Connecticut River) in the west to the edge of the town of Southampton in the east, with a northern border around present-day New York State Route 25, as much as 81,000 acres (330 km^{2}) of land. He made his manor seat on the South Shore in present-day Mastic, and the northern part, now the south side of Ridge, was called "The Swamp" or "Longswamp". A house wasn't built at Longswamp until after the American Revolution. In 1817, William Sydney Smith inhabited the house and changed the name to Longwood.

In 1955, what then remained of William Smith's original manor was primarily located in Ridge and was surrounded by the world growing up around it, in the form of the Brookhaven National Laboratory and the surrounding areas becoming increasingly populated. Longwood's 750 acres (300 ha) fell into the hands of Elbert Clayton Smith, who immediately moved his family from California to live there. He seems to have been very generous to his new community; his donations included 51 acres (21 ha) to the school board for the construction of Longwood High School and 6 acres (2.4 ha) to Middle Island Presbyterian Church. In 1967, Elbert Smith died, and the Longwood Estate was carved into housing developments and nearly destroyed until enough noise was made about preservation to have the house and 35 acres (14 ha) of land given to the Town of Brookhaven in 1974. The Smith Estate was added to the National Register of Historic Places in 1981.

=== Randallville ===
In 1738, northern Ridge was settled by widower Samuel Randall of North Stonington, Connecticut; his only son Stephen Randall and his descendants farmed a 4,000-acre (1,600 ha) plot of ground that Samuel had always referred to as "the Ridge" based on the geographical terrain. First called "Randallville", Ridge was the name selected by its residents for postal delivery. The Randall burial plot near the William Floyd Parkway includes the grave of Lt. Stephen Randall (1736–1818), patriot of the American Revolution and a Suffolk County Militia veteran of the Battle of Long Island. Graves of Randall's wife Elizabeth Swezey (1747–1834) and several descendants are also within the plot.

== Geography ==
Ridge is located at the northwestern end of the Long Island Central Pine Barrens and is referred to by a sign in the center of the hamlet as the "Gateway to the Pine Barrens".

According to the United States Census Bureau, the CDP has a total area of 13.3 square miles (34.5 km^{2}), of which 13.2 square miles (34.2 km^{2}) is land and 0.077 square miles (0.2 km^{2}), or 0.70%, is water.

== Demographics ==
Historical population
| Census | Pop. | Note | %± |
|---|---|---|---|
| 2000 | 13,380 | | — |
| 2010 | 13,336 | | −0.3% |
| 2020 | 13,271 | | −0.5% |
U.S. Decennial Census

=== 2020 census ===
As of the 2020 census, Ridge had a population of 13,271. The median age was 53.2 years. 15.6% of residents were under the age of 18 and 32.7% of residents were 65 years of age or older. For every 100 females there were 84.7 males, and for every 100 females age 18 and over there were 81.1 males age 18 and over.

96.1% of residents lived in urban areas, while 3.9% lived in rural areas.

There were 5,877 households in Ridge, of which 20.3% had children under the age of 18 living in them. Of all households, 46.6% were married-couple households, 14.2% were households with a male householder and no spouse or partner present, and 34.3% were households with a female householder and no spouse or partner present. About 35.0% of all households were made up of individuals and 25.9% had someone living alone who was 65 years of age or older.

There were 6,336 housing units, of which 7.2% were vacant. The homeowner vacancy rate was 1.8% and the rental vacancy rate was 6.6%.

Racial composition as of the 2020 census
| Race | Number | Percent |
|---|---|---|
| White | 10,956 | 82.6% |
| Black or African American | 772 | 5.8% |
| American Indian and Alaska Native | 16 | 0.1% |
| Asian | 333 | 2.5% |
| Native Hawaiian and Other Pacific Islander | 2 | 0.0% |
| Some other race | 285 | 2.1% |
| Two or more races | 907 | 6.8% |
| Hispanic or Latino (of any race) | 1,145 | 8.6% |

=== 2000 census ===
As of the census of 2000, there were 13,380 people, 5,545 households, and 3,476 families residing in the CDP. The population density was 993.6 inhabitants per square mile (383.6/km^{2}). There were 5,922 housing units at an average density of 439.8 per square mile (169.8/km^{2}). The racial makeup of the CDP was 92.99% White, 3.45% African American, 0.28% Native American, 0.90% Asian, 0.03% Pacific Islander, 0.75% from other races, and 1.59% from two or more races. Hispanic or Latino of any race were 3.51% of the population.

There were 5,545 households, out of which 27.4% had children under the age of 18 living with them, 52.9% were married couples living together, 7.5% had a female householder with no husband present, and 37.3% were non-families. 34.4% of all households were made up of individuals, and 28.5% had someone living alone who was 65 years of age or older. The average household size was 2.38 and the average family size was 3.09.

In the CDP, the population was spread out, with 23.2% under the age of 18, 5.4% from 18 to 24, 24.5% from 25 to 44, 17.8% from 45 to 64, and 29.1% who were 65 years of age or older. The median age was 43 years. For every 100 females, there were 82.9 males. For every 100 females age 18 and over, there were 76.9 males.

The median income for a household in the CDP was $44,140, and the median income for a family was $60,039. Males had a median income of $49,539 versus $31,384 for females. The per capita income for the CDP was $23,387. About 4.4% of families and 6.5% of the population were below the poverty threshold, including 7.5% of those under age 18 and 6.0% of those age 65 or over.

== Education ==
Ridge is served by the Longwood Central School District, which at 58 square miles (150 km^{2}) is the largest school district on Long Island.

== Media ==
- Radio stations W293BT and WLIX-LP are licensed to serve Ridge.
- Transmitter facilities for WCBS-TV's translator station, and WLNY-TV are located in Ridge.
