= Suffolk County Community College =

Public college in Selden, New York, US

- Seal of Suffolk County Community College
- Motto: Vision, Excellence, Wisdom
- Type: Public community college
- Established: 1959; 67 years ago
- Parent institution: State University of New York
- President: Edward Bonahue
- Undergraduates: 21,377 (fall 2025)
- Location: Selden, New York, New York, United States; 40.8484°N 73.0562°W
- Campus: Suburban 555 acres (2.25 km^{2})
- Colors: Royal Blue and White
- Nickname: Sharks
- Sporting affiliations: NJCAA - Division III - Region XV
- Mascots: Fineas, also known as Finn
- Website: www.sunysuffolk.edu

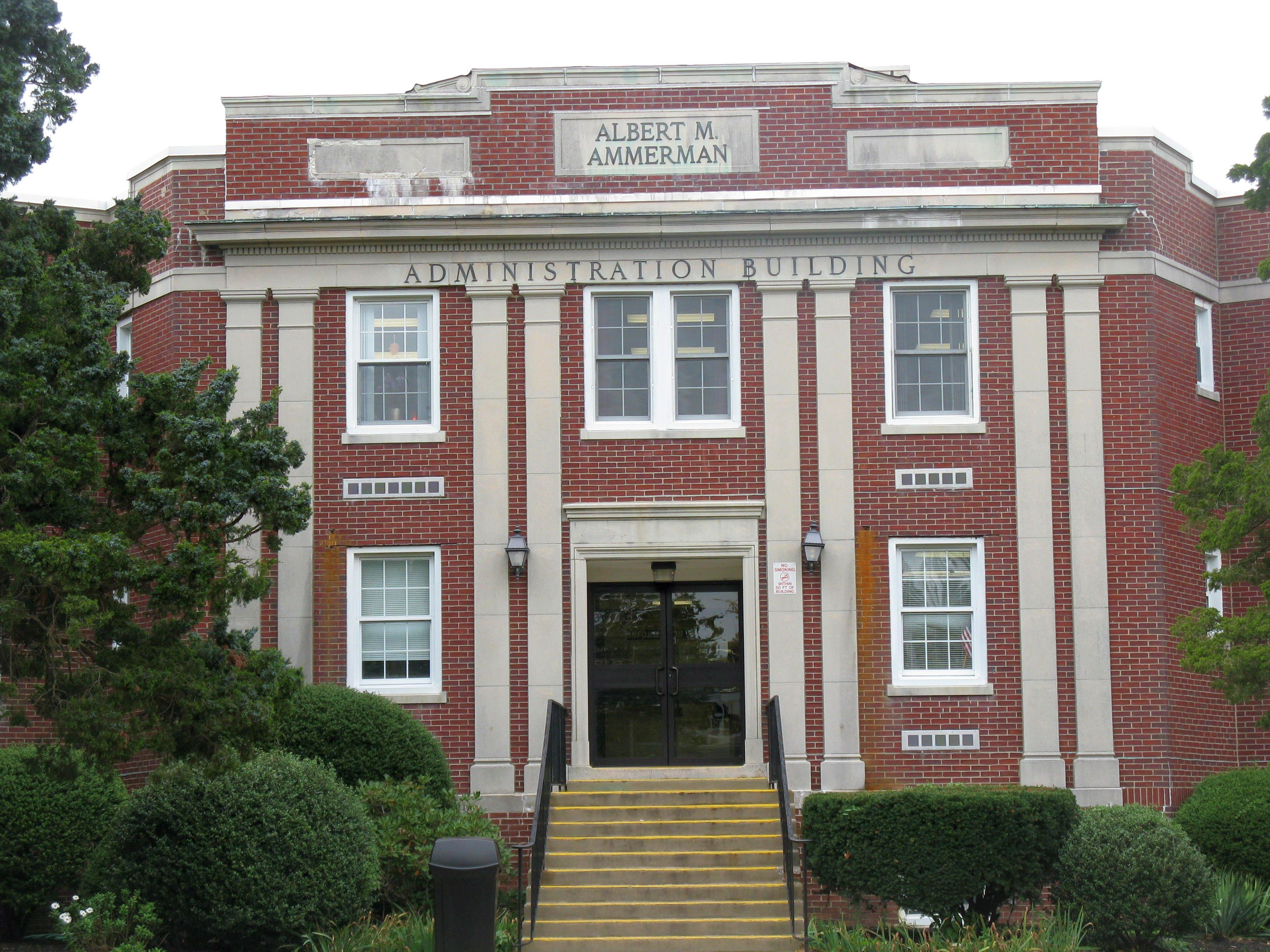
Ammerman Building

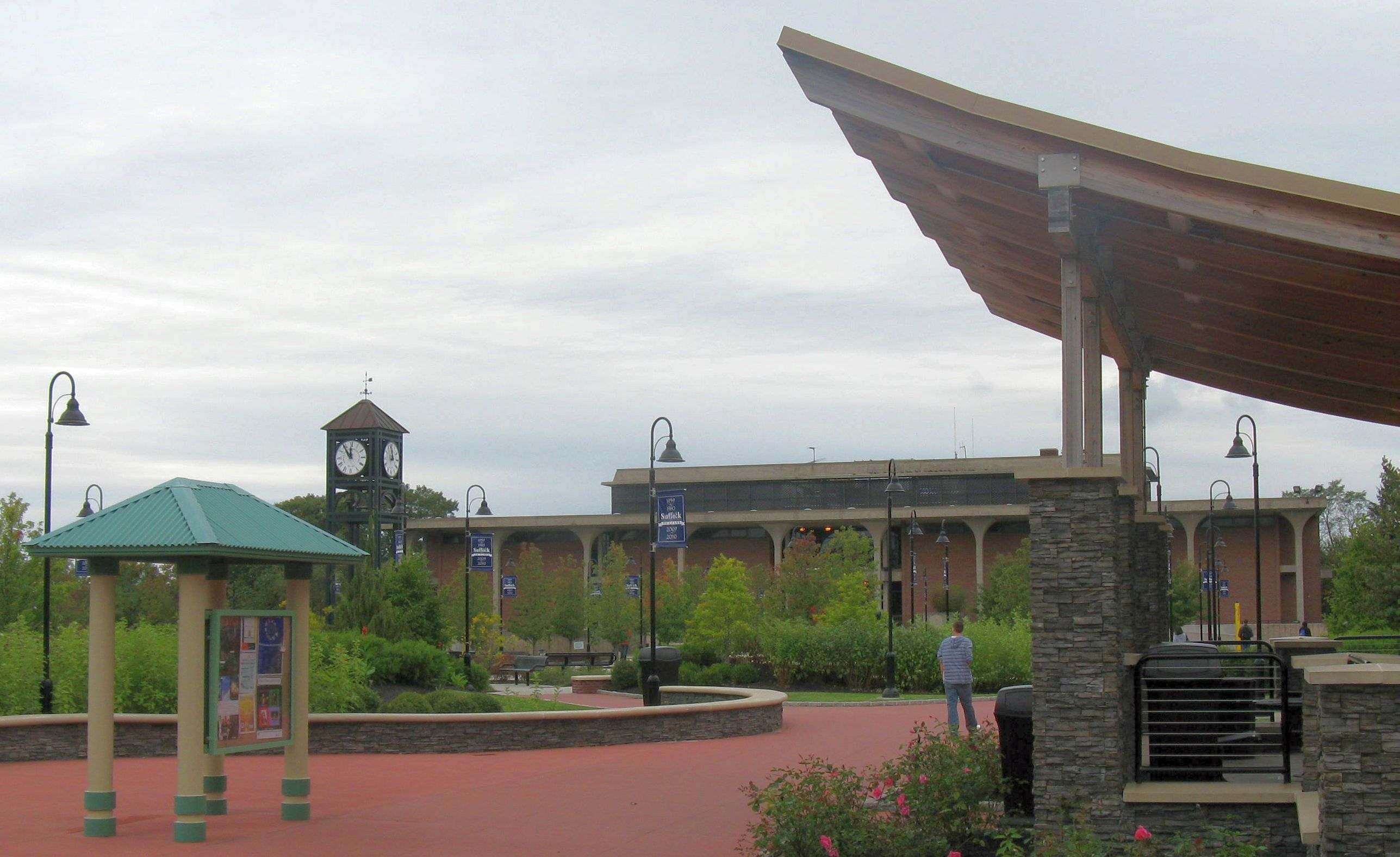
Ammerman campus with Huntington Library in background

Suffolk County Community College (SCCC) is a public community college in Selden, New York. It is part of the State University of New York (SUNY) system and is funded in part by Suffolk County, New York. Suffolk County Community College was founded in 1959 and has three campuses: Selden, Brentwood and Riverhead. It also has a satellite center in downtown Riverhead.

The school was founded largely through the efforts of Albert Ammerman who was the college's president from its founding in December 1959 until 1983. In its first year it had 13 faculty with 171 full-time students at the Sachem High School in Ronkonkoma and 335 part-time students at Riverhead High School until what is now called the Ammerman campus opened in 1962 in the former Suffolk County Tuberculosis Sanatorium (originally built in 1912). By 1977 it had opened a campus in Riverhead and one on the edge of the Pilgrim Psychiatric Center in Brentwood.

== Academics ==
The college offers the Associate in Arts (A.A.), Associate in Science (A.S.), and Associate in Applied Science (A.A.S.) degree, as well as a variety of certificate programs. Many students transfer to four-year colleges and universities to complete their baccalaureate degree after attending SCCC. Suffolk is now also partnered with Cornell University through the Pathways to Success Program which allows transfers directly into Cornell degree programs. Suffolk is also partnered with Stony Brook University and typically allows students with a 3.0 GPA and 24 credit hours to transfer.

== Campuses ==
=== Ammerman Campus ===
The Ammerman campus at Selden opened in 1961. It is the largest, first, and main campus of Suffolk County Community College. Located off of Nicolls Road, it has become a landmark of Suffolk County. The main campus is the home to the majority of the sports teams as well. The site was previously a tuberculosis sanitarium.

Only two of the sanitorium's buildings remain (both of which were built by the Works Progress Administration in the 1930s)—Ammerman Building (the former William Hugh Ross Building for male patients) and Kreiling Hall (the former J.H. Marshall Building for children). School officials deny a persistent rumor that the basement of the Kreiling Hall was used as a morgue noting that the walk-in refrigerators there were used for a cafeteria. As of 2008 only three of the 10,000 Norway spruce and Scotch pine trees that landscaped the sanitarium's grounds remain.

=== Eastern Campus ===
The Eastern campus at Riverhead (actually in the hamlet of Northampton in the Town of Southampton with a Riverhead postal address) opened in 1977 on Speonk-Riverhead Road (CR 88), next to Riverhead-Moriches Road (CR 51). The Eastern campus is the college's smallest. The Eastern campus has hiking trails that are utilized by some athletic courses.

=== Michael J. Grant Campus (Formerly West Campus) ===
The Michael J. Grant campus (formerly West Campus) at Brentwood opened its doors in 1974 on the land once owned by Pilgrim Psychiatric Center and is the college's fastest growing campus. Bordered by Wicks Road, Community College Drive, and Crooked Hill Road (CR 13), the Grant campus is the sole home of the lacrosse, men's & women's track & field, men's & women's bowling, Basketball, and men's & women's indoor track teams.

=== Downtown Sayville ===
The Sayville Downtown Center opened in 2006 and closed in 2023.

=== Downtown Riverhead ===
This satellite center is home to The Culinary Arts and Hospitality Center. It opened in 2008. The campus features a cafe that serves breakfast and lunch.

== Athletics ==
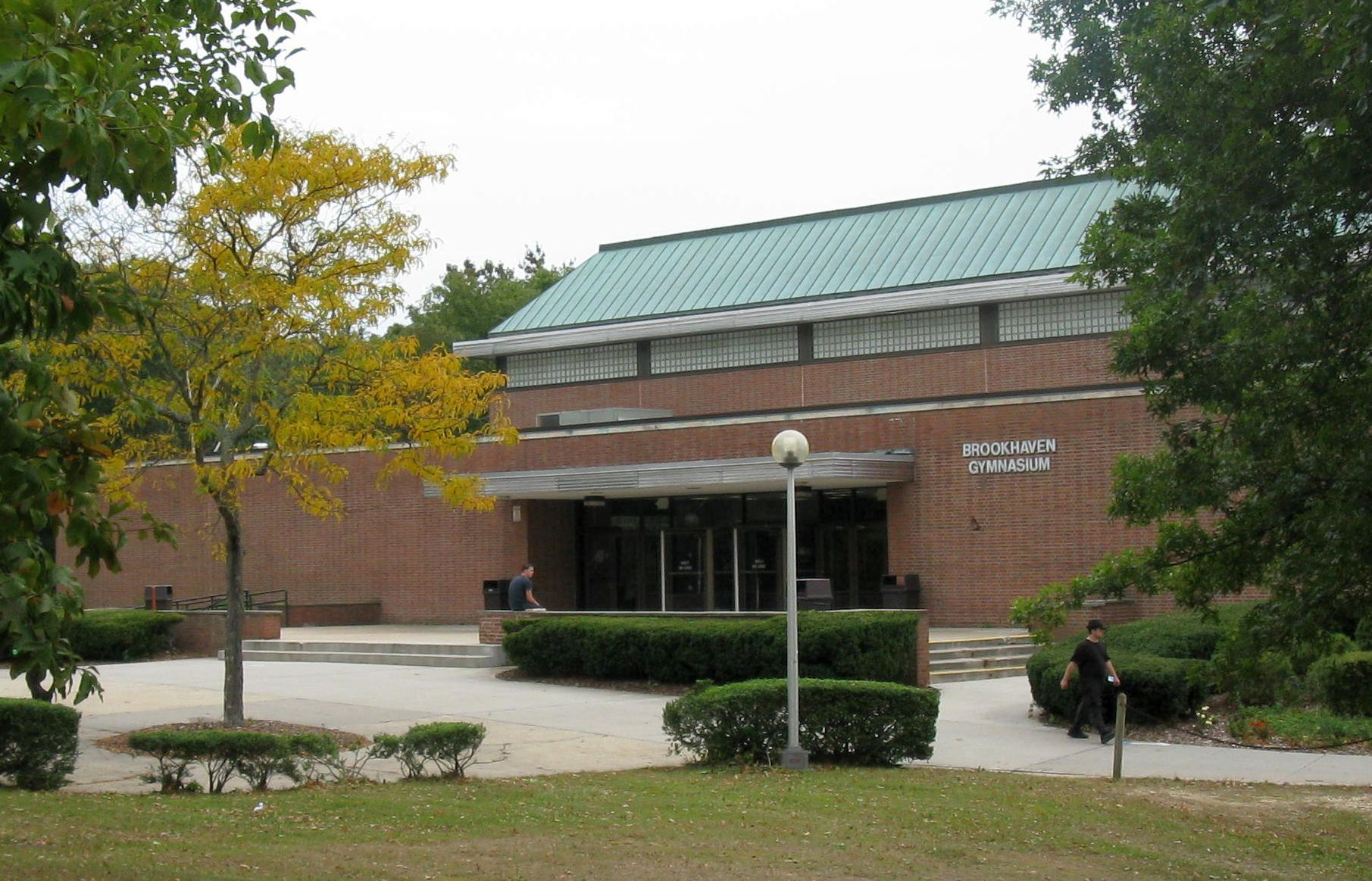
Brookhaven Gymnasium, home of three national championship teams since 2003

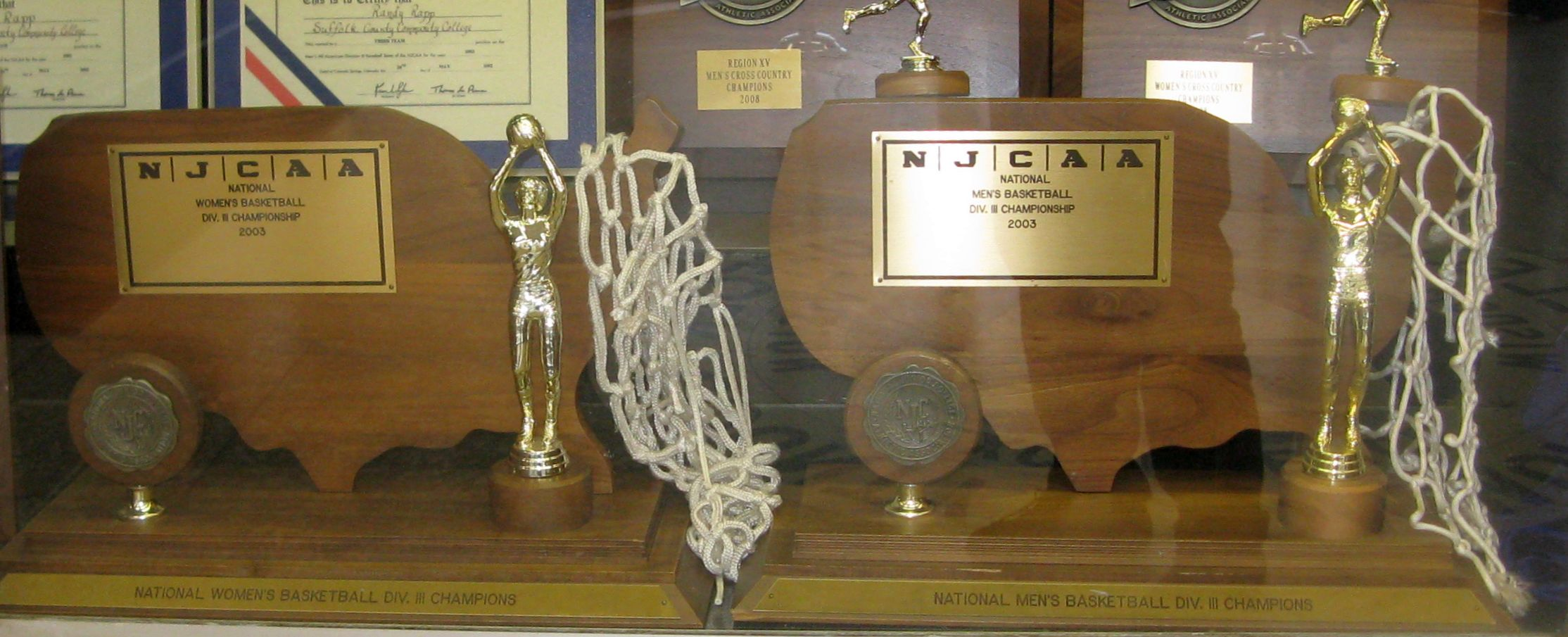
2003 men and women national championship trophy

The college's athletics program is a component of the college's co-curricular offerings. SCCC is a member of the National Junior College Athletic Association. Athletics take place on both the Ammerman and Grant campuses. Men's Intercollegiate sports teams include baseball, basketball, cross-country, golf, lacrosse, soccer, swimming, and tennis. Women's teams include soccer, basketball, cheerleading (co-ed), dance (co-ed), cross-country, swimming, softball, tennis, and volleyball. In addition, the office coordinates an intramural program for men and women.

In the 2003 the men's basketball team won the NJCAA Men's Division III Basketball Championship and the women's basketball team won the NJCAA Women's Basketball Division III Championship. The men repeated as champs in 2004.

In 2005 the women's soccer team was formed, where they placed first during the regular season in division III, region 15. Five members of the team made all region first team players- Angela F. Merante, DiAnna G. Dezego, Jaclyn A. Ciamillo, Jacqueline Papile, and Vanessa Thompson. Komi Afeto, their coach, was named coach of the year.

== Art galleries ==
Suffolk County Community College has student exhibition galleries on each of its three main campuses. The gallery on the Ammerman Campus is the Maurice N. Flecker Memorial Gallery, located in the Southampton Building. The Lyceum Gallery, on the Eastern Campus features local and regional artists as well as student works. Gallery West, is located on The Michael J.Grant Campus and features an annual regional high school exhibition as well as student work.

== Honor societies ==
SCCC has two honor societies, Phi Theta Kappa (ΦΘΚ) and Alpha Beta Gamma (ΑΒΓ).

=== Phi Theta Kappa (ΦΘΚ) ===
PTK membership is based primarily upon academic achievement. Local Chapters:

- Ammerman Campus-Alpha Zeta Nu (ΑΖΝ)
- Eastern Campus-Alpha Eta Psi (ΑΗΨ)
- Michael J. Grant Campus-Alpha Delta Gamma (ΑΔΓ)

=== Alpha Beta Gamma (ΑΒΓ) ===
ABG is an international business honor society established in 1970 to recognize and encourage scholarship among two-year college students in business curricula.

Local Chapters:

- Ammerman Campus-Chi (Χ)
- Eastern Campus-Beta Alpha (ΒΑ)
- Grant Campus-Mu (Μ)

== Notable people ==
=== Faculty ===
- Maury Dean, Rock N' Roll Hall of Fame author
- Mildred Armstrong Kalish, memoirist
- Thomas Woods, historian

=== Alumni ===
- John Bolaris, television meteorologist and realtor
- Danny Burawa, major league baseball pitcher
- Joe DeStefano, member of the New York State Assembly
- Patricia Eddington, former member of the New York State Assembly
- Robert L. Gibson, former NASA astronaut
- Sal Governale, writer for The Howard Stern Show (attended for one year)
- Alan Hahn, NBA analyst for ESPN and MSG Network and sports talk radio host for ESPN Radio
- Tom Postilio, real estate broker and television personality
- Cletus Seldin, champion boxer

== See also ==
- Long Island Shakespeare Festival
