= Joe DeStefano =

American politician (born 1960)

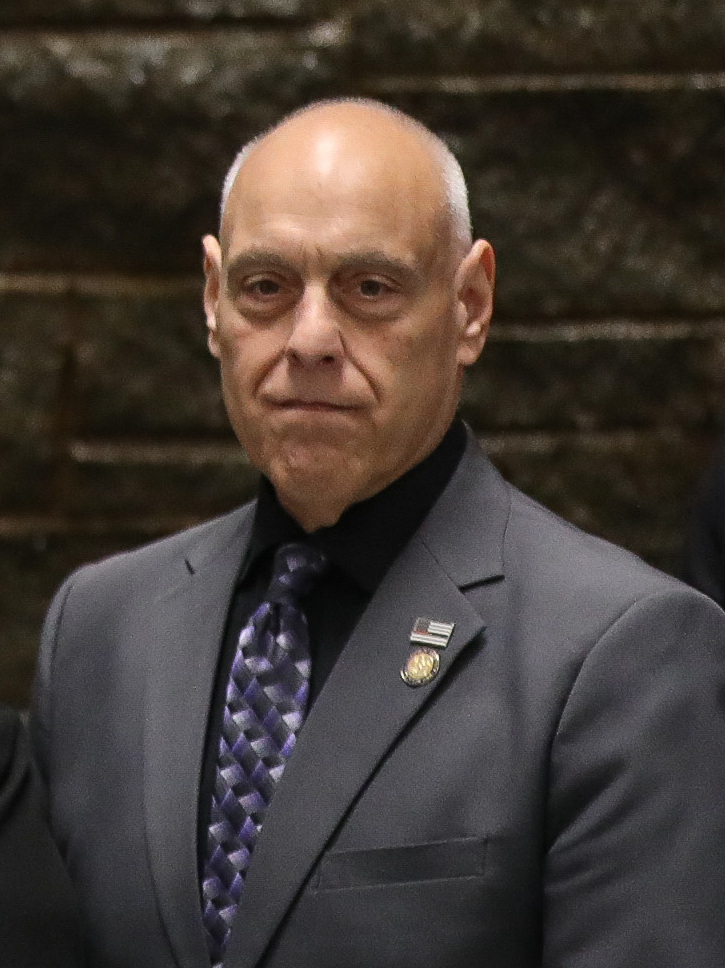
- DeStefano in 2024

Member of the New York State Assembly from the 3rd district
- Incumbent
- Assumed office January 9, 2019
- Preceded by: L. Dean Murray
- Succeeded by: Joshua Slaughter (elect)

Personal details
- Born: June 7, 1960 (age 66)
- Party: Republican
- Education: Suffolk Community College (AS)
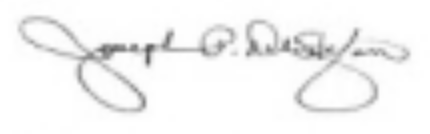
- Signature

Joseph P. DeStefano is a member of the New York State Assembly, representing the 3rd district since 2019. The district includes portions of the town of Brookhaven, including Bellport and Mastic Beach in Suffolk County on Long Island. DeStefano is a Republican.

Since 1980, he has served as an active member of the Medford Fire Department, and in 1996, DeStefano was first elected commissioner of the Medford Fire District. Prior to elected office, DeStefano served as a Suffolk County Sheriff's Office public safety communication supervisor. He is married with two children and one grandchild.

In 2018, Assembly member L. Dean Murray decided to run for the state Senate, where Thomas Croci was retiring. As a result, DeStefano announced his intentions to run for Murray's Assembly seat.

DeStefano defeated his Democratic opponent, Clyde Parker, 54% to 46%.

DeStefano currently sits on the Committee on Aging, Committee on Governmental Employees, Committee on Labor, Committee on Transportation, Committee on Correction, and the Committee on Ways and Means.

New York State Assembly
| Preceded by L. Dean Murray | Member of the New York Assembly from the 3rd District; 2019–present | Incumbent |
