= WLIX-LP =

Radio station in Ridge, New York

- Ridge, New York; United States
- Broadcast area: Brookhaven, New York
- Frequency: 94.7 MHz

Programming
- Language: Spanish
- Format: Christian radio

Ownership
- Owner: RCN Ministry Inc.

History
- First air date: August 17, 2005
- Call sign meaning: Long Island Radio X (former branding)

Technical information
- Licensing authority: FCC
- Facility ID: 131740
- Class: L1
- ERP: 21 watts
- HAAT: 64.1 meters (210 ft)
- Transmitter coordinates: 40°53′50″N 72°54′56″W

Links
- Public license information: LMS
- Webcast: Listen live
- Website: radiocanticonuevo.com

WLIX-LP (94.7 FM) is a low power radio station broadcasting a Spanish language Christian radio format, licensed to Ridge, New York. The station is currently owned by RCN Ministry Inc.

== History ==
The radio station went on the air August 17, 2005 as RadioX, a modern/alternative rock radio station. The Federal Communications Commission issued a construction permit for the station on February 27, 2004. The station was assigned the WLIX-LP call sign on March 10, 2004, and received its license to cover on September 30, 2005. The radio station had approximately 60,000 listeners at its peak, but suffered financial difficulties. A programming agreement was established with a local ministry in April 2007. This converted WLIX-LP to a Christian Radio format.

This arrangement continued until Labor Day weekend of 2012. On August 31, 94.7 WLIX switched programming to adult standards, using "The Penthouse" format from Big Sticks Broadcasting and serving as the flagship station for this format. On November 1, 2012, the adult standards programming ceased, and WLIX switched to a classic soft adult contemporary format.

WLIX-LP went silent at noon on December 31, 2017. It resumed operations on July 3, 2018, with a new 80s Classic Hits format, quickly followed by a flip to Spanish.

Licensee Pine Barrens Broadcasting donated the station's license to RCN Ministry Inc. effective October 6, 2020.
