= Longwood Central School District =

School district in the U.S. state of New York

Location
- Town of Brookhaven, Suffolk County, New York United States
- Coordinates: 40°52′42″N 72°56′25″W

District information
- Type: Public
- Motto: Every one ... every day
- Grades: PK-12
- Established: 1959
- President: Victoria Molloy
- Superintendent: Lance Lohman, Ed.D
- Schools: 7

Students and staff
- Students: 8,788
- District mascot: Lions
- Colors: Green, White, Gold

Other information
- District Offices: 35 Yaphank Middle Island Road Middle Island, NY 11953
- Website: www.longwood.k12.ny.us

Longwood Central School District covers 53 square miles (140 km^{2}) in central Brookhaven Town, Suffolk County, New York, United States. It serves the entirety of the hamlets of Middle Island and Gordon Heights and parts of Ridge, Rocky Point, East Shoreham, Shirley, Miller Place, Medford, Coram, Yaphank, and Upton (Brookhaven National Laboratory). During the 2017–2018 school year, there were 15,833 students enrolled and 2,069 teachers employed at Longwood CSD.

== History ==
=== Early districts ===
In 1813, Brookhaven Town laid out the boundaries of all the school districts in the town. This created the school districts of the town, including the ones that would one day merge to become Longwood.

==== Coram ====
District #10 was Coram, which was defined at the time as serving Coram residents as far west as the property of James Norton. Coram became District #14 in 1842. Coinciding with the district's creation, a one room schoolhouse was built in 1813. This school served Coram until 1900 when it was replaced by a new school. The original Coram one room schoolhouse is still standing today. The district grew towards the merger that would end it in its original form in 1959, as a much larger school was built in 1951 to replace the one in 1900. This school served students up to 6th grade. Secondary students in the district went to schools in the district of Port Jefferson.

==== Ridge ====
Ridge was District #22, and when it was created it was stated to be in between Middle Island and Wading River. The district also, much like the modern district formed from a merger of districts such as Ridge, includes Lake Panamoka and Northern Shirley. The district used a school built the same year as the district in 1813. The district gained a second school in 1872, which was also used for religious services in conjunction with a Middle Island Presbyterian Church.

==== East Middle Island ====
East Middle Island's district became District #17 of Brookhaven Town in 1835, after originally being District #12. The original boundaries of #17 are more similar to the modern William Floyd School District or South Country Central School District, including Mastic and the Brookhaven (CDP). The number change in 1835 occurred because of a split, creating the East Middle Island and Yaphank districts from the original District #12. This district of East Middle Island used a one room schoolhouse from 1835 until 1928, when a two room school opened directly across from the original one. The original one room schoolhouse is still standing today, but has since been relocated by the modern district.

==== West Middle Island ====
West Middle Island was originally District #11 of Brookhaven Town when district borders and numbers were originally assigned in 1813, but later became District #16 in 1842. The original one room schoolhouse that opened with the district lasted all the way until 1914, when it was replaced by a more modern school. This school burned down a few years later.

==== West Yaphank ====
The area of West Yaphank was known for many years as Coram Hills. When the 1813 district division occurred, District #23 served Coram Hills as far east as what is today the Mott House in eastern Coram. In 1852, the West Yaphank district had just 15 students attending school in the district. A school was built in the West Yaphank district in 1907, due to the original school being burned down in a fire. The school built in 1907 was later demolished.

==== Yaphank ====
The Yaphank district was born from the division of the original District #12 in 1835 into two, Yaphank and East Middle Island. The district utilized a red, boxy, eight-sided school located in the very most northern part of Yaphank until 1856, when it was replaced by a more modern school for the time in Central Yaphank. The construction on said building began in 1854. This school would serve the district for over 70 years until 1926, when another school opened on the same property. The Yaphank Fire Department purchased and relocated the school closed in 1926.

=== Centralization ===
Longwood Central School District was formed from a merger of the Coram, Yaphank, West Yaphank, East Middle Island, West Middle Island, and Ridge school districts in 1959. It was originally called the "Middle Island Central School District" before the Longwood name was adopted in the 1980s. The district became District #12, taking the number of the former East Middle Island and Yaphank districts.

== Schools ==
There are four primary schools in Longwood CSD, each serving grades 2, 3, and 4 in the main building and kindergarten through first in an annex:

- Ridge Elementary School
- Charles E. Walters Elementary School in Yaphank
- West Middle Island Elementary School in Middle Island
- Coram Elementary School

There are three secondary schools in Longwood CSD:

- Longwood Middle School (approx. 2,000 students), part of the "open school project" in the 1970s, serves grades 5-6.
- Longwood Junior High School (approx. 2,000 students) serves grades 7-8.
- Longwood High School (approx. 3,000 students) serves grades 9-12.

The land on which the High School (now the JHS) was built was donated by Elbert Smith from the Longwood Estate.

=== Renovations ===
During the 1999–2000 school year, fences went up surrounding each school property. Construction adding four new wings in the high school, two new wings in the junior high school, one new "house" in the middle school, and complete renovation of the primary buildings and various additions to the intermediate buildings of the elementary schools was underway. The new wings of the high, junior high, and middle schools and the intermediate buildings of the elementary schools were complete and ready for the 2000–2001 school year. During the 2000–2001 school year, construction crews demolished all but one hallway in each primary building of the elementary schools. Major additions were completed while school was in session. The hallways that were left ended up being gutted during the summer of 2001, and they were fully restored for the 2001–2002 school year.

=== Grade shifting ===
For the 2001–2002 school year, when most of the renovations were complete, the grades housed in each school building changed. The elementary schools went from housing grades K-5 to housing grades K-4; the middle school from grades 6-7 to grades 5-6; the junior high school from grades 8-9 to grades 7-8; and the high school from grades 10-12 to grades 9-12. Because of this change, from 2000 until 2005, the first day of classes was different for every grade. Grades K-2, 5, 7, 9, and 10 began classes on one day, while grades 3-4, 6, 8, and 11-12 began classes the following day. Both sets of grades then attended classes on the third day and would continue to follow normal schedules from that point on.

=== The Bond Proposal ===
In April 2024, it was announced that the Longwood District would be upgrading and maintaining the school facilities. On May 21, 2024, it was voted on, but before that, they already got to work by upgrading the Middle School and the High School. During this time, it is noted that over the cores of the 2024-2025 school years and 2025-2026 school years, it would still be worked on. This would not be possible without the help of some money for the United States and the state of New York.

== Academics ==
According to 2007 data, 82% of Longwood graduates earn a New York State Regent's diploma. 44.9 percent of graduates plan to attend 4 year college, and 40.7% plan to attend a 2-year college. In 2005, 86% of the class went on to college, with 8% going on to serve in the military or directly into the workforce, and 78% earned a Regents Diploma.

== Athletics ==
Longwood schools feature football, cheerleading, track, baseball, wrestling, basketball, volleyball, softball, soccer, tennis, lacrosse, cross country and many other athletic opportunities.

=== Team Achievements ===
Girls Soccer won League Titles in 1995 and 2024.

Girls Bowling won Suffolk County in 1989, 2022, and 2023.

Boys Bowling won Suffolk County in 2023.

Baseball won Long Island and Suffolk County in 1998 and 2001, and also won State in 1998.

=== Longwood Football ===
==== Championships ====
Lions Varsity football won the Suffolk County Championship in 1993, 1998, 2004, and 2015, winning the Long Island Championship in all but 1993. They played Massapequa in 1993 and 1998 and played Farmingdale in 2004 and 2015. The 1998 team also ended Patchogue-Medford's Suffolk County record-tying 22 game win streak that year, defeating the Raiders 19-0 at homecoming. Pat-Med were also coming off back to back Division I Long Island Championships.

==== 2014 and 2015 ====
On October 11, 2014, the Longwood High School Varsity Football Team was ranked the #1 team on Long Island after making their 5th win with no losses for the homecoming game. They went on to win Suffolk Division I as undefeated 8-0 champions before losing to Patchogue-Medford High School in the second round of the playoffs with a 9-1 record. The next season, the 2015 season, the Football Team came back much stronger to become Class I Long Island Champions with an 11-1 record. The only loss that season was to Lindenhurst during Week 5, which they crushed 44-14 in the Class I Suffolk County Championships.

==== Parkway Power Bowl ====
Longwood High School football plays an annual game versus William Floyd known as the "Parkway Power Bowl." Both teams are two of the best in Division I of Suffolk County football and are connected by the William Floyd Parkway, hence the series name. There have been 14 games in the series so far, with Floyd having won the last 10 straight and leading the all time series 12-2. The score of each game is engraved onto the series trophy, along with the winning team.

== Notable alumni ==
- Biz Markie (1964–2021), American rapper, singer, DJ, record producer, actor, comedian, and writer
- Jamel Herring (born 1985), Olympian and professional boxer
- Kerry McCoy (born 1974), United States Olympian wrestler
- Bryant Neal Vinas (born 1982), convicted Al Qaeda supporter
- Tony Nese (born 1985), professional wrestler
- Odyssey Jones (born 1994), professional wrestler
- Cletus Seldin (born 1986), Professional Boxer
- Tika Sumpter (born 1980), actress
- Phallon Tullis-Joyce (born 1996), professional soccer player
