= Southaven County Park =

Park in New York State

Coordinates: 40°49′09″N 72°53′54″W

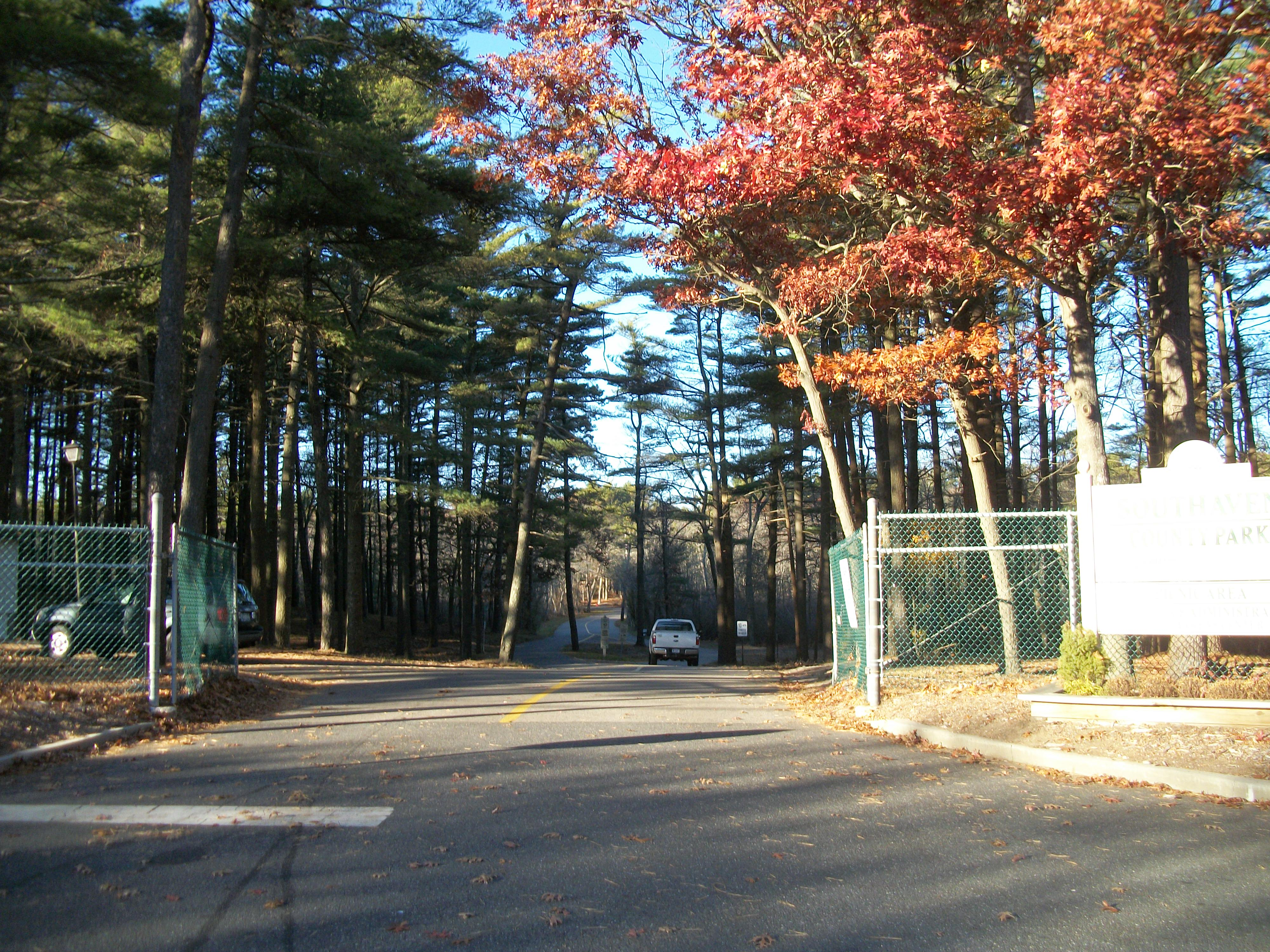
The entrance to Southaven County Park on Victory Avenue. Taken in November 2013.

Southaven County Park is located in South Haven and Yaphank, New York in central Long Island. It is located between Sunrise Highway (Route 27) just west of William Floyd Parkway, off of Victory Avenue (Suffolk CR 56/North Sunrise Service Road), and crossed by the Carmans River.

In the 1960s, it became one of Suffolk County’s first parks opened to the public. The territory of the parkland reaches as far north as East Main Street and Yaphank Avenue in Yaphank, which contains the historic Homan-Gerard House and Mills as well as the Mary Louise Booth Girlhood Home. Segments of the Long Island Expressway and the Main Line of the Long Island Rail Road runs through the park, though it is accessible from neither the LIE nor the railroad. The park has become famous for being the crash site of an alleged UFO in 1992. The park is also home to a population of non-native sika deer.
