= Gordon Heights, New York =

- Hamlet and census-designated place
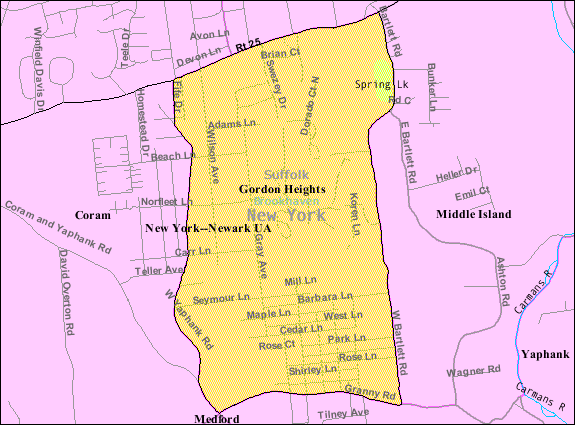
- U.S. Census map of Gordon Heights.

- Location within the state of New York
- Coordinates: 40°51′27″N 72°57′59″W
- Country: United States
- State: New York
- County: Suffolk
- Town: Brookhaven

Area
  - Total: 1.72 sq mi (4.45 km^{2})
  - Land: 1.70 sq mi (4.41 km^{2})
  - Water: 0.015 sq mi (0.04 km^{2})
- Elevation: 154 ft (47 m)

Population (2020)
  - Total: 3,981
  - Density: 2,336.1/sq mi (901.96/km^{2})
- Time zone: UTC−05:00 (Eastern Time Zone)
  - Summer (DST): UTC−04:00
- ZIP Code: 11763
- Area codes: 631, 934
- FIPS code: 36-29509
- GNIS feature ID: 0970171

Gordon Heights is a hamlet and census-designated place (CDP) in the Town of Brookhaven, Suffolk County, Long Island, New York, United States. The population was 3,981 at the 2020 census.

== History ==
Gordon Heights had its beginnings in the early 1920s, when developer Louis Fife went to Black neighborhoods in New York City (Harlem, Brooklyn, and The Bronx) with the offer of land and a better life on Long Island. Land was offered as low as $10 down and $10 monthly or $10 weekly.

Promoted as a place that would be a solid, close-knit community of small farms, the pilgrimage to Long Island began in 1927. Gordon Heights was named after "Pop" Gordon, a man who had previously owned most of the land that became part of the new community.

A civic association was formed to address the need of area residents. It would later become known as the Gordon Heights Progressive Association, which was founded in 1945. This group was the parent body of the Gordon Heights Fire Department.

== Geography ==
According to the United States Census Bureau, the CDP has a total area of 1.7 square miles (4.5 km^{2}), of which 0.015 square miles (0.04 km^{2}), or 0.80%, is water.

== Demographics ==
Historical population
Census	Pop.	Note	%±
2000	3,094		—
2010	4,042		30.6%
2020	3,981		−1.5%
U.S. Decennial Census; 2010 2020

=== Racial and ethnic composition ===
Gordon Heights CDP, New York – Racial and ethnic composition Note: the US Census treats Hispanic/Latino as an ethnic category. This table excludes Latinos from the racial categories and assigns them to a separate category. Hispanics/Latinos may be of any race.
Race / Ethnicity (NH = Non-Hispanic)	Pop 2000	Pop 2010	Pop 2020	% 2000	% 2010	% 2020
White alone (NH)	599	783	649	19.36%	19.37%	16.30%
Black or African American alone (NH)	1,846	1,971	1,478	59.66%	48.76%	37.13%
Native American or Alaska Native alone (NH)	25	62	55	0.81%	1.53%	1.38%
Asian alone (NH)	59	75	91	1.91%	1.86%	2.29%
Native Hawaiian or Pacific Islander alone (NH)	1	3	0	0.03%	0.07%	0.00%
Other race alone (NH)	11	10	46	0.36%	0.25%	1.16%
Mixed race or Multiracial (NH)	104	126	183	3.36%	3.12%	4.60%
Hispanic or Latino (any race)	449	1,012	1,479	14.51%	25.04%	37.15%
Total	3,094	4,042	3,981	100.00%	100.00%	100.00%

=== 2020 census ===
As of the 2020 census, Gordon Heights had a population of 3,981. The median age was 34.4 years. 26.4% of residents were under the age of 18 and 10.7% were 65 years of age or older. For every 100 females, there were 99.0 males, and for every 100 females age 18 and over, there were 94.9 males.

100.0% of residents lived in urban areas, while 0.0% lived in rural areas.

There were 1,059 households, of which 44.7% had children under the age of 18 living in them. Of all households, 44.5% were married-couple households, 16.6% were households with a male householder and no spouse or partner present, and 30.9% were households with a female householder and no spouse or partner present. About 15.2% of all households were made up of individuals, and 7.4% had someone living alone who was 65 years of age or older.

There were 1,131 housing units, of which 6.4% were vacant. The homeowner vacancy rate was 1.4% and the rental vacancy rate was 5.5%.

=== 2000 census ===
As of the census of 2000, there were 3,094 people, 856 households, and 678 families residing in the CDP. The population density was 1,827.0 inhabitants per square mile (705.4/km^{2}). There were 945 housing units at an average density of 558.0 per square mile (215.4/km^{2}). The racial makeup of the CDP was 62.12% African American, 24.27% White, 1.36% Native American, 1.91% Asian, 0.03% Pacific Islander, 5.14% from other races, and 5.17% from two or more races. Hispanic or Latino of any race were 14.51% of the population.

There were 856 households, out of which 45.4% had children under the age of 18 living with them, 47.9% were married couples living together, 24.8% had a female householder with no husband present, and 20.7% were non-families. 14.7% of all households were made up of individuals, and 4.6% had someone living alone who was 65 years of age or older. The average household size was 3.53 and the average family size was 3.83.

In the CDP, the population was spread out, with 35.2% under the age of 18, 7.9% from 18 to 24, 29.4% from 25 to 44, 18.7% from 45 to 64, and 8.7% who were 65 years of age or older. The median age was 31 years. For every 100 females, there were 95.1 males. For every 100 females age 18 and over, there were 91.0 males.

The median income for a household in the CDP was $56,250, and the median income for a family was $54,450. Males had a median income of $39,120 versus $31,797 for females. The per capita income for the CDP was $17,516. About 8.9% of families and 10.5% of the population were below the poverty threshold, including 10.7% of those under age 18 and 8.3% of those age 65 or over.

== Education ==
=== School district ===
Gordon Heights is located entirely within the boundaries of (and is thus served by) the Longwood Central School District.

=== Library district ===
Gordon Heights is located within the boundaries of the Longwood Library District.

== Transportation ==
Gordon Heights is served by the 52A and 52B buses, operated by Suffolk County Transit. The routes both run from Gordon Heights to the Central Islip train station, with the 52A serving Coram Plaza and the 52B serving Brookhaven Town Hall. The 52A runs seven days a week, while the 52B only operates on weekdays.
