= Smith Estate (Ridge, New York) =

Historic house in New York, United States

- U.S. National Register of Historic Places
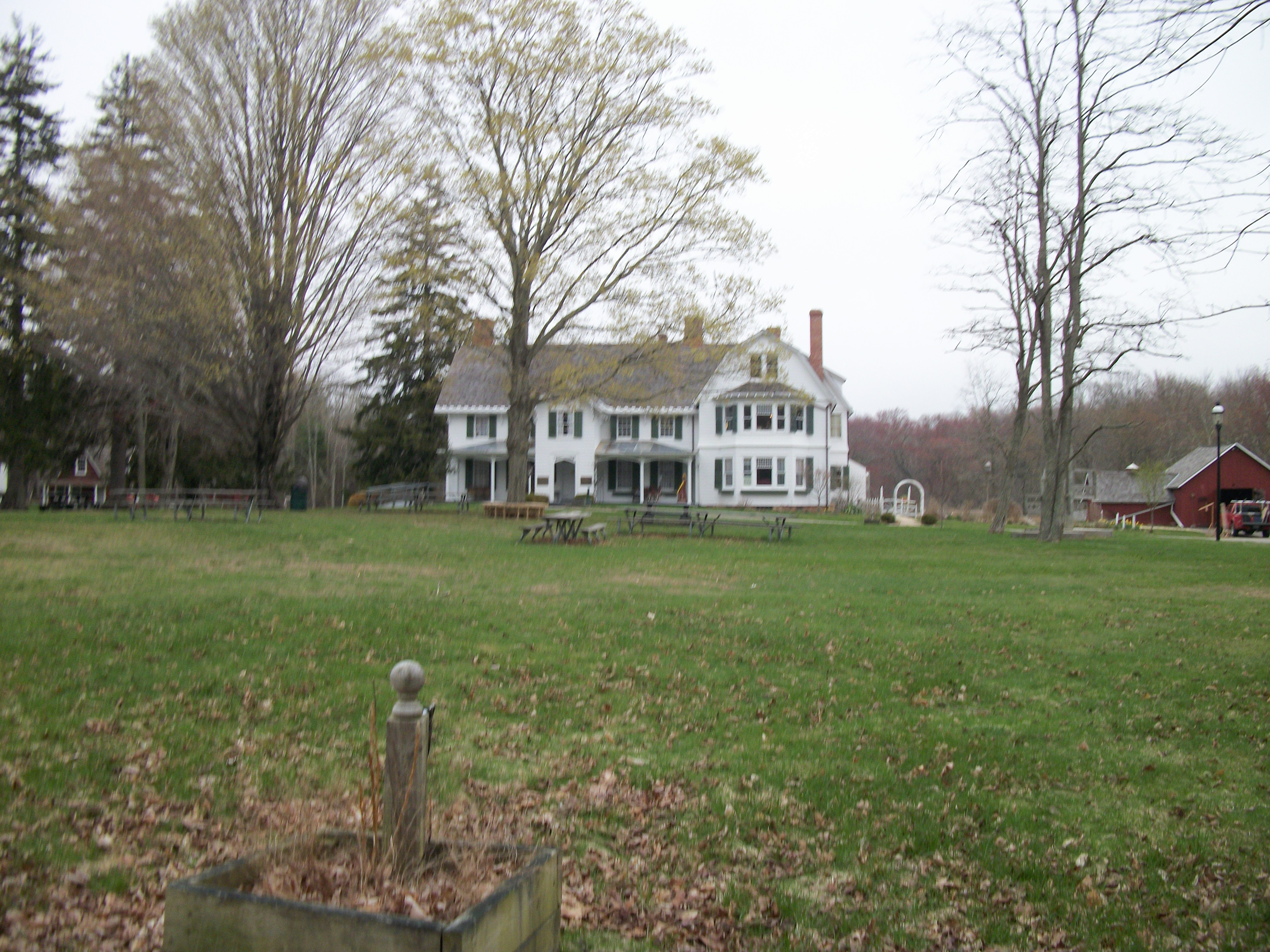
- The Longwood Estate, in Ridge, New York, one of many structures on the Smith Estate property.

- Location within New York Location within the United States
- Nearest city: Ridge, New York
- Coordinates: 40°52′5″N 72°54′24″W
- Area: 35 acres (14 ha)
- Built: 1790
- Architectural style: Colonial Revival, Gothic
- NRHP reference No.: 81000414
- Added to NRHP: December 10, 1981

Smith Estate, also known as Longwood Estate - Smith House, is a historic estate located at Ridge in Suffolk County, New York. It is preserved and maintained by the Town of Brookhaven. The Longwood Estate is part of a huge parcel of land originally purchased by William "Tangier" Smith in the 17th century, which he called Manor St. George. The estate consists of a large, late 18th century main house (altered and enlarged during the 19th century), caretaker's cottage, a farm complex (of barns and sheds dating from the late 18th through early 20th centuries), the Smith family cemetery, and a small frame schoolhouse moved to the property in 1977.

It was added to the National Register of Historic Places in 1981.
