= Broadcasting Institute of Maryland =

Broadcasting school located in Baltimore, Maryland, US

The Broadcasting Institute of Maryland was an American broadcasting school located in Baltimore, Maryland. Operating from 1969 to 2015, it was accredited by the Accrediting Commission of Career Schools and Colleges (ACCSC).
