= William "Tangier" Smith =

English colonial governor

William "Tangier" Smith (February 2, 1655 – February 18, 1705) was a governor of Tangier, on the coast of Morocco, and an early settler of New York who owned more than 50 miles (80 km) of Atlantic Ocean waterfront property in central Long Island in New York State, in what is called the Manor of St. George. In 1701, he was Acting Governor of New York. He also has a school named after him in Mastic Beach, New York named Tangier Smith Elementary School.

== Early life ==
Smith was born on February 2, 1655, in Higham Ferrers, Northamptonshire, in England.

== Career ==
He was sent to join his uncle William Staines in English Tangier and was elected Common Councilman of Tangier in 1677, becoming an alderman there in 1679. He was mayor from 1682 until the English evacuated the colony in October 1683, following attacks by forces under Ismail Ibn Sharif. During Smith's term as mayor, the English demolished the city's fortifications, as part of the evacuation of the Tangier Garrison.

Smith next settled in the City of London, where he had a trading business in Long Acre.

=== Life in America ===
In 1686, Smith and his wife and three of his children sailed from Cork in Ireland to New York at the urging of Thomas Dongan, 2nd Earl of Limerick, who had been Lieutenant-Governor of Tangier during Smith's years there and had now been named Provincial Governor of New York. Smith's daughter Hibernia died during the passage to North America aboard the ship Thomas.

Smith received grants of land from Lord Limerick and supplemented them with large purchases of Native American land. On May 25, 1691, Smith purchased a substantial tract of the land that is now the Town of Brookhaven, New York, from John Mayhew of the Unkechaug Nation. In exchange, the Unkechaugs were given title to 175 acres (0.71 km^{2}), which has now been reduced to the 55-acre (220,000 m^{2}) Poospatuck Reservation — the smallest reservation in New York state.

Smith eventually accumulated more than 81,000 acres (330 km^{2}) stretching from Riverhead, New York, in the north east to the Carmans River at Shirley, New York, in the south west. Additionally, he gained title to all of Fire Island, New York.

The deal cemented when Colonial New York Governor Benjamin Fletcher granted Smith a patent to establish a manor on the land which was to be called the Manor of St. George: a section of land stretching from Riverhead to Mastic, New York. Smith was to oversee the Manor from land he had bought earlier in Setauket, New York, also in the Town of Brookhaven.

He was appointed to the Governor's Council in 1691. That year, he also served as one of the commissioners of oyer and terminer who tried and condemned Jacob Leisler, and he was appointed to the Supreme Court of the province of New York. In 1692 he was made Chief Justice of that court. In 1701 he served for several months as Acting Governor of New York following the death of the governor and the absence of the lieutenant governor.

== Personal life ==
Coat of Arms of William "Tangier" Smith

Smith married the English-born Martha Tunstall in Tangier in 1675. They had thirteen (possibly fourteen) children born to this union which were:

- Elizabeth Smith (1676–1681), born and died in Tangier
- John Smith (1677–1677/8), born and died in Tangier
- Col. Henry Smith (1678/9–1766), born in Tangier and died at Manor of St. George, Setauket, Long Island, New York
- William Smith (I) (1679/80–1680), born and died in Tangier
- Martha "Patty" Smith (1681–1736), born and died in New York or Manor of Scarsdale, Westchester, New York. She married Caleb Heathcote, an English-born mayor of New York City.
- Mary Smith (1682–1684), born in Tangier and died in Long Acre, England
- William Smith Jr. (II) (1683/4–1683/4), born at Long Acre and died in Old Brainford, London
- Hibernia Smith (1686–1686), born at Youghal, County Cork, Ireland and died at sea.
- Jeane (Janey) Smith (1687–after September 7, 1707), born in New York
- Maj. William Henry Smith (1688/9–1742/3), born in Brookhaven, Long Island, New York
- Gloryana Smith (1690–1710), born in Brookhaven and died at Manor of Scarsdale
- Theodocia Smith (1691–1691), born and died in Brookhaven
- Charles Jeffery (Jeffry) Smith (1693–1715), born and died at Manor of St. George
- Gilbert Smith (d. 1742), possibly a child of Smith and Tunstall

After Smith's death, his heirs built a house on Bellport Bay that today is called the "Manor of St. George." A peninsula projecting into Narrow Bay and connecting Bellport with Moriches Bay is called Smith's Point and is the source of the name for Smith Point County Park. The names of "Smith", "Manor" and "Tangier" are used extensively as placenames throughout Brookhaven, including Manorville, New York.

=== Descendants ===
Smith's descendants include: Franklin Delano Roosevelt (1882–1945), through Col. Henry Smith by his wife, Anna Shepard, John Smith (1752–1816), and William Sidney Mount (1807–1868). The descendants of William Tangier Smith continue to frequently use Tangier as part of their name.
