= Middle Island, New York =

- Hamlet and census-designated place
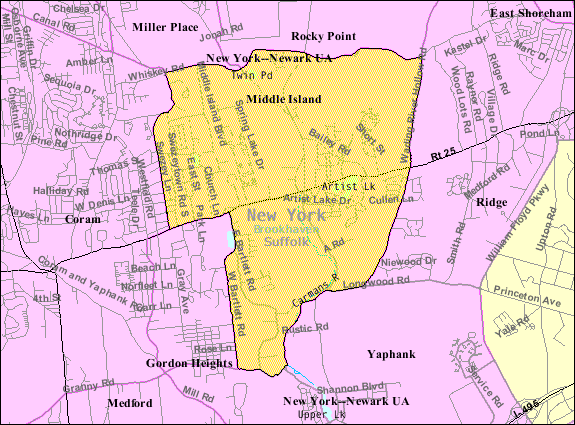
- U.S. Census map

- Location on Long Island Location within the state of New York
- Coordinates: 40°53′6″N 72°56′36″W
- Country: United States
- State: New York
- County: Suffolk
- Town: Brookhaven

Area
  - Total: 8.28 sq mi (21.44 km^{2})
  - Land: 8.22 sq mi (21.29 km^{2})
  - Water: 0.058 sq mi (0.15 km^{2})
- Elevation: 82 ft (25 m)

Population (2020)
  - Total: 10,546
  - Density: 1,283.1/sq mi (495.42/km^{2})
- Time zone: UTC−05:00 (Eastern Time Zone)
  - Summer (DST): UTC−04:00 (EDT)
- ZIP Code: 11953
- Area codes: 631, 934
- FIPS code: 36-46976
- GNIS feature ID: 0957111

Middle Island is a hamlet and census-designated place (CDP) located within the Town of Brookhaven, in Suffolk County, on Long Island, in New York, United States. The population was 10,546 at the time of the 2020 census.

The community is situated between the hamlets of Coram and Ridge to the west and east, respectively – and the hamlets of Rocky Point and Yaphank to the north and south, respectively. The name derives from the fact that it lies approximately halfway between the eastern and western ends of Long Island (Montauk Point and the East River) as well as halfway between the northern and southern boundaries (the Long Island Sound and the Atlantic Ocean).

== History ==
The European-American history of Middle Island goes back at least to 1766, when the first Presbyterian church was built. Rev. David Rose, who was also a doctor and a pastor of the South Haven church, covered his immense parish on horseback. He filled his saddle bags with Bibles and medicines to minister to his frontier congregation. In 1766 the parish opened a cemetery just across from the church.

Around the same time, a veteran of the French and Indian War named Jonathan Edwards who admired the white pine trees of Quebec swiped the seedlings for himself and began planting them along what is today Middle Island-Miller Place Road. Many of these pine trees were spread throughout the community. A local farmer named William Dayton swiped some of the pine cones from the site of the original plantings in 1812 and brought them to his farm south of what is today Middle Country Road, towards an area of Yaphank-Middle Island Road north of Longwood Road. The area near the William Davis farmstead is now part of Prosser Pines and Cathedral Pines County Parks.

The first schoolhouse was built in 1813 east of the church. In 1837, a new church was built just to the rear of the older one. It served the community for 200 years until the new Christian Education building was built at the Longwood Estate in 1966.

For over 100 years (until it was burned down in 1971), Pfeiffer's Store was a center of activity for Middle Island and surrounding communities. A nearby lake, known as Corwin's Pond, was renamed "Artist Lake" after painter Alonzo Chappel settled there in 1869.

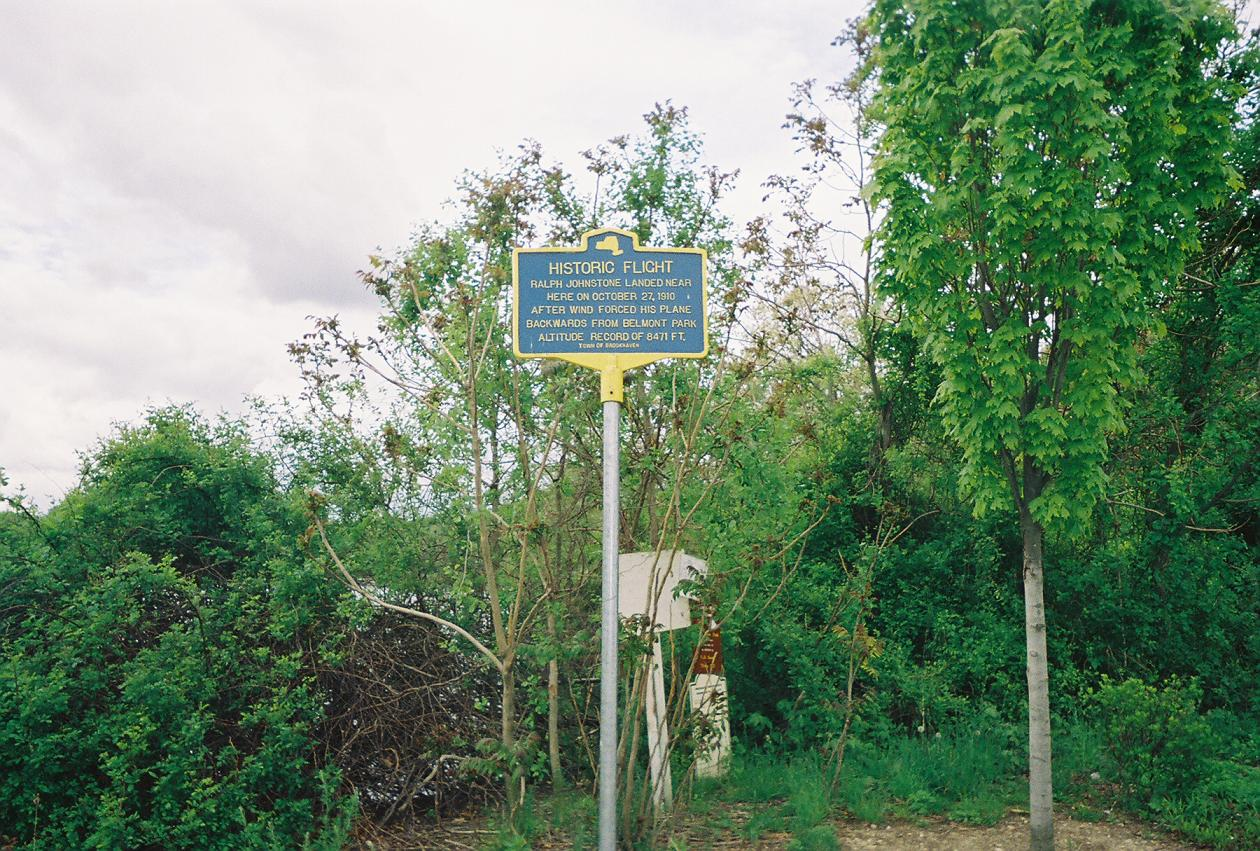
Plaque on NY 25 at Artist Lake, commemorating the spot where Ralph Johnstone's plane landed in 1910

On October 27, 1910, the International Aviation Tournament was held at the Belmont Park racetrack in Elmont, New York. The meet offered $3,750 for the highest altitude, another $1,000 for a world record and a $5,000 bonus for exceeding 10,000 feet. Ralph Johnstone set a new American flight altitude record of 8,471 feet. During the flight, a gust of wind forced him to fly backwards, and he landed near Artist Lake.

Middle Island gained an influx of Estonian refugees during the 1940s and 1950s mainly around the Pine Lake area.

== Geography ==
According to the United States Census Bureau, the CDP has a total area of 8.3 square miles (21.5 km^{2}), of which 8.2 square miles (21.3 km^{2}) is land and 0.077 square miles (0.2 km^{2}) – or 0.71% – is water.

Middle Island has several lakes, including Artist Lake, Pine Lake, and Spring Lake. Middle Island also contains the headwaters of the Carmans River, which originally began at Pfeiffer's Pond on the northeast corner of NY 25 and Old Middle Island Road, and now begins within Cathedral Pines County Park.

== Demographics ==
Historical population
| Census | Pop. | Note | %± |
|---|---|---|---|
| 2000 | 9,702 | | — |
| 2010 | 10,483 | | 8.0% |
| 2020 | 10,546 | | 0.6% |
U.S. Decennial Census

=== 2020 census ===
As of the 2020 census, Middle Island had a population of 10,546. The median age was 46.5 years. 17.6% of residents were under the age of 18 and 21.8% of residents were 65 years of age or older. For every 100 females there were 89.7 males, and for every 100 females age 18 and over there were 86.1 males age 18 and over.

94.8% of residents lived in urban areas, while 5.2% lived in rural areas.

There were 4,375 households in Middle Island, of which 24.7% had children under the age of 18 living in them. Of all households, 41.2% were married-couple households, 16.6% were households with a male householder and no spouse or partner present, and 34.7% were households with a female householder and no spouse or partner present. About 30.1% of all households were made up of individuals and 13.7% had someone living alone who was 65 years of age or older.

There were 4,588 housing units, of which 4.6% were vacant. The homeowner vacancy rate was 1.3% and the rental vacancy rate was 5.4%.

Racial composition as of the 2020 census
| Race | Number | Percent |
|---|---|---|
| White | 7,529 | 71.4% |
| Black or African American | 1,396 | 13.2% |
| American Indian and Alaska Native | 60 | 0.6% |
| Asian | 287 | 2.7% |
| Native Hawaiian and Other Pacific Islander | 7 | 0.1% |
| Some other race | 441 | 4.2% |
| Two or more races | 826 | 7.8% |
| Hispanic or Latino (of any race) | 1,290 | 12.2% |

=== 2000 census ===
As of the 2000 census, there were 9,702 people, 3,720 households, and 2,548 families residing in the CDP. The population density was 1,175.9 inhabitants per square mile (454.0/km^{2}). There were 3,900 housing units at an average density of 472.7 per square mile (182.5/km^{2}). The racial makeup of the CDP was 85.45% White, 7.58% African American, 0.25% Native American, 2.44% Asian, 0.06% Pacific Islander, 1.92% from other races, and 2.31% from two or more races. Hispanic or Latino of any race were 6.87% of the population.

Of the 3,720 households, 31.2% had children under the age of 18 living with them, 51.0% were married couples living together, 13.2% had a female householder with no husband present, and 31.5% were non-families. 23.7% of all households were made up of individuals, and 6.9% had someone living alone who was 65 years of age or older. The average household size was 2.53 and the average family size was 3.01.

In the CDP, the population was spread out, with 22.5% under the age of 18, 8.2% from 18 to 24, 32.6% from 25 to 44, 22.9% from 45 to 64, and 13.7% who were 65 years of age or older. The median age was 37 years. For every 100 females, there were 90.6 males. For every 100 females age 18 and over, there were 86.9 males.

The median income for a household in the CDP was $50,818, and the median income for a family was $58,171. Males had a median income of $41,618 versus $30,516 for females. The per capita income for the CDP was $23,129. About 4.3% of families and 6.3% of the population were below the poverty threshold, including 7.9% of those under age 18 and 6.6% of those age 65 or over.

== Parks and recreation ==
Parks within Middle Island include, Cathedral Pines County Park (formerly a Boy Scout camp) and the adjacent Prosser Pines Nature Preserve. Middle Island is surrounded by three public golf courses; Middle Island Country Club and Spring Lake Golf Club are both within Middle Island; Mill Pond Golf Course is just to the south, in Yaphank.

== Education ==
Middle Island is served by the Longwood Central School District, which at 58 square miles (150 km^{2}) is the largest school district on Long Island.

The community is also served by the Longwood Public Library, which is located within Middle Island.

== Media ==
Transmitter facilities for WFTY-DT are located in Middle Island.

== Notable people ==
- Albert B. Randall, Commodore of the United States Lines and Knight (Chevalier) of the Legion D'Honnere
