= Middle Island Presbyterian Church =

Historic church in New York, United States

- U.S. National Register of Historic Places
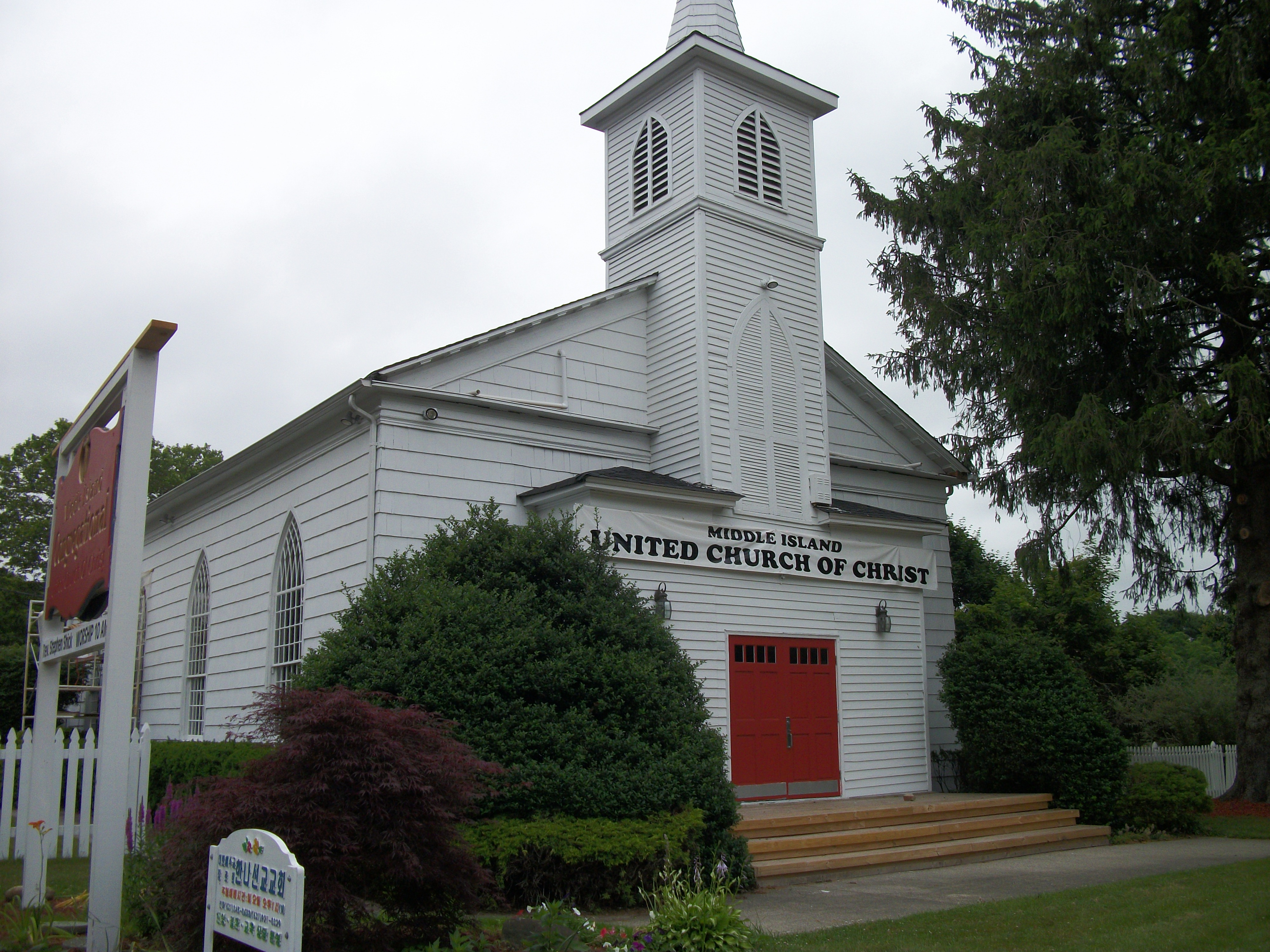

- Location within New York Location within the United States
- Location: 271 Middle Country Road; Middle Island, New York
- Coordinates: 40°52′49″N 72°57′48″W
- Area: less than one acre
- Built: 1837
- Architect: Hudson, Isaac
- Architectural style: Federal
- NRHP reference No.: 05001388
- Added to NRHP: December 07, 2005

Middle Island Presbyterian Church (now known as Middle Island United Church of Christ) is a historic Presbyterian church at 271 Middle Country Road in Middle Island, Suffolk County, New York.

The Federal style church building was constructed in 1837 by the Middle Island Presbyterian congregation with several later renovations and additions. The Presbyterian congregation built a new building in 1966. Later, a United Church of Christ congregation purchased the 1837 church building. The historic church building was added to the National Register of Historic Places in 2005.
