= South Haven, New York =

South Haven
- Hamlet
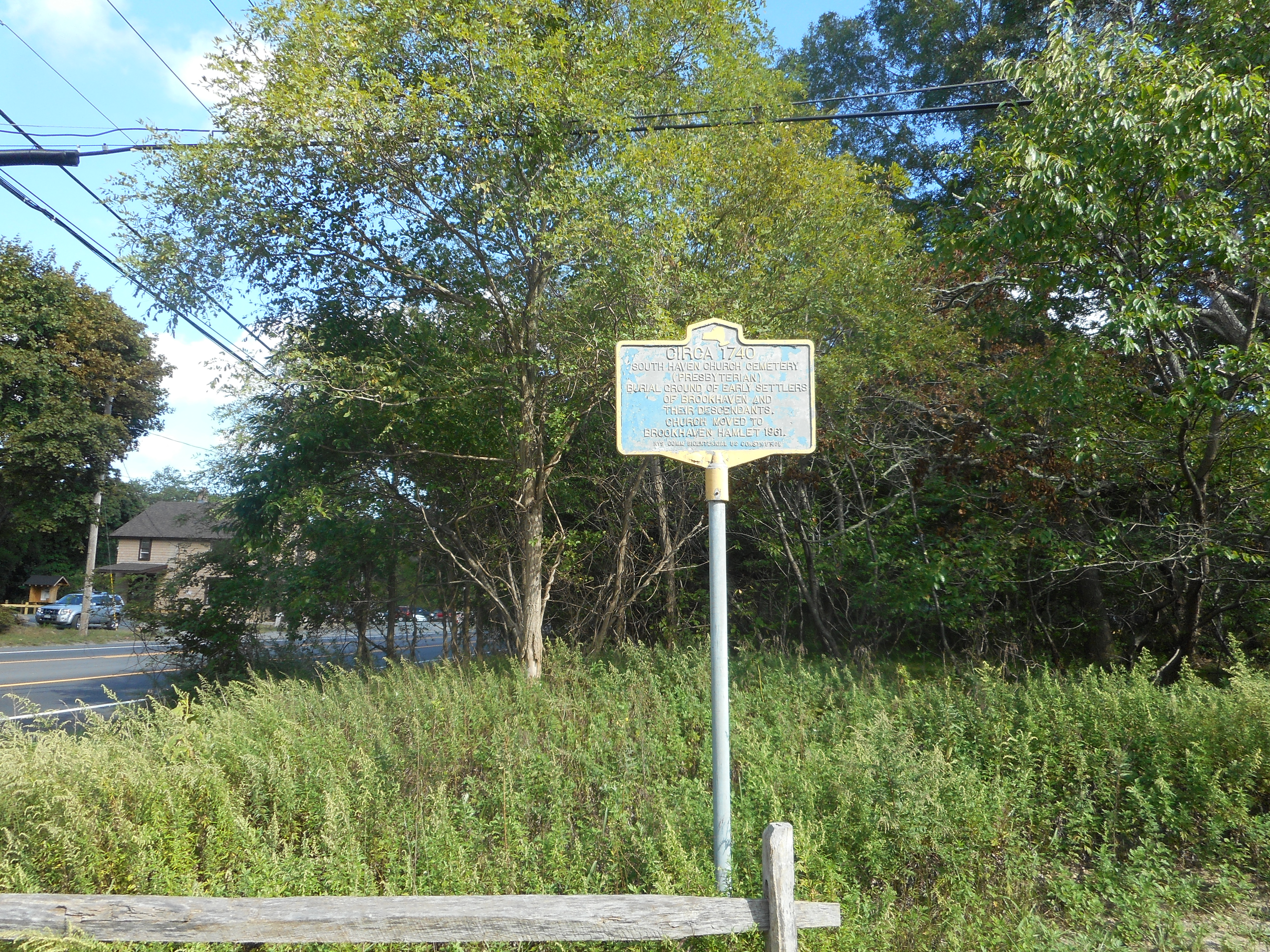
- Plaque for the historic South Haven Presbyterian Church Cemetery just off of Montauk Highway

- Location within the state of New York
- Coordinates: 40°47′57.5″N 72°53′42″W
- Country: United States
- State: New York
- County: Suffolk
- Town: Brookhaven
- Time zone: UTC-5 (Eastern (EST))
  - Summer (DST): UTC-4 (EDT)
- ZIP codes: 11719
- Area codes: 631, 934

South Haven is a hamlet in Suffolk County, New York, United States, on the south shore of Long Island.

South Haven is part of the Town of Brookhaven, and is not to be confused with the hamlet of Brookhaven, with which it shares a ZIP Code.

== History ==
South Haven was the shortened form of the original name of the hamlet: South Brookhaven.

== Geography ==
South Haven is dominated by two large parcels of parkland: South Haven County Park, and the Wertheim National Wildlife Refuge.

== In popular culture ==
Element One made a progressive trance song called "South Haven" in 2009.
