= Jack Eddington =

American politician

Jack Eddington was a member of the Suffolk County, New York Legislature, representing the 7th District, which encompasses southwestern through central portions of Brookhaven Town. The communities included in the 7th Legislative District include Blue Point, Patchogue, East Patchogue, North Patchogue, most of Medford, and smaller portions of Coram, Farmingville, Holtsville, Ronkonkoma, Bellport, and Fire Island. Eddington is a member of the Independence Party.

First elected to the county legislature in 2005, Eddington served as the Chair of the Public Safety Committee. He actively encouraged the use of GPS technology in the Suffolk County Probation Department. Eddington has sponsored legislation on various issues, including a recent bill which ensures owners of private hydrants provide local agencies with results of water pressure testing. He introduced the law restricting outdoor wood-fired boilers. and sponsored legislation to reduce scrap metal theft His legislation to help preserve the small horse farm industry on Long Island is the first of its kind in the region.

Jack Eddington is a former educator and licensed clinical social worker and co-author of two published works: Impact Teaching, a drug prevention curriculum, and First Survive, Then Thrive: The Journey from Crisis to Transformation, a self-help manual. He spent 13 years (1980–1994)travelling from Maine to Virginia as a regional counselor and educator for the nationwide Drug Free Schools and Communities Program. From 1981 to 1984 he served as a Director of the Peer Leadership Program for the New York State Department of Substance Abuse Services. During that time he traveled throughout the state implementing drug prevention education programs. Jack Eddington served in the U.S. Navy for four years (1967–1971)and is a lifelong member of the Vietnam Veterans of American, Chapter 11, Suffolk; the American Legion, Post 1848, Medford; and the Amvets, Post 111, Patchogue.
