= County Route 83 (Suffolk County, New York) =

County road in Suffolk County, New York, US

County Route 83
- CR 83 highlighted in red

Route information
- Maintained by SCDPW
- Length: 11.55 mi (18.59 km)
- Existed: December 13, 1949–present

Major junctions
- South end: NY 27 in North Patchogue
- I-495 in Medford; NY 25 in Selden; NY 112 in Coram
- North end: NY 25A in Mount Sinai

Location
- Country: United States
- State: New York
- County: Suffolk

Highway system
- County routes in New York; County Routes in Suffolk County
← CR 82	→ CR 84

County Route 83 (CR 83) is a major north–south county road in Suffolk County, New York, in the United States. It runs from NY 27 (Sunrise Highway) exit 52A in North Patchogue to NY 25A in Mount Sinai. The road was to have to run further south along North Ocean Avenue and South Ocean Avenue through the village of Patchogue, but that proposal was canceled. CR 83 is known as North Ocean Avenue south of Granny Road in Medford and as Patchogue–Mount Sinai Road north of that point.

== Route description ==
CR 83 begins at an interchange with NY 27 (Sunrise Highway) in the hamlet of North Patchogue in the town of Brookhaven. CR 83 proceeds north from NY 27 as a county-maintained continuation of North Ocean Avenue, retaining the moniker northward as a four-lane surface road. At Shaber Road, the route crosses into the center of North Patchogue, the route leaves the commercial hamlet for a junction with CR 99 (Woodside Avenue). CR 83 continues northward through the town of Brookhaven, crossing past multiple residences and the route turns northwest, crossing into the Summerfield section. The route becomes a divided highway, crossing under a line of the Long Island Rail Road just west of the hamlet of Medford. Just north of the tracks, CR 83 crosses into an at-grade interchange with Long Island Avenue, which parallels the tracks.

CR 83 continues north along North Ocean Avenue as a four-lane surface road through Brookhaven, reaching a junction with Express Drive South, marking an interchange with the Long Island Expressway (I-495; exit 63). The route crosses through another commercial section, crossing a junction with CR 16 (Horseblock Road). CR 83 crosses a junction with Granny Road and becomes a four-lane expressway, changing monikers to Patchogue–Mount Sinai Road. Turning northeast, the median widens as the route crosses past several residential neighborhoods. The route passes the Bald Hill Cultural Park, crossing an interchange with South Bicycle Path, crossing northward and soon northwest through Brookhaven. The median shrinks again, turning northward into a junction with NY 25 (Middle Country Road). Continuing north along Patchogue–Mount Sinai Road, CR 83 turns northeast past Hawkins Path, entering an interchange with NY 112.

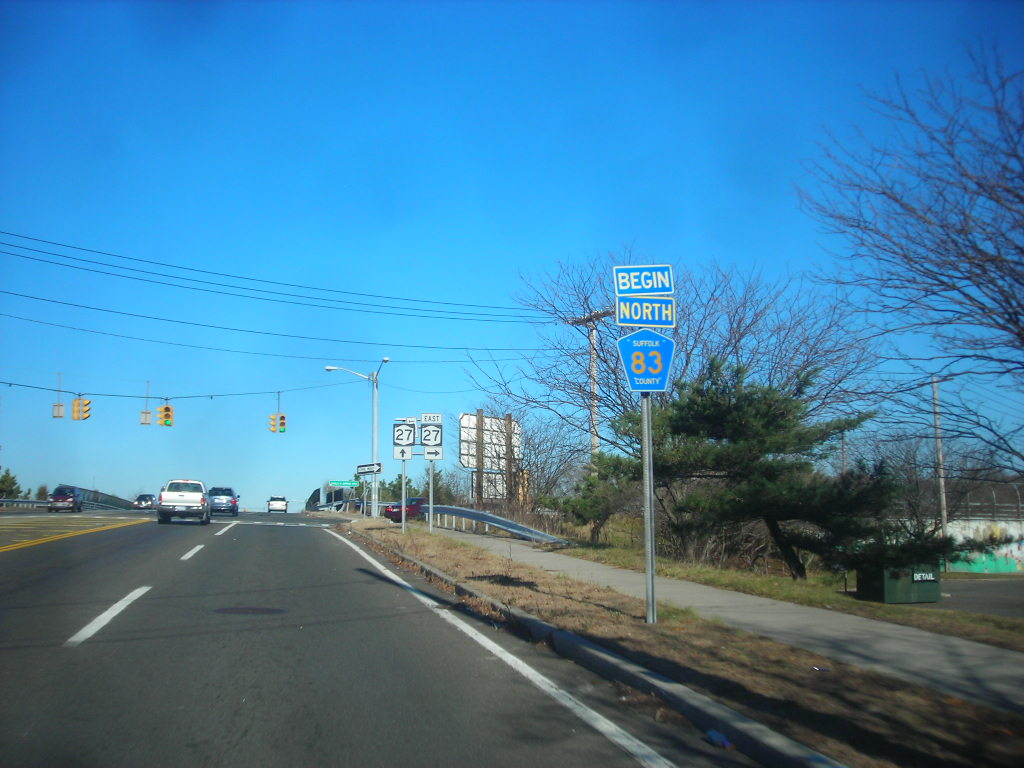
Signage marking the southern terminus of CR 83 in North Patchogue. The interchange with NY 27 is just ahead of the sign

After NY 112, CR 83 continues past Pine Ridge Golf Club, continuing northeast through Brookhaven as a four-lane expressway. The route turns northward, crossing an interchange with Canal Road. The route passes multiple residential communities, crossing a junction with Mount Sinai–Coram Road. After another northwestern turn, CR 83 reaches a junction with NY 25A in Mount Sinai. This junction marks the northern terminus of CR 83, whose right-of-way terminates at the junction a couple miles southeast of Mount Sinai Harbor and the Long Island Sound.

== History ==
=== Origins and former alignments ===
CR 83 was assigned on December 13, 1949. Until the late 1950s, North Ocean Avenue followed a more westerly alignment between Austin Avenue, immediately south of the interchange with NY 27 in North Patchogue, to CR 99 (Woodside Avenue). Today, the old road is still intact for the most part as Old North Ocean Avenue. The expansion of the Sunrise Highway east of Oakdale cut off the southern terminus between Austin and Willmarth avenues in the 1950s, but a frontage road reconnected the old and new sections. When the interchange with NY 27 was reconstructed in the late 1980s, another frontage road connecting Old North Ocean Avenue replaced the one that was built in the 1950s. The intersection with Woodside Avenue was eliminated in the mid-1970s.

North of Woodside Avenue, North Ocean Avenue initially utilized its present alignment up to Bayside Avenue in Patchogue Highlands. At a location between Bayside Avenue and Fairview Avenue, North Ocean Avenue broke from its present alignment, running parallel to the west of the modern routing between Fairview Avenue and Wrana Drive. Today, only two segments of the road remain in the form of First Avenue, a short, dead end street off Fairview Avenue, and Brookrun Drive, a street off Masonic Avenue with a dead end located south of the present CR 83–Wrana Drive intersection.

At Wrana Drive, North Ocean Avenue rejoined the current alignment for 0.7 miles (1.1 km) before separating at a location near Robinson Avenue and Petty Lane. The road rejoined the modern routing at the Long Island Lighting Company High Tension Line right-of-way midway between I-495 and CR 16. This segment was completely abandoned as North Ocean Avenue was realigned to accommodate exit 63 along I-495 (the Long Island Expressway).

Within Patchogue and North Patchogue, a trolley line used to run along South Ocean Avenue, North Ocean Avenue, and what is now Old North Ocean Avenue. This trolley line ran into Holbrook and veered to the northwest at Canaan Lake along what is known as Traction Boulevard, while the current Old North Ocean Avenue moved northeast.

=== Extension to Mount Sinai ===
A northward extension of North Ocean Avenue was built between 1971 and 1972 and named Patchogue–Mount Sinai Road. A housing development that was being built along Granny Road almost blocked construction of the roadway. The section in the vicinity of the former Bald Hill Ski Bowl was built in similar fashion to a limited-access highway to make driving through hilly region of Farmingville much easier. The bridge over South Bicycle Path was actually installed at least twelve years before the road was laid out. Loftier plans once existed to extend the limited-access status north of Mooney Pond Road, but legend has it they were literally crossed out in pencil.

Several junctions along the new road were once proposed to be upgraded into interchanges. Beyond Bald Hill, there was to be an interchange across NY 25. The northbound ramps to NY 25 were to be accessible to on and off ramps leading to a residential side street called New Lane. NY 112 had a proposed interchange as well that would have utilized Hawkins Road. For a short time, NY 112 acted as the northern terminus of CR 83. Farther north, the intersections with Canal Road and Coram–Mount Sinai Road would have been upgraded as part of the construction of two unbuilt highways, the Port Jefferson–Westhampton Beach Highway (CR 111) and the North Brookhaven Expressway (NY 347), respectively.

=== Upgrades and North Shore extensions ===
Patchogue–Mount Sinai Road was built as a four-lane highway, while North Ocean Avenue was originally a two-lane road. In the late 1940s, the one-lane arch bridge that carried the Long Island Rail Road over North Ocean Avenue was replaced with a concrete slab bridge with provisions for a second lane. From the 1940s into the 1970s, this bridge had an empty right of way for an unbuilt southbound lane, implying that the proposal to widen the road dated back to the post-war era. Long Island Avenue was a divided highway at this intersection decades before North Ocean Avenue was. By the mid-1970s, North Ocean Avenue was finally widened to four lanes as well, at least as far south as the Sunrise Highway (NY 27). This widening filled the gap beneath the bridge, but eliminated a connecting road to Brookrun Drive.

There were once plans to extend CR 83 northward beyond its northern terminus at NY 25A. Unlike most proposed highway extensions north of NY 25A, this proposal would have extended the highway north, then curve it east through Miller Place to Sound Beach. Another proposed spur would have led to the Cedar Beach Town Park, which lies on a peninsula separating Long Island Sound and Mount Sinai Harbor. The spur would have been designated CR 83A. Both proposals were stopped by highway opponents on the North Shore.

== Major intersections ==
The entire route is in Suffolk County.

Location	mi	km	Destinations	Notes
North Patchogue	0.00	0.00	NY 27 west	Southern terminus; exit 52A on NY 27
North Patchogue	1.09	1.75	CR 99 (Woodside Avenue)	
Medford	3.09– 3.22	4.97– 5.18	I-495 – New York, Riverhead	Exit 63 on I-495
Farmingville	3.63	5.84	CR 16 (Horseblock Road)	
Farmingville			Southern end of limited-access section	
Farmingville			South Bicycle Path	
Selden	6.32	10.17	NY 25 (Middle Country Road)	At-grade intersection
Coram	7.71	12.41	NY 112	At-grade intersection
Mount Sinai	11.55	18.59	NY 25A	Northern terminus; at-grade intersection
1.000 mi = 1.609 km; 1.000 km = 0.621 mi
