= New York State Route 112 =

Highway on Long Island, New York

New York State Route 112
- Map of Long Island and vicinity with NY 112 highlighted in red

Route information
- Maintained by NYSDOT
- Length: 12.50 mi (20.12 km)
- Existed: 1930–present

Major junctions
- South end: East Main Street in Patchogue
- NY 27 in Patchogue; I-495 in Medford; NY 347 at the Terryville–Port Jefferson Station line
- North end: NY 25A in Port Jefferson Station

Location
- Country: United States
- State: New York
- Counties: Suffolk

Highway system
- New York Highways; Interstate; US; State; Reference; Parkways
← NY 111	→ NY 113

New York State Route 112 (NY 112) is a state highway located entirely within the town of Brookhaven in Suffolk County, New York, in the United States. It runs from an intersection with East Main Street (former NY 27A) in the village of Patchogue to a junction with NY 25A in Port Jefferson Station. It is known locally as Medford Avenue in Patchogue and Patchogue Road in Terryville and Port Jefferson Station. The official name for the road outside these areas is "Patchogue–Port Jefferson Road", though it is often signed simply as "Route 112".

== Route description ==
NY 112 begins at an intersection with East Main Street in the village of Patchogue. The route proceeds northward as a four-lane commercial street as Medford Avenue. Near the intersection with Lakewood Street, NY 112 leaves the village of Patchogue, entering the town of Brookhaven. The route does not change going north, passing Medford Elementary School before entering interchange 53 of Sunrise Highway (NY 27) in the census-designated place of North Patchogue. NY 112 crosses over the Sunrise, continuing north as Medford Avenue as the four-lane boulevard it was prior to the interchange. At the intersection with Shaber Road, the route bends to the northeast, changing names to Medford Road and crossing an intersection with CR 99 (Woodside Avenue), a four-lane arterial through Brookhaven.

Continuing north from CR 99, NY 112 condenses down to two lanes (one in each direction), remaining a commercial arterial. NY 112 passes Tremont Elementary School before crossing Greenport Road, continuing northward into the census-designated place of Medford. In Medford, NY 112 continues north, crossing under the Long Island Rail Road's Greenport Branch next to the Medford station. After crossing under the tracks, NY 112 continues northeast through Medford, entering interchange 64 of the Long Island Expressway (I-495) and expanding to four lanes once again before an intersection with CR 16 (Horse Block Road). The route returns to two lanes after CR 16, passing east of Blue Ridge Golf Club and Holy Sepulchre Cemetery. At this point, NY 112 changes names from Medford Avenue to Port Jefferson–Patchogue Road.

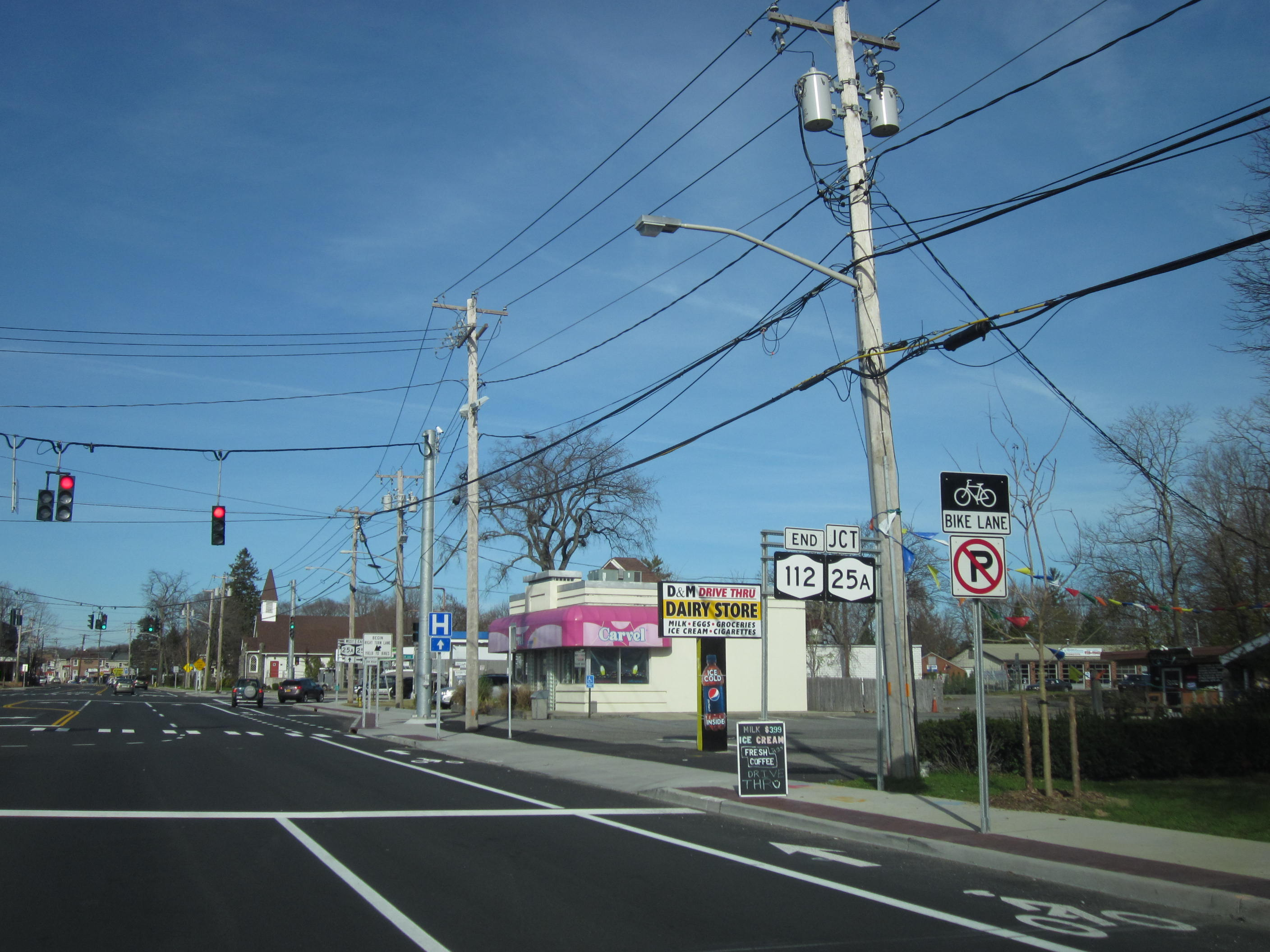
NY 112 approaching its northern terminus, an intersection with NY 25A in Port Jefferson Station

Continuing north through Brookhaven, NY 112 intersects a former alignment of itself, entering the census-designated place of Coram. In Coram, NY 112 bends to the northwest at an intersection with Grand Smith Road, immediately intersecting with NY 25 (Middle Country Road). The two roads parallel each other westward, NY 112 becoming a residential street in the middle of a large housing complex in Coram before turning northward and into an at-grade interchange with CR 83 (Patchogue–Mount Sinai Road). NY 112 continues north out of the interchange and Coram, turning northwest as a two-lane residential arterial. After Birchwood Road, NY 112 becomes commercial once again, bending further to the northwest.

After the bend, NY 112 continues through Brookhaven, crossing a large shopping plaza into the census-designated place of Port Jefferson Station. In Port Jefferson Station, NY 112 intersects with NY 347 (Nesconset Highway), a wide arterial boulevard in the town of Brookhaven. The route continues northwest away from NY 347 as a four-lane commercial street, now under the moniker of Patchogue Road. Just after entering the downtown portion of Port Jefferson Station, NY 112 intersects with NY 25A (Hallock Avenue). At this intersection, NY 112 terminates, the right-of-way continues north as NY 25A and Main Street, connecting to the namesake train station on the Port Jefferson Branch.

== History ==
NY 112 was known as the Patchogue Stage Road in the 19th and early 20th centuries, serving as the main thoroughfare for New England residents taking stagecoaches from Port Jefferson to Patchogue. Additionally, the Medford Avenue segment in Patchogue and North Patchogue was part of the historic Long Island Bicycle Path, which ran from Patchogue to Port Jefferson in the 1890s and into the early 20th century. Most of the old stage road was acquired by the state of New York in 1913; however, the section within the Patchogue village limits did not become state-maintained until the 1920s. The Patchogue–Port Jefferson state highway did not receive a posted designation until the 1930 renumbering of state highways in New York, when it became NY 112.

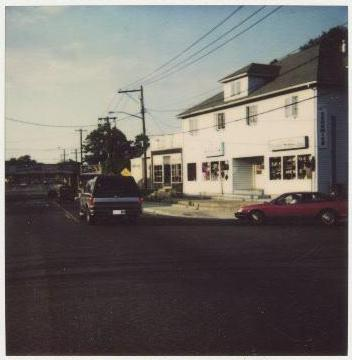
NY 112 near LIRR Bridge in Medford that was built in 1940

Parts of NY 112 have been realigned to bypass curves or turns in the original stage road. One former segment lies behind a New York State Department of Transportation (NYSDOT) maintenance yard in Coram. Other highways that were once part of NY 112 include part of Middle Island Road and an abandoned road in Medford; a section near Pine Road in Coram; and a segment near East Gate in Terryville. In the 1960s and 1970s, NYSDOT wanted to realign both NY 112 and NY 25 in Coram. Plans to realign NY 112 in this area date as far back as the 1930s.

The route originally crossed the Long Island Rail Road in Medford by way of a dangerous grade crossing. It was replaced with a steel bridge in 1940, 13 years after a driver was killed while traversing the crossing. The bridge has a low 12-foot-9-inch (3.89 m) clearance. In 1964, the segment of NY 112 in Patchogue between East Main and Clark streets was widened to four lanes.

When the Long Island Expressway (Interstate 495) was built across central Suffolk County between 1969 and 1971, NY 112 was widened to a four-lane divided highway in the vicinity of the new expressway. This project included tilting the curved embankment of the southbound lane, which has created a series of floods in moderate to heavy rainstorms.

== Major intersections ==
The entire route is in Suffolk County.

Location	mi	km	Destinations	Notes
Patchogue	0.00	0.00	East Main Street – Bellport, Sayville	Southern terminus; former NY 27A/CR 80
North Patchogue–East Patchogue line	0.89	1.43	NY 27 (Sunrise Highway) – New York, Montauk	Exit 53 on NY 27
Medford	4.07	6.55	I-495 (Long Island Expressway) – New York, Riverhead	Exit 64 on I-495
Medford	4.26	6.86	CR 16 (Horseblock Road) – Farmingville, Shirley	
Coram	7.22	11.62	NY 25 (Middle Country Road) – Port Jefferson, Riverhead	
Coram	8.43	13.57	CR 83 (Patchogue–Mount Sinai Road) – Mount Sinai, Selden	
Terryville–Port Jefferson Station line	11.94	19.22	NY 347 (Nesconset Highway) – Smithtown, Rocky Point	Former roundabout
Port Jefferson Station	12.50	20.12	NY 25A (Hallock Avenue / Main Street)	Northern terminus
1.000 mi = 1.609 km; 1.000 km = 0.621 mi
