= New York State Route 25 =

Highway on Long Island, New York

New York State Route 25
- NY 25 highlighted in red and former reference routes in blue

Route information
- Maintained by NYSDOT, NYCDOT and the village of Greenport
- Length: 105.07 mi (169.09 km)
- Existed: mid-1920s–present

Major junctions
- West end: 2nd Avenue in Manhattan
- I-278 in Woodside; I-495 in Rego Park; I-678 in Kew Gardens; I-295 / NY 24 / Grand Central Parkway in Hollis Hills; Cross Island Parkway at the Bellerose–Bellerose Terrace line Northern State Parkway at the Mineola–Westbury line I-495 in Jericho; NY 135 in Syosset; CR 14 / Sunken Meadow State Parkway in Commack; I-495 / CR 58 in Calverton
- East end: Orient Point Ferry Landing in Orient

Location
- Country: United States
- State: New York
- Counties: New York, Queens, Nassau, Suffolk

Highway system
- New York Highways; Interstate; US; State; Reference; Parkways
← NY 24	→ NY 25A

New York State Route 25 (NY 25) is an east–west state highway in downstate New York in the United States. The route extends along the central parts and North Shore of Long Island for just over 105 miles (169 km) from east midtown Manhattan in New York City to the Cross Sound Ferry terminal at Orient Point on the end of Long Island's North Fork. NY 25 is carried from Manhattan to Queens by way of the double-decked Queensboro Bridge over the East River.

NY 25 is unique among New York State Routes on Long Island, as it is the only one to leave the geographical boundaries of Long Island, albeit minimally; it ends at the western terminus of the Queensboro Bridge. It is also one of only two signed New York State routes in Manhattan (the other is NY 9A). Additionally, NY 25 is the second-longest highway on Long Island after its South Shore counterpart: NY 27 (Sunrise Highway / Montauk Highway).

NY 25 runs along several differently-named roads. In the borough of Queens, it is called Queens Boulevard, Hillside Avenue and finally Braddock Avenue. Braddock Avenue ends immediately upon crossing over the Cross Island Parkway. At that point, NY 25 turns east onto Jericho Turnpike, which runs along the Queens-Nassau border from Braddock Avenue to 257th Street. Continuing east through Nassau and western Suffolk counties, NY 25 retains the name Jericho Turnpike. Further east, the highway becomes Main Street in Smithtown, Middle Country Road in central Suffolk, Main Street again in Riverhead, and finally Main Road in eastern Suffolk.

Two alternate routings exist bearing the designation NY 25 Truck, both along the North Fork. They began as two separate routes, one between Laurel and Mattituck and the other in the vicinity of Greenport; however, they were effectively merged after a truck route was established between Mattituck and Greenport.

== Route description ==
=== Manhattan and Queens ===
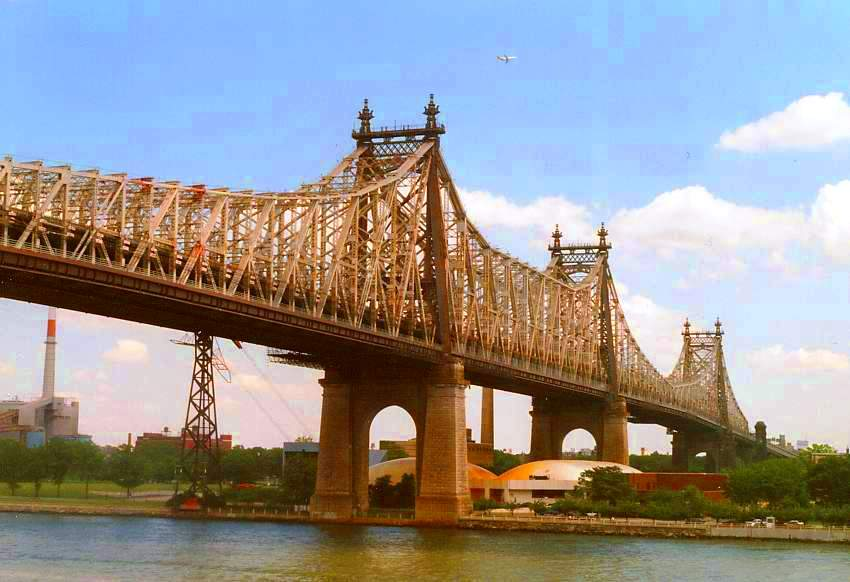
NY 25 crossing the East River on the Queensboro Bridge

NY 25 begins near Second Avenue in Manhattan, at the western end of the double-decked Queensboro Bridge spanning the East River and Roosevelt Island. East of the bridge, NY 25 becomes Queens Boulevard at the intersection with NY 25A, in the Long Island City section of the borough of Queens. Queens Plaza is based around this section of the road.

In Long Island City, NY 25 runs southeast beneath the elevated tracks of the IRT Flushing Line. At Thompson Avenue, the route turns to run eastward as the multi-lane divided Queens Boulevard, straddling the Flushing Line's elevated structure eastward to 48th Street, at which point the Flushing Line turns northeast onto Roosevelt Avenue and Queens Boulevard becomes 6 lanes in each direction, with main and service roads. In Woodside, NY 25 meets I-278 at exit 39. In Elmhurst, the road runs over the eponymous subway line starting at the intersection with Grand Avenue and Broadway. In Corona, the road intersects the Long Island Expressway (I-495) and the northern terminus of Woodhaven Boulevard.

Outside of Rego Park, NY 25 turns slightly southeast towards Forest Hills and Jamaica. In Kew Gardens the route is connected to the westbound and eastbound roadways of Union Turnpike and passes over the Jackie Robinson Parkway without access. Near Jamaica, the road meets I-678 at exit 9, a partial interchange. Three blocks southeast of I-678, NY 25 turns east and is known as Hillside Avenue, a city street that begins at Jamaica Avenue in Richmond Hill near the site of the closed LIRR station. This section of NY 25 is undivided but has several lanes in the Jamaica-Hollis area. In Queens Village the route connects with both I-295 and NY 24 at an interchange that serves as NY 24's western end and I-295's southern terminus. East of I-295, NY 25 intersects the western terminus of NY 25B; NY 25 turns southeast onto Braddock Avenue while Hillside Avenue continues east as Route 25B.

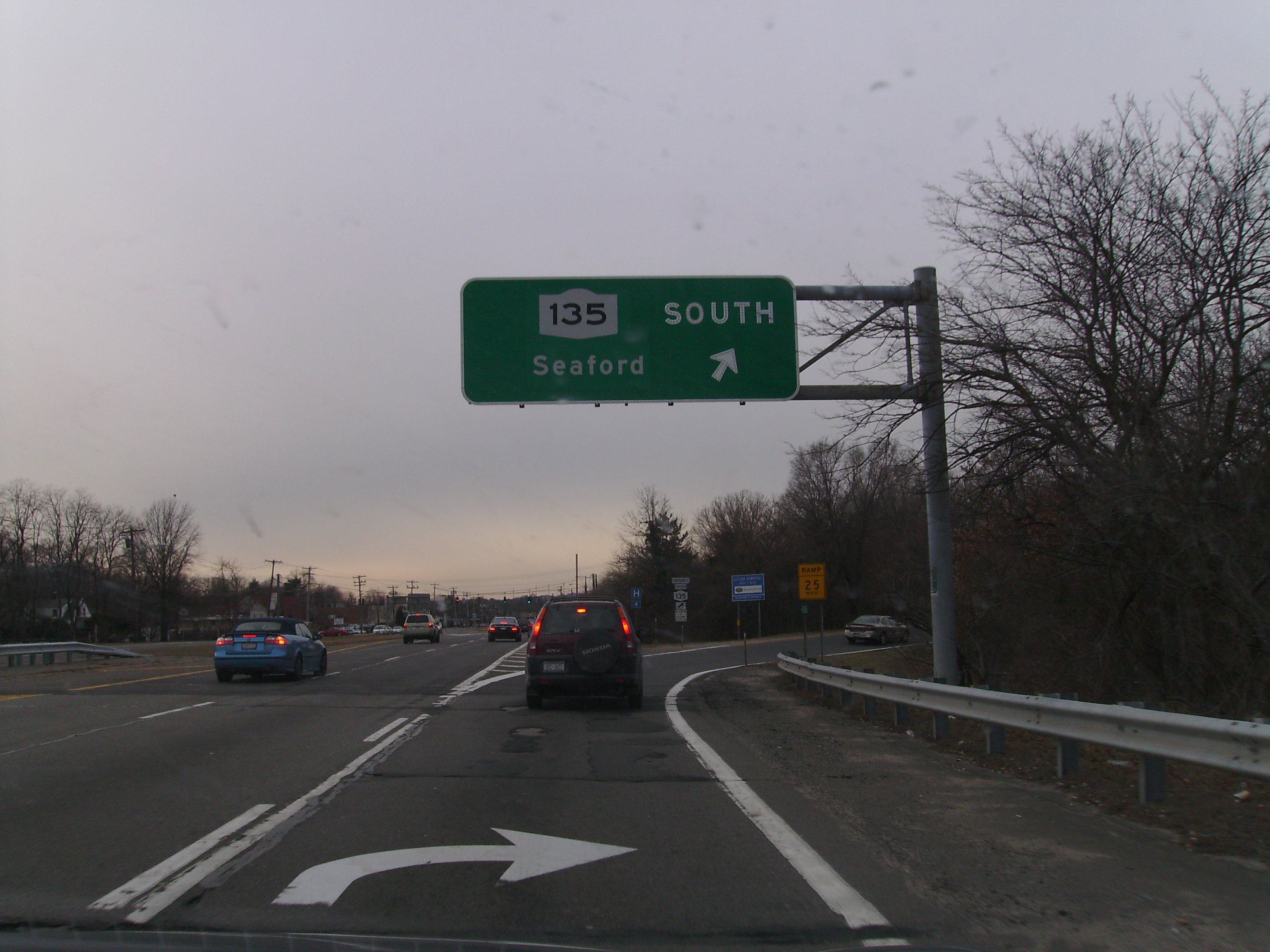
NY 135 exit on NY 25

In Bellerose, the roadway passes over the Cross Island Parkway and turns east onto Jericho Turnpike. This section, to just before 257th Street, is the border between the Bellerose and Floral Park neighborhoods of Queens to the north and the villages of Bellerose and Floral Park in Nassau County to the south. The westbound lanes are in New York City, whereas the eastbound lanes are in Nassau County.

=== Nassau and Suffolk counties ===
NY 25B and Hillside Avenue merge into NY 25 in Mineola. NY 25 continues in this area as a divided highway and parallels the Northern State Parkway. NY 25 again intersects with the Long Island Expressway in Jericho. NY 106 and NY 107 interchange with NY 25 in downtown Jericho, however the exit is not numbered.

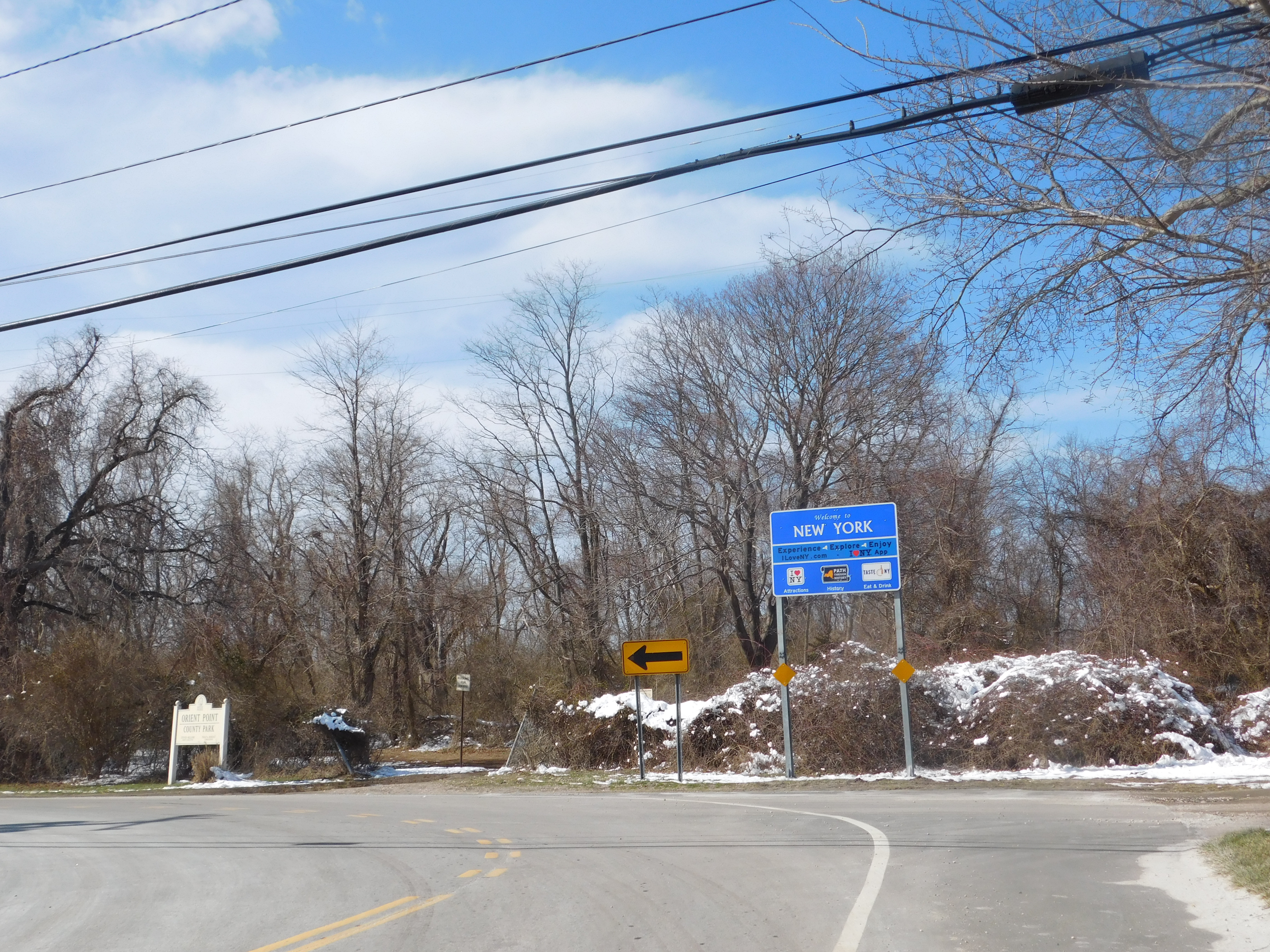
NY 25 in Orient Point after leaving the Cross Sound Ferry

The northern end of the Seaford–Oyster Bay Expressway (NY 135) terminates at NY 25 in Syosset. NY 110 intersects at the 32.76-mile (52.72 km) mark, in South Huntington. NY 454 begins at an intersection with NY 25 in Commack. Just after the NY 454 intersection, NY 25 meets the Sunken Meadow State Parkway by way of an interchange. NY 25A, a spur of NY 25, becomes concurrent with NY 25 in Smithtown. In Village of the Branch, NY 25A leaves to the north where NY 111 intersects from the south. New York State Bicycle Route 25 (NYS Bike Route 25) also begins along NY 25A at this intersection.

NY 347 intersects at 47.93 miles (77.14 km) in Nesconset. In Coram, NY 25 intersects with NY 112. NY 25A ends at NY 25 in Calverton, and NYS Bike Route 25 joins NY 25 on its way to Orient Point, with occasional diversions in Riverhead, Aquebogue, and Greenport. Four miles (6.4 km) later, NY 25 encounters the Long Island Expressway one final time at another interchange. 20 miles (32 km) further eastward, in Greenport, NY 25 intersects with NY 114 at its northern terminus. NY 25 continues on the northeastern end of Long Island for the final ten miles (16 km). NY 25 enters Orient and ends at the Orient Point Ferry Landing. An attraction along NY 25 in Orient is Orient Beach State Park.

== History ==
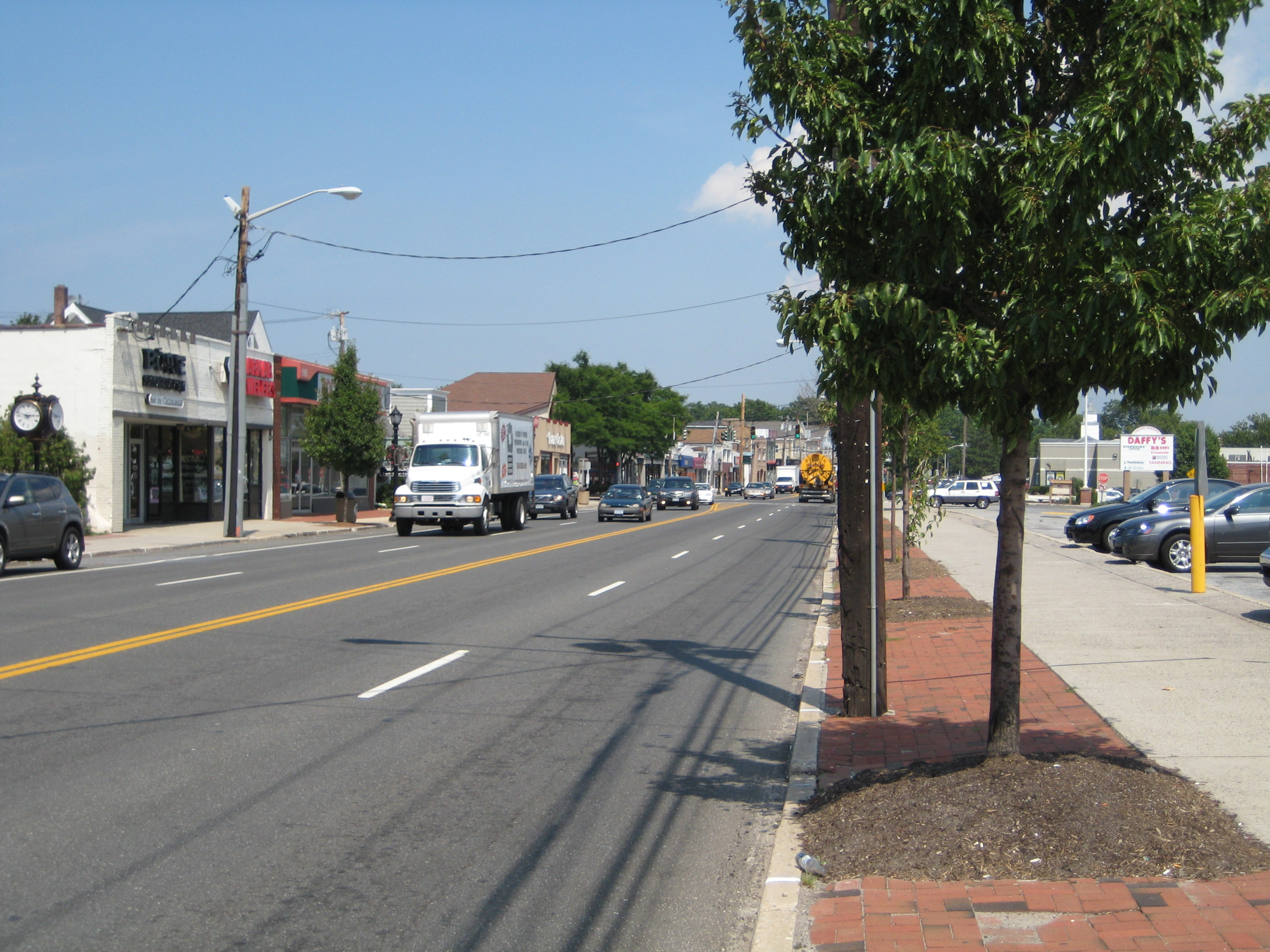
NY 25 and 25A overlap in Smithtown.

NY 25 was assigned in the 1924 along all of what is now NY 25A east of the New York City line and its current alignment from the modern east end of NY 25A to Greenport. At the time, the section of modern NY 25 between the New York City line and Smithtown was state-maintained but unnumbered. It was designated as NY 25A c. 1927.

In 1929, NY 25 was realigned to follow Jericho Turnpike and Middle Country Road between Smithtown and Riverhead while its former alignment to the north became part of NY 25A.

In the 1930 renumbering of state highways in New York, the routings of NY 25 and NY 25A were flipped west of Smithtown, placing both routes on their current alignments. NY 25 was extended east to Orient Point c. 1932.

NY 25 was one of several routes that was extended west into New York City in mid-December 1934 when the city signed routes within its limits for the first time. The route followed Jericho Turnpike, Braddock Avenue, Springfield Boulevard, Horace Harding Boulevard, and several smaller streets (including Corona, Woodside, and Skillman Avenues) westward to Queens Boulevard, then part of NY 24. NY 25 joined NY 24 here, overlapping NY 24 (and NY 25A west of Northern Boulevard) along Queens Boulevard and across the Queensboro Bridge into Manhattan. The three routes continued west for several more blocks along 2nd Avenue and 57th Street to Park Avenue (then NY 22 and NY 100), where NY 24, NY 25, and NY 25A all ended. At the time, the segment of modern NY 25 between Skillman Avenue and 212th Street was part of NY 24.

In 1938, NY 25 was realigned to follow Queens Boulevard (NY 24) from Skillman Avenue to Horace Harding Boulevard, where NY 25 turned eastward to follow Horace Harding Boulevard back to its original alignment at Corona Avenue.

The route was altered in 1940 to follow an even more southerly alignment between Horace Harding and Springfield Boulevards via Queens Boulevard and Union Turnpike. NY 25 went unchanged until January 1, 1970, when NY 24 was truncated to begin at the junction of 212th Street and Hillside Avenue. NY 24's former alignment along Queens Boulevard and Hillside Avenue became part of a realigned NY 25, which also used a previously unnumbered segment of Hillside Avenue between 212th Street and Braddock Avenue.

In 1941, the New York City Planning Department proposed converting Queens Boulevard into a freeway, as was done with the Van Wyck Expressway, from the Queensboro Bridge to Hillside Avenue. The boulevard would be converted to an expressway with grade separation at the more important intersections, and by closing off access from minor streets. As part of the project, the express lanes of Queens Boulevard were depressed in the area of Woodhaven Boulevard and Horace Harding Boulevard (later turned into the Long Island Expressway), while the local lanes were kept at grade level. The plan to upgrade the boulevard was delayed with the onset of World War II, and was never completed.

In 1942, NY 24 was realigned to enter Manhattan by way of the Queens–Midtown Tunnel. As a result, NY 24 now left NY 25 at what is now exit 36 on the Brooklyn–Queens Expressway.

On November 18, 1949, the Traffic Commission approved the retiming of traffic signals along the entirety of Queens Boulevard to speed traffic, which would take effect about February 1, 1950. The change, known as the "triple-offset system" was expected to reduce peak congestion, like what was done on the Grand Concourse. Westbound traffic would be favored from 7 to 9 a.m., while eastbound traffic would be favored from 5 to 7 p.m. The Boulevard handled 73,000 cars on an average weekday, with a peak of 7,600 cars an hour towards Manhattan, and a peak of 6,700 to points east.

The overlap with NY 25A was removed by 1952 after that route was truncated to the intersection of Northern and Queens Boulevards.

The overlaps with both NY 24 and NY 25A into Manhattan were eliminated in 1964.

NY 25 continued to extend into Manhattan until the 1964 when NY 22 was truncated to end in the North Bronx.

Westbound traffic on NY 25 continued off the Queensboro Bridge onto 60th Street to Park Avenue, where it turned south, then west along 57th Street to its terminus at the West Side Highway (NY 9A). Eastbound traffic traveled on 57th Street from NY 9A to the Queensboro Bridge entrance ramp. In 1967, NY 25 was truncated to end in Queens as a result.

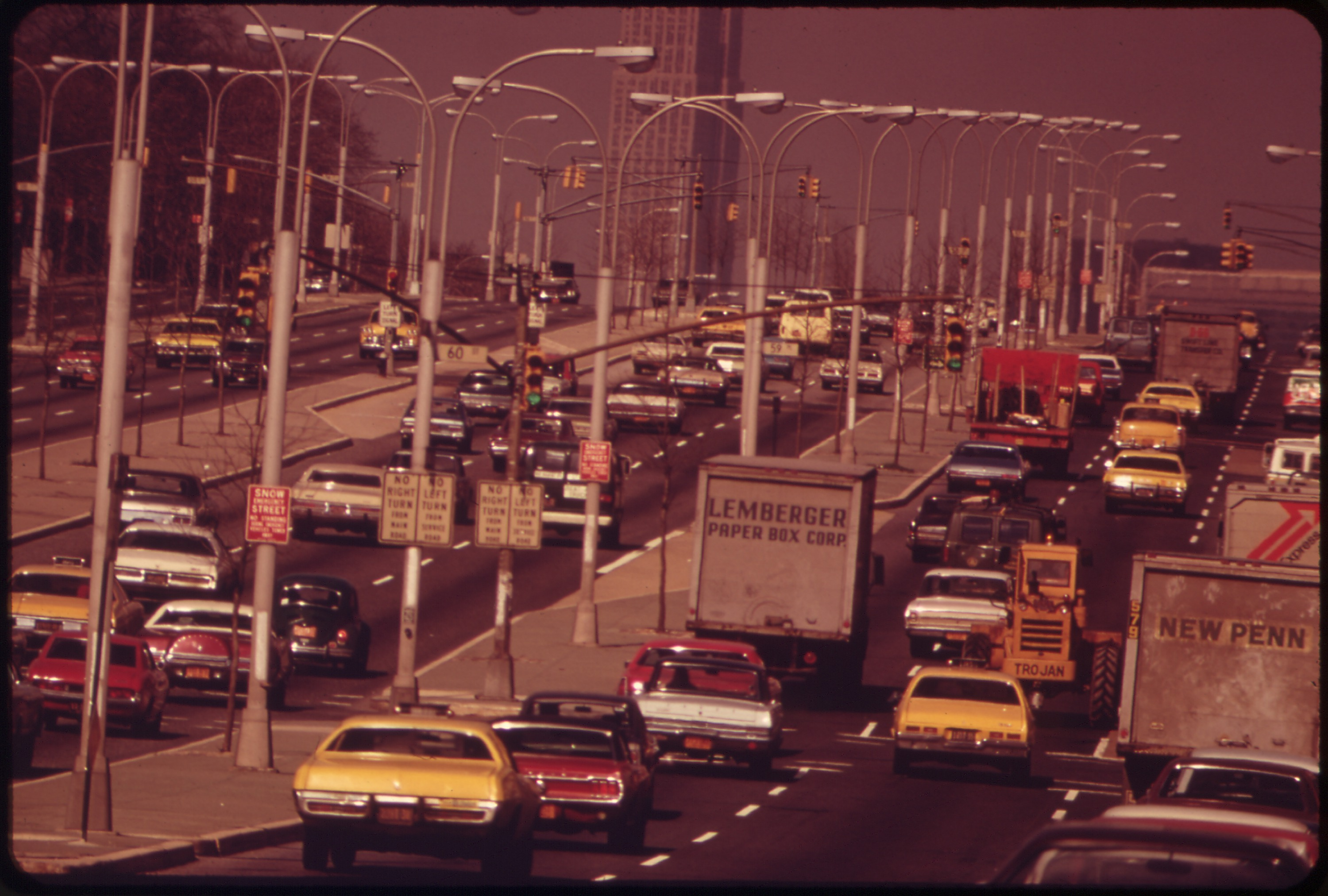
At 59th Street, looking toward the East River and Manhattan, 1973

In 1960, Queens borough president John T. Clancy proposed reconstructing the entire seven-mile boulevard to meet traffic demand from the 1964 New York World's Fair for $17.1 million. Due to bureaucratic issues and the need to finance the project using city funds, the project was delayed and cut back to a 2.5 mile section for $2.6 million. Underpasses at Union Turnpike and at Grand Avenue—Broadway were dropped from the plan. On September 3, 1964, the Department of Highways announced that the project was far behind the project's original schedule. Only $2.6 million for the central section of the project was approved as rebuilding more than a mile of the road a time was deemed to be too disruptive for travel. At the time, the rebuilding of the first 1-mile section from 70th Avenue to Union Turnpike was completed. The six service road lanes were resurfaced, yellow asphalt surfacing was installed to guide drivers turning at intersections, and malls were narrowed to widen the roadway and provide space for cars turning off the six-lane main roadway. Work on the 63rd Drive to 70th Avenue section was 70 percent complete, and the Department of Highways expected to request the release of $400,000 for the section to Woodhaven Boulevard within two weeks. Work on that section was expected to start in 1965. Queens Boulevard handled more than 85,000 vehicles a day, making it the second busiest roadway in the city, after the Long Island Expressway, which handled 125,000 vehicles a day.

In 1969, many traffic lights in Queens were computerized, reducing travel time by as much as 25 percent during off-peak hours, and as much as 39 percent during rush hour.

On January 1, 1970, the road was reextended across the Queensboro Bridge to a new terminus at FDR Drive.

The interchange between I-495 and CR 58 in Riverhead was completed as a result of I-495's eastern completion. This interchange was fully operational by 1972. It features grade separated ramps, high-speed banked curves, and interstate standard signing.

In the early 1970s, the New York State Department of Transportation (NYSDOT) wanted to install frontage roads along a divided NY 25 between Nesconset and Lake Grove as part of a proposed upgrade of NY 347 into a freeway.

In the 1960s and 1970s, NYSDOT wanted to realign both NY 25 and NY 112 in Coram. The realignment and widening of NY 25 was to take place between NY 112 and Winfield Davis Drive.

A traffic light at Manor Road was installed at the time of completion of Splish Splash Water Park in 1991.

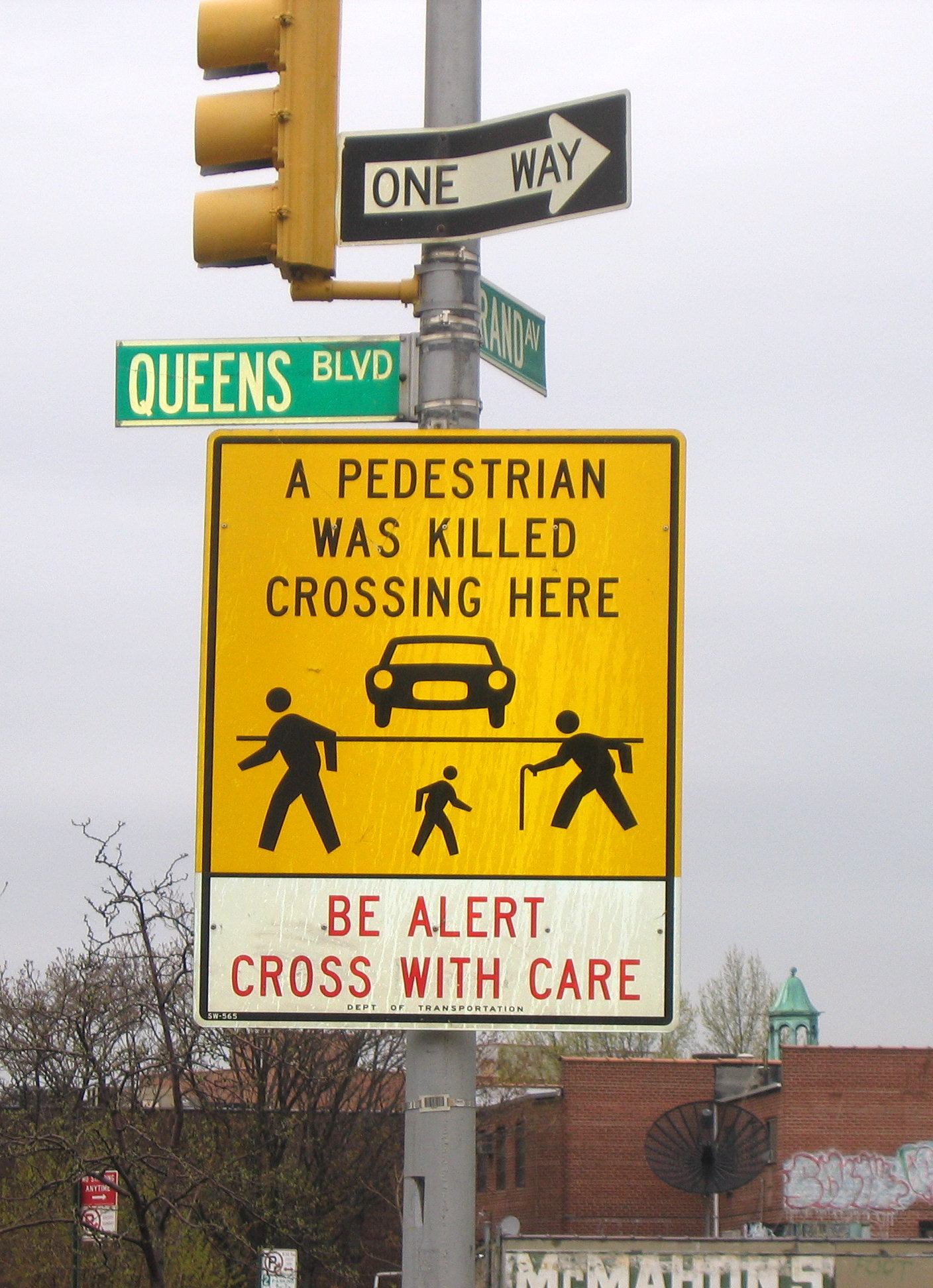
"A Pedestrian Was Killed Crossing Here" sign on Queens Boulevard at Grand Avenue in Elmhurst

In 1985, the New York City Department of Transportation (NYCDOT) started a project to examine the causes of fatalities and injuries on the boulevard. The changing of traffic signals to increase crossing times across the boulevard helped reduce the average pedestrian deaths in a section in Forest Hills and Rego Park from 4 each year from 1980 and 1984 to 1 in 1986. In four of the five years between 1988 and 1992, as many people were killed in car accidents on the boulevard as on any other street in the city. Between 1991 and 1992, new speed limit signs were installed on the boulevard, police enforcement of traffic light and speeding violations was increased, and the timing for street lights was adjusted.

Up until 2005, the section of NY 25 that forms the border between New York City and Nassau County was simultaneously named Jamaica Avenue on the westbound (Queens, New York City) side and Jericho Turnpike on the eastbound (Nassau County) side. Some map makers only showed one of the names. The confusion ended where the road wholly entered Nassau County and thus became Jericho Turnpike in both directions. Similarly, both sides of the road west of Braddock Avenue (where NY 25 splits off to the northwest) were known as Jamaica Avenue even though the south side is still the Nassau County border until 225th Street. Legislation renaming the westbound side of NY 25 between Braddock Avenue and the Nassau County line as Jericho Turnpike was signed into law by New York City Mayor Michael Bloomberg on June 6, 2005, and took effect on September 4.

Many former segments of the roads NY 25 follows exist along the current alignment, with most prefaced by the word "Old" in the road name. Within Jericho, Old Jericho Turnpike parallels the current road from a point east of the NY 106–NY 107 interchange and Marian Lane, where the old alignment merges with the current NY 25. Smithtown contains a former segment in the vicinity of the Nissequogue River with a bridge and former right-of-way that still exists today. In Coram, an old alignment of Middle Country Road (NY 25) extends from east of Paul's Path to Grant Smith Road. The road, however, is discontinuous at NY 112. At Middle Island, a former segment of Middle Country Road exists east of Church Lane and north of Bartlett Pond and runs to Robin Drive in Middle Island, where it rejoins NY 25. Another former segment used to dip south to avoid a small lake to the north. A small segment of the road remains intact as Old Middle Country Road from Picaso Way to Woodville Road. Prior to the construction of Picaso Way and the cluster developments it leads to, this section of Old Middle Country Road connected to the existing section at its west end, the stub of which can still be found.

Near Riverhead, Middle Country Road once followed a parallel roadway to the south of the current roadway between River Road and Forge Road. Although some of this section has been dismantled, a portion still exists as modern Forge Road from the Peconic River Bridge to Kroemer Avenue. In Laurel, New York (Southold township), A quarter mile section was rerouted past the town hamlet of Laurel in a more direct and straight manner. The old section became Franklinville Road which connects to NY 25 at both ends of the 1/4 mile bypass. In Mattituck, an old alignment of Main Road (NY 25) exists as Old Main Road from Bray Avenue to west of Sigsbee Road. Southwest of Southold, Main Road originally followed the length of Lower Road and Ackerly Pond Lane between Lower Road and Main Road. To the northeast of the community, another former segment remains intact as Old Main Road between Budd's Pond and Mill Creek to Hashamomuck Pond.

East of Greenport, a former alignment of Main Road is located between the creek from Silver Lake and Silvermere Road. In Orient, two former routings of Main Road exist, both in the vicinity of Bight Road. The first, a loop connecting Grandview Drive to NY 25, is located west of Bight Road. The second, a loop providing access to Whalers Road from NY 25, is west of Charles Rose Airport.

In 2025, a bus lane was constructed on NY 25 (Hillside Avenue) around Jamaica, between 139th Street and Springfield Boulevard. These bus lanes, which are offset from the curb, replaced a set of curbside bus lanes that had been in place since 1969.

== Suffixed routes ==
NY 25 once had as many as four suffixed routes; two no longer exist.

- NY 25A (72.91 miles or 117.34 kilometres) is an alternate route of NY 25 across northern Long Island. The route begins at the Queens Midtown Tunnel in Queens and ends at NY 25 in Calverton. It was assigned c. 1927.
- NY 25B (7.25 miles or 11.67 kilometres) is an alternate route of NY 25 between eastern Queens and Mineola, Nassau County. The route was assigned c. 1935.
- NY 25C was a connector between NY 25 in the New York City borough of Queens and NY 25B in western Nassau County that utilized Union Turnpike and Marcus Avenue. It was assigned in the mid-1930s and removed in 1970.
- NY 25D was a connector between NY 25 in Queens and NY 25A in Nassau County. The route was assigned c. 1933 and removed in 1958.

== NY 25 Truck ==
New York State Route 25 Truck
- Location: Laurel–Greenport

There are two separate routes designated NY 25 Truck on the North Fork of Long Island. The longest of the two routes roughly parallels NY 25 along Franklinville Road, Aldrich Lane, Sound Avenue, and County Route 48 (CR 48) between Laurel and Greenport, while the other follows the north–south Moore's Lane between NY 25 and the east–west truck route just west of Greenport. Together, they bypass a low railroad bridge that carries the Main Line of the Long Island Rail Road over NY 25 in Laurel and narrow historic streets in Greenport.

The two routes were originally distinct highways that did not connect to one another. The truck route along Franklinville Road, Aldrich Lane, and Sound Avenue began as a route between Laurel and Mattituck, which followed Old Sound Avenue at its east end. The other NY 25 Truck began west of Greenport at the junction of NY 25 and Moore's Lane and followed Moore's Lane and CR 48 northeast to NY 25 north of the village. At some point, the section of CR 48 between Mattituck and Greenport was also posted as NY 25 Truck, effectively merging the two routes while retaining the north–south leg of the Greenport truck route along Moore's Lane.

== Major intersections ==
County	Location	mi	km	Destinations	Notes
Manhattan	Upper East Side	0.00	0.00	2nd Avenue / East 60th Street	Western terminus of Lower Level
Manhattan	Upper East Side	0.00	0.00	East 62nd Street / East 63rd Street to FDR Drive / 1st Avenue / 2nd Avenue	Western terminus of Upper Level
East River		0.48	0.77	Ed Koch Queensboro Bridge	
Queens	Long Island City	1.62	2.61	NY 25A (Northern Boulevard) – Roosevelt Island	Eastern terminus of Upper Level
Queens	Long Island City	1.62	2.61	NY 25A (Jackson Avenue / Northern Boulevard)	
Queens	Woodside	3.83	6.16	I-278 (Brooklyn-Queens Expressway) – RFK Bridge, Verrazano Bridge	No eastbound access to I-278 west; exits 39E-W on I-278
Queens	Rego Park	5.43	8.74	I-495 (Long Island Expressway) / Woodhaven Boulevard – Midtown Tunnel, Eastern Long Island	Exit 19 on I-495
Queens	Kew Gardens	7.99	12.86	Union Turnpike to Jackie Robinson Parkway	Interchange; no westbound access to Union Turnpike west
Queens	Kew Gardens	8.59	13.82	I-678 south (Van Wyck Expressway) – Kennedy Airport	Exit 9 on I-678
Queens	Hollis Hills	9.17	14.76	I-295 north (Clearview Expressway) / Grand Central Parkway / Hollis Court Boulevard (NY 24 east) – Throgs Neck Bridge	Southern terminus of I-295; exit 21 on Grand Central Parkway
Queens	Bellerose	13.37	21.52	NY 25B east (Hillside Avenue)	Western terminus of NY 25B
Queens–Nassau county line	Bellerose–Bellerose Terrace line	14.43	23.22	Cross Island Parkway – Verrazano Bridge, Whitestone Bridge	Exits 27E-W on Cross Island Parkway
Nassau	Old Westbury–Westbury village line	20.22– 20.27	32.54– 32.62	Northern State Parkway – New York, Hauppauge	Access via Glen Cove Road; exit 31 on Northern State Parkway
Nassau	Old Westbury–Westbury village line	20.76	33.41	NY 25B west – East Williston	Interchange; westbound exit and eastbound entrance; eastern terminus of NY 25B
Nassau	Old Westbury–Westbury village line	22.25	35.81	To Northern State Parkway	Access via Post Avenue
Nassau	Jericho	24.54	39.49	I-495 – New York, Riverhead	Exit 40 on I-495
Nassau	Jericho	25.40	40.88	NY 106 / NY 107 – Hicksville, Oyster Bay, Glen Cove	Cloverleaf interchange
Nassau	Syosset–Woodbury line	28.25	45.46	NY 135 south – Seaford	Northern terminus and exits 14E-W on NY 135
Suffolk	Huntington Station–South Huntington line	32.76	52.72	NY 110 – Walt Whitman House	
Suffolk	Elwood–Dix Hills line	35.44	57.04	CR 35 to Northern State Parkway	
Suffolk	Elwood–Dix Hills line	36.94	59.45	CR 66 south to Northern State Parkway	No westbound entrance; northern terminus of CR 66
Suffolk	Commack	39.24	63.15	CR 4 (Commack Road)	
Suffolk	Commack	39.58	63.70	NY 454 east – Hauppauge, Patchogue	No westbound exit; western terminus of NY 454
Suffolk	Commack	39.88	64.18	CR 14 north (Indian Head Road) / Sunken Meadow State Parkway – Bay Shore, Sunken Meadow State Park	No eastbound access to Parkway south; no westbound access to Parkway north; exits SM3E-W on Parkway
Suffolk	Community of Smithtown	43.80	70.49	NY 25A west	Western end of NY 25A concurrency
Suffolk	Smithtown–Village of the Branch line	45.15	72.66	NY 25A east / NY 111 south – Hauppauge, Stony Brook, Port Jefferson	Eastern end of NY 25A concurrency; northern terminus of NY 111
Suffolk	Village of the Branch	45.78	73.68	CR 16 east (Terry Road)	Western terminus of CR 16
Suffolk	Nesconset–St. James line	47.93	77.14	NY 347 – Hauppauge, Port Jefferson	
Suffolk	Centereach	51.92	83.56	CR 97 (Nicolls Road) – Stony Brook, Blue Point	SPUI
Suffolk	Coram	54.25	87.31	CR 83 – Patchogue, Mount Sinai	
Suffolk	Coram	55.10	88.67	NY 112 – Medford, Patchogue	
Suffolk	Middle Island	58.48	94.11	CR 21 (Rocky Point Road)	
Suffolk	Ridge	61.63	99.18	CR 46 – Wading River, Smith Point Park	Cloverleaf interchange
Suffolk	Wading River–Calverton line	66.85	107.58	NY 25A west – Wading River, Port Jefferson	Eastern terminus of NY 25A
Suffolk	Calverton	70.05	112.73	CR 58 east (Old Country Road) – Greenport, Orient	Interchange; western terminus of CR 58; westbound access via center median u-turn ramp
Suffolk	Calverton	70.57	113.57	I-495 west – New York	Exit 72 on I-495
Suffolk	Community of Riverhead	73.85	118.85	To NY 24 / CR 104 – Montauk	Access via Peconic Avenue
Suffolk	Community of Riverhead	75.55	121.59	CR 58 west (Old Country Road) to I-495 west	Eastern terminus of CR 58
Suffolk	Riverhead–Aquebogue line	75.95	122.23	CR 105 – Northville, Westhampton, Montauk	
Suffolk	Laurel	81.33	130.89	NY 25 Truck east (Franklinville Road) – Mattituck	Western terminus of NY 25 Truck
Suffolk	Greenport	85.82	138.11	NY 25 Truck east (Moores Lane) – Greenport West	Alternate routing of NY 25 Truck
Suffolk	Greenport	95.68	153.98	NY 114 south – Shelter Island	Northern terminus of NY 114
Suffolk	Greenport	96.82	155.82	NY 25 Truck west / CR 48 west – Mattituck	Eastern terminus of NY 25 Truck/CR 48
Suffolk	Orient Point	105.07	169.09	Orient Point Ferry Landing	Eastern terminus; ferries serve Fisher's Island and New London, CT
1.000 mi = 1.609 km; 1.000 km = 0.621 mi: Concurrency terminus; Incomplete access
