= North Patchogue, New York =

- Hamlet and census-designated place
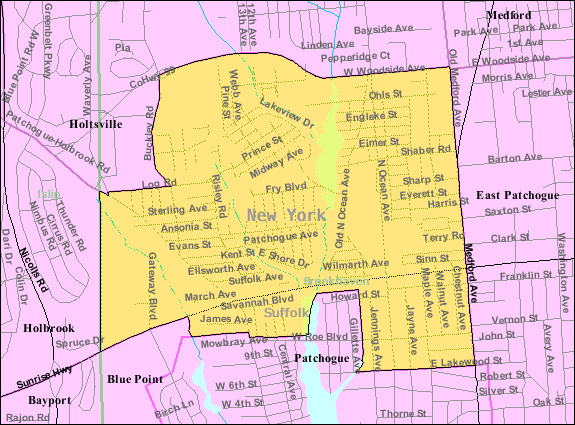
- U.S. Census map

- Location within New York
- Coordinates: 40°47′3″N 73°1′23″W
- Country: United States
- State: New York
- County: Suffolk
- Town: Brookhaven

Area
  - Total: 2.02 sq mi (5.24 km^{2})
  - Land: 1.97 sq mi (5.11 km^{2})
  - Water: 0.050 sq mi (0.13 km^{2})
- Elevation: 49 ft (15 m)

Population (2020)
  - Total: 6,751
  - Density: 3,421.7/sq mi (1,321.11/km^{2})
- Time zone: UTC−05:00 (Eastern Time Zone)
  - Summer (DST): UTC−04:00
- ZIP Code: 11772
- Area codes: 631, 934
- FIPS code: 36-53319
- GNIS feature ID: 0958869

North Patchogue (/ˈpætʃɒɡ/, PATCH-awg) is a hamlet and census-designated place (CDP) located within the Town of Brookhaven on Long Island, in Suffolk County, New York, United States. As of the 2020 census, North Patchogue had a population of 6,751.

== Geography ==
According to the United States Census Bureau, the CDP has a total area of 2.0 square miles (5.3 km^{2}), of which 2.0 square miles (5.1 km^{2}) is land and 0.04 square miles (0.1 km^{2}), or 2.57%, is water.

North Patchogue is near the interchange of NY-27 (Sunrise Highway), and NY-112 (Medford Avenue).

It is also the home of two waterways that flow into the Patchogue Lake and River, one of which is Canaan Lake.

Historical population
Census	Pop.	Note	%±
2020	6,751		—
U.S. Decennial Census

== Demographics of the CDP ==
=== 2020 census ===
As of the 2020 census, North Patchogue had a population of 6,751. The median age was 40.3 years. 20.3% of residents were under the age of 18 and 14.0% of residents were 65 years of age or older. For every 100 females there were 102.3 males, and for every 100 females age 18 and over there were 99.1 males age 18 and over.

100.0% of residents lived in urban areas, while 0.0% lived in rural areas.

There were 2,314 households in North Patchogue, of which 32.8% had children under the age of 18 living in them. Of all households, 54.6% were married-couple households, 15.7% were households with a male householder and no spouse or partner present, and 21.7% were households with a female householder and no spouse or partner present. About 19.2% of all households were made up of individuals and 6.9% had someone living alone who was 65 years of age or older.

There were 2,421 housing units, of which 4.4% were vacant. The homeowner vacancy rate was 1.8% and the rental vacancy rate was 3.7%.

Racial composition as of the 2020 census
Race	Number	Percent
White	4,804	71.2%
Black or African American	202	3.0%
American Indian and Alaska Native	25	0.4%
Asian	135	2.0%
Native Hawaiian and Other Pacific Islander	3	0.0%
Some other race	951	14.1%
Two or more races	631	9.3%
Hispanic or Latino (of any race)	1,792	26.5%

=== 2000 census ===
As of the 2000 census, there were 7,825 people, 2,694 households, and 1,988 families residing in the CDP. The population density was 3,669.7 inhabitants per square mile (1,416.9/km^{2}). There were 2,781 housing units at an average density of 1,304.2 per square mile (503.6/km^{2}). The racial makeup of the CDP was 93.30% White, 1.44% African American, 0.09% Native American, 1.11% Asian, 0.01% Pacific Islander, 2.38% from other races, and 1.66% from two or more races. Hispanic or Latino of any race were 8.77% of the population.

There were 2,694 households, out of which 35.8% had children under the age of 18 living with them, 58.1% were married couples living together, 11.2% had a female householder with no husband present, and 26.2% were non-families. 20.3% of all households were made up of individuals, and 5.9% had someone living alone who was 65 years of age or older. The average household size was 2.87 and the average family size was 3.32.

In the CDP, the population was spread out, with 26.5% under the age of 18, 7.4% from 18 to 24, 34.1% from 25 to 44, 23.4% from 45 to 64, and 8.7% who were 65 years of age or older. The median age was 35 years. For every 100 females, there were 98.2 males. For every 100 females age 18 and over, there were 95.0 males.

The median income for a household in the CDP was $61,145, and the median income for a family was $65,117. Males had a median income of $44,302 versus $31,724 for females. The per capita income for the CDP was $23,719. About 2.4% of families and 3.7% of the population were below the poverty threshold, including 4.9% of those under age 18 and 2.8% of those age 65 or over.

== Economy ==
The median income in North Patchogue is $103,854.

The Gateway Plaza is located in the CDP. It is an outdoor shopping center with over 30 stores. The daily traffic in the plaza reaches up to 80,000 vehicles per day. The plaza is located on Sunrise Highway.

== Education ==
North Patchogue is primarily served by the Patchogue-Medford Union Free School District, but a small western portion of the CDP is served by the Bayport-Blue Point Union Free School District.

== Notable people ==
- Michael P. Murphy, a United States Navy SEAL and North Patchogue native (1976); posthumously received the Medal of Honor in 2007 for bravery in action against the Taliban in Afghanistan in 2005.
