= New York State Route 27 =

Highway on Long Island, New York

New York State Route 27
- NY 27 highlighted in red, service roads NY 906C and NY 906D in blue, and former routings maintained as reference routes in pink

Route information
- Maintained by NYSDOT, NYCDOT and Suffolk County
- Length: 120.58 mi (194.05 km)
- Existed: mid-1920s–present

Major junctions
- West end: I-278 in Greenwood Heights
- Belt Parkway in Howard Beach; I-678 / NY 878 in South Ozone Park; Belt Parkway in Laurelton; Meadowbrook State Parkway in Freeport; Wantagh State Parkway in Wantagh; NY 135 in Seaford; NY 231 in North Babylon; Robert Moses Causeway in West Islip; Heckscher State Parkway at the Islip Terrace–East Islip line NY 24 in Hampton Bays
- East end: Montauk Point State Park in Montauk

Location
- Country: United States
- State: New York
- Counties: Kings, Queens, Nassau, Suffolk

Highway system
- New York Highways; Interstate; US; State; Reference; Parkways
← NY 26B	→ NY 27A

New York State Route 27 (NY 27) is a 120.58-mile-long (194.05 km) state highway that runs east–west from Interstate 278 (I-278) in the New York City borough of Brooklyn to Montauk Point State Park on Long Island, New York. Its two most prominent components are Sunrise Highway and Montauk Highway, the latter of which includes the Montauk Point State Parkway. NY 27 acts as the primary east–west highway on southern Long Island east of the interchange with the Heckscher State Parkway in Islip Terrace. The entire route in Suffolk, Nassau, and Queens counties were designated by the New York State Senate as the POW/MIA Memorial Highway. The highway gives access to every town on the South Shore. NY 27 is the easternmost state route in the state of New York, as well as the longest highway on Long Island.

Except for a short stretch in Great River, NY 27 has service roads that parallel the highway continuously from North Lindenhurst to Patchogue, and intermittently to the east into Southampton. They are officially designated, but not signed, as New York State Route 906C eastbound and New York State Route 906D westbound.

== Route description ==
=== Prospect Expressway and Linden Boulevard ===
NY 27 begins at exit 24 of I-278 (the Gowanus Expressway) in the borough of Brooklyn in New York City. For the first stretch through Brooklyn, NY 27 runs along the Prospect Expressway — a sunken six-lane freeway through the Park Slope and Windsor Terrace neighborhoods — providing interchanges with Fourth Avenue, Seventh Avenue, and 11th Avenue. At exit 5, eastbound NY 27 leaves the Prospect Expressway; the highway interchanges with Ocean and Fort Hamilton Parkways before ending a short distance to the south at exit 6 and Church Avenue. Eastbound NY 27 follows East 5th Street to Caton Avenue; westbound NY 27 leaves Caton Avenue at Coney Island Avenue, then follows Church Avenue to the Prospect Expressway.

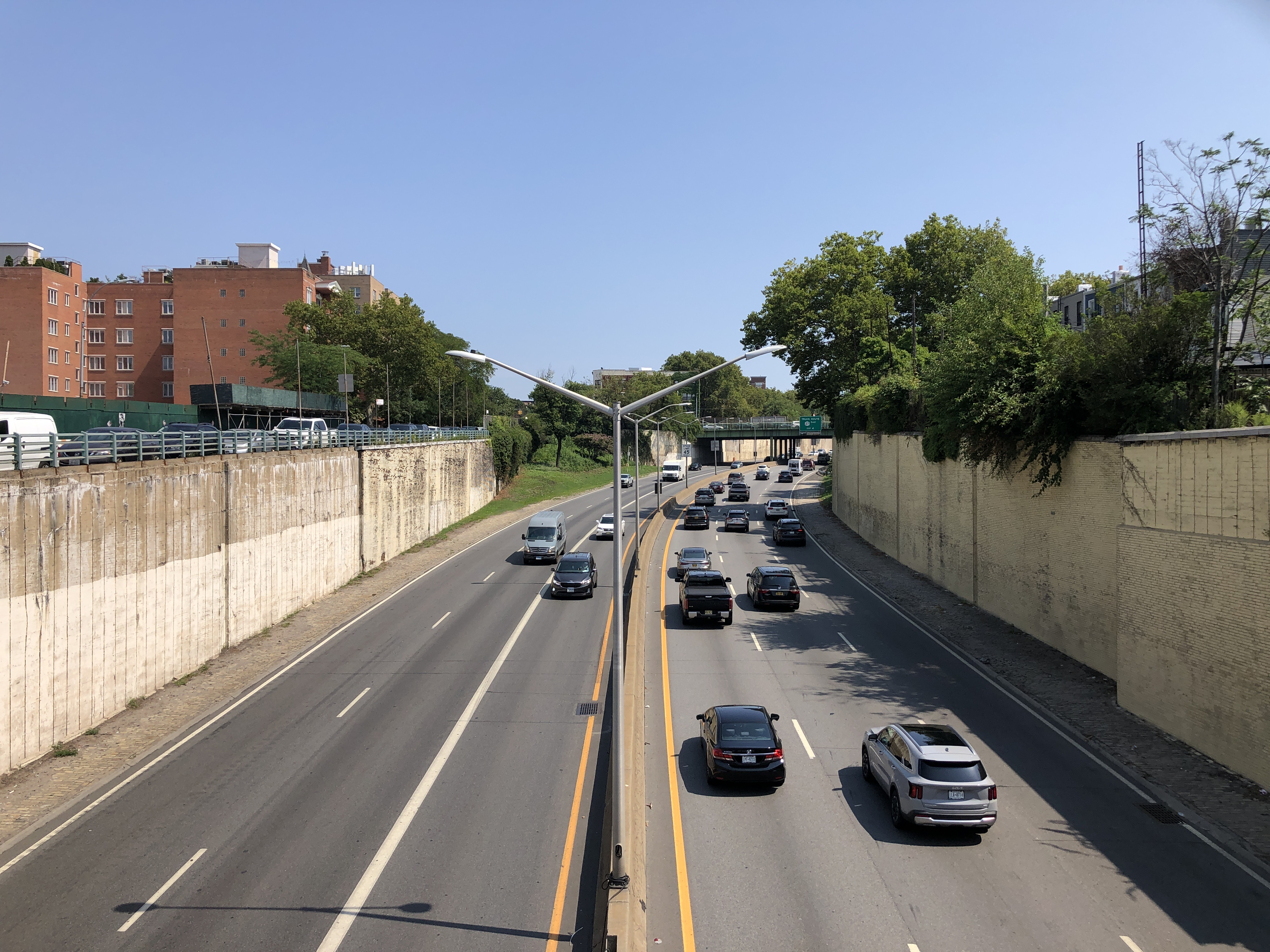
The Prospect Expressway as seen from 5th Avenue in Brooklyn

NY 27 runs along Caton Avenue near the south end of Prospect Park in Flatbush. A short distance east, the street merges into Linden Boulevard, crossing eastward through Brooklyn on Linden. NY 27 passes east through East Flatbush and reaches a large intersection with Kings Highway and Remsen Avenue, where it expands into a six-lane boulevard through Brooklyn with frontage roads. East of East 96th Street, NY 27 intersects Rockaway Parkway and then travels under the BMT Canarsie Line, winding through New Lots before turning northeast. After crossing under a nearby subway yard, the boulevard passes through the City Line neighborhood. Near the junction with Ruby Street, NY 27 enters the borough of Queens, but retains the Linden Boulevard name.

=== Conduit Avenue ===
Continuing northeast through Queens, NY 27 and Linden Boulevard enter Ozone Park and reach an interchange with Conduit Avenue, where Linden Boulevard ends. NY 27 then continues eastward along the divided Conduit Avenues. This portion of the route becomes a controlled access highway, coterminous with the western portion of Nassau Expressway (NY 878) starting at Cross Bay Boulevard until Aqueduct Road. (When constructed, the portion from Linden Boulevard until what is now Aqueduct Road, was designated Sunrise Highway. This is not to be confused with present Sunrise Highway, which is at the other end of Queens. Sunrise became Conduit at 111th Street, which no longer exists, but is approximately where Aqueduct Road currently crosses over Route 27.)

When the Nassau Expressway splits off, NY 27 continues east along Conduit Avenue and remains a frontage road for multiple exits of the Belt Parkway. The route interchanges with I-678 (the Van Wyck Expressway) a short distance later.

NY 27 remains a frontage road entering Springfield Gardens, crossing multiple exits of the Belt Parkway until entering Laurelton. In Laurelton, the Belt Parkway turns northward while NY 27 continues eastbound as South Conduit Avenue and westbound as Sunrise Highway, but stays a seven-lane divided boulevard (four eastbound and three westbound). The route crosses Francis Lewis Boulevard and south of the Rosedale Long Island Rail Road station; just east of Hook Creek Boulevard, NY 27 enters Nassau County and becomes the Sunrise Highway.

=== Sunrise Highway ===
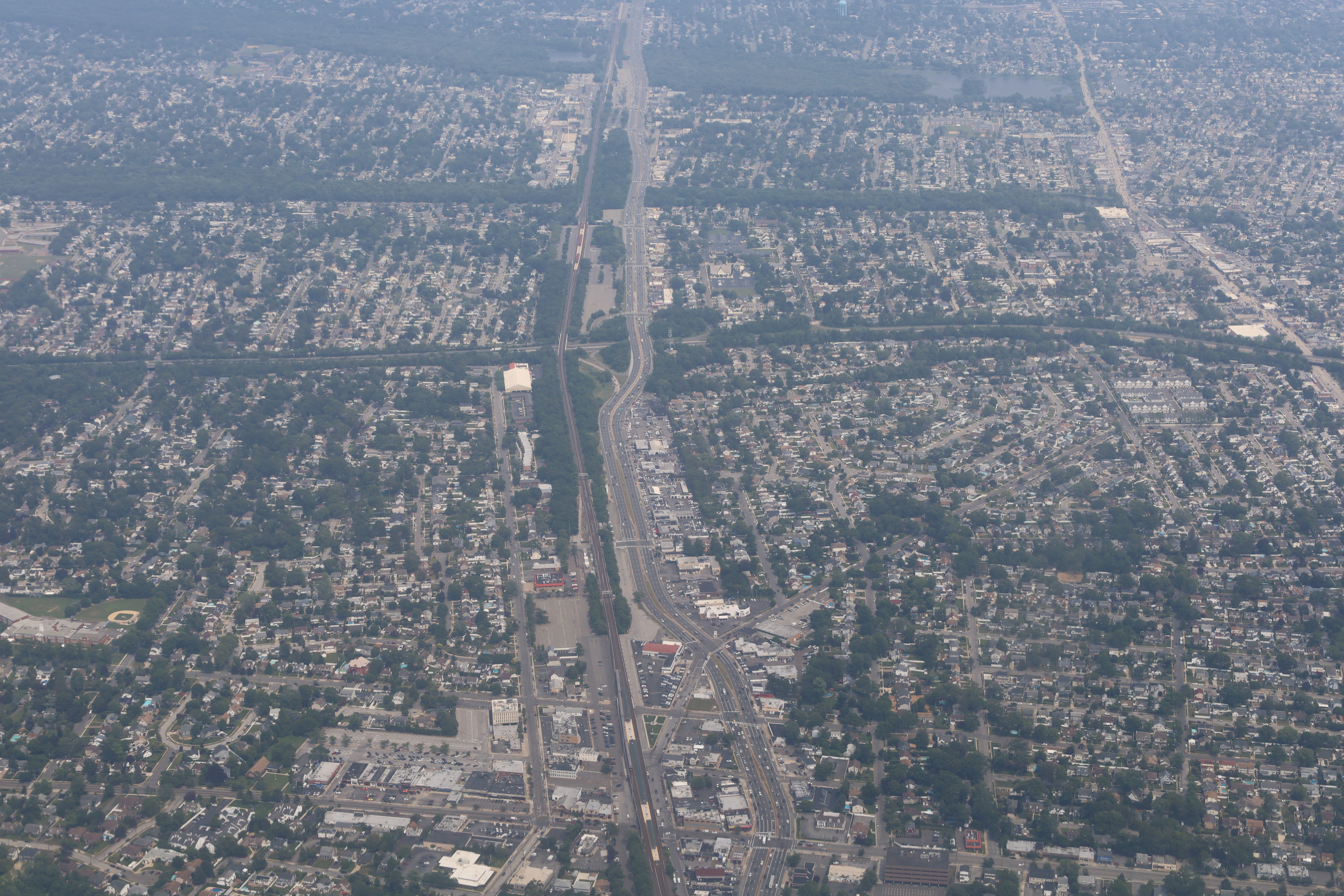
Aerial view eastward of Sunrise Highway in (from bottom) Wantagh, Seaford, and Massapequa in eastern Nassau County.

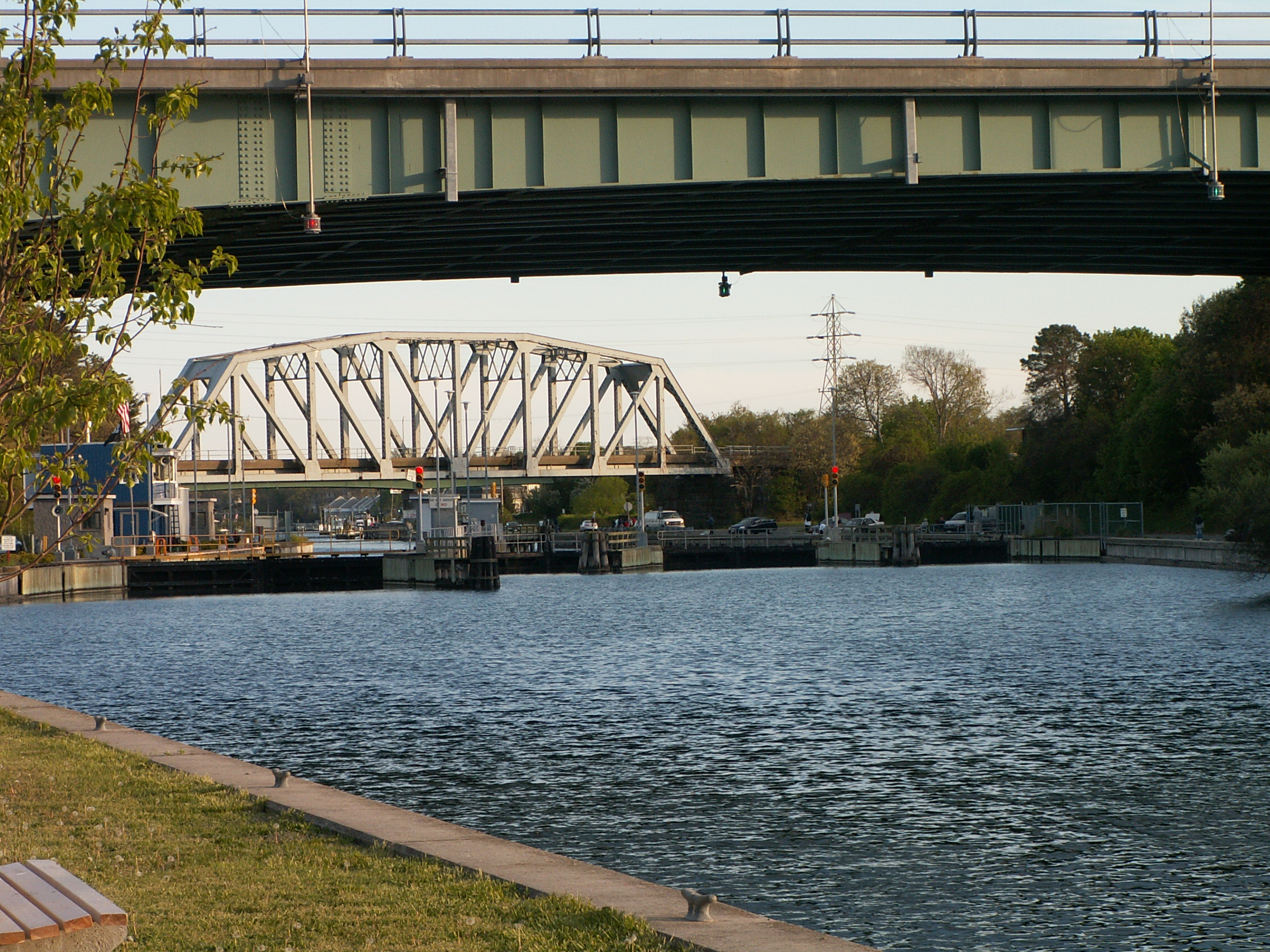
Sunrise Bridge over the Shinnecock Canal

Sunrise Highway begins as a six to eight-lane arterial road in eastern Queens, directly paralleling the Atlantic and Montauk branches of the Long Island Rail Road. It heads east into Nassau County, passing through Valley Stream, Lynbrook, and Rockville Centre on its way to Merrick. There it connects to the Meadowbrook State Parkway by way of an interchange. NY 27 continues to Wantagh, where it has an interchange with the Wantagh State Parkway. One mile (1.6 km) later, the highway has an interchange with NY 135 in Seaford. In East Massapequa, NY 27 passes under the LIRR and ends its stretch through Nassau.

NY 27 then enters Suffolk County, where it veers to the northeast, bypassing Copiague. At the interchange with NY 109 in West Babylon, Sunrise Highway becomes a six-lane freeway with a two-lane service road on either side. The route then meets the Robert Moses Causeway near West Islip. In East Patchogue, New York, the highway is reduced to a four-lane freeway after passing the NY 112 exit.

Between County Route 16 (CR 16) in Brookhaven and CR 46 in Shirley, the median is lined with pine trees along South Haven County Park. The setting along these roads is similar to the one on the Southern State Parkway west of Belmont Lake State Park. The last exit with a state highway is near Hampton Bays, where it meets NY 24.

East of NY 24, Sunrise Highway crosses over the Shinnecock Canal and has one last eastbound exit before merging with CR 39. It changes names to North Highway, a four-lane surface road more commonly known as Southampton Bypass. The highway continues east near toward village of Southampton before ending at an intersection with Montauk Highway. NY 27 turns east at that junction, following Montauk Highway toward Water Mill and points east.

=== Montauk Highway ===
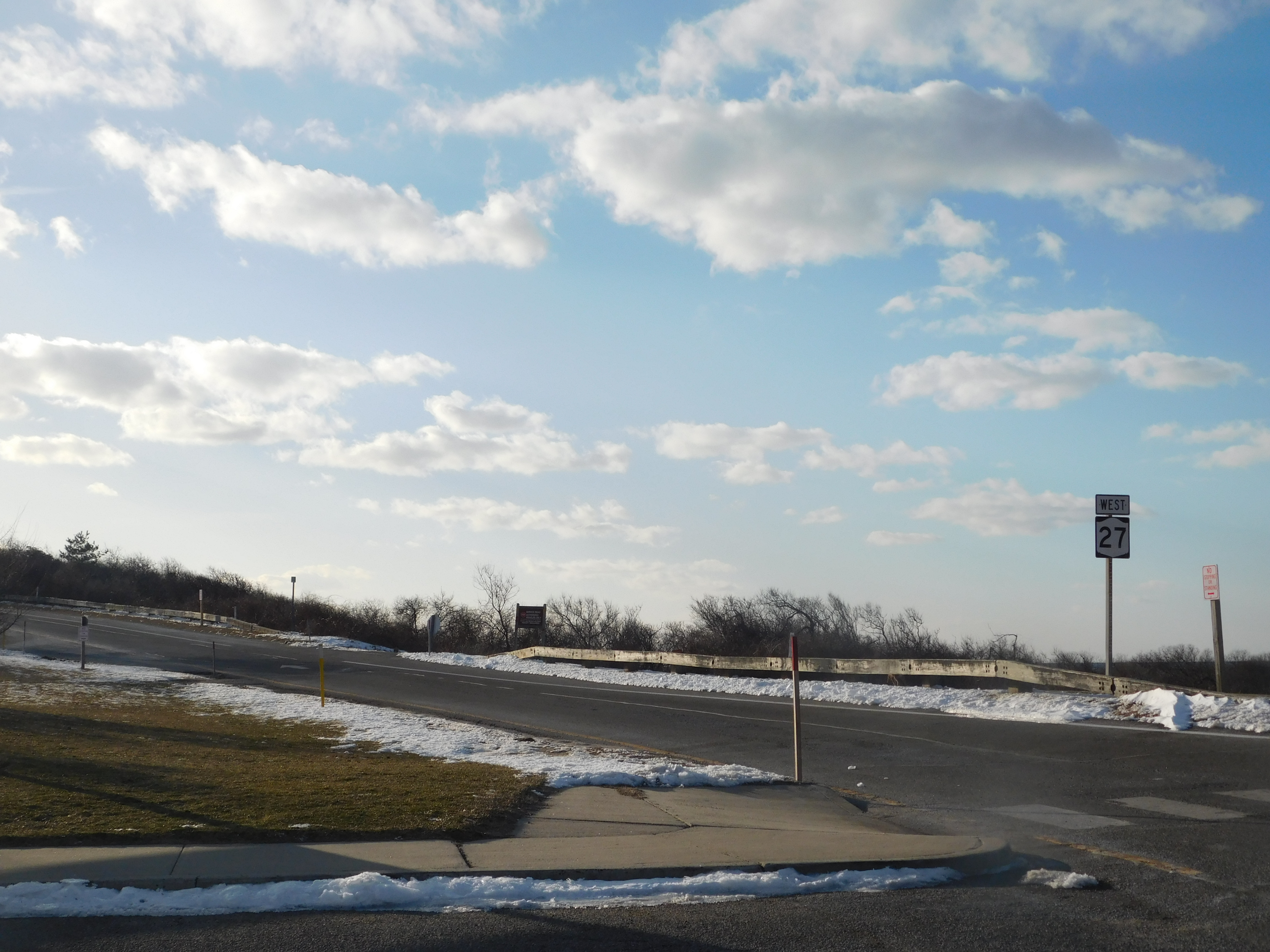
NY 27 in Montauk Point State Park

The section of Montauk Highway over which NY 27 runs is two lanes wide, with the exception of the four-lane sections in the village of East Hampton. This section of NY 27 is concurrent with New York State Bicycle Route 27. NY 27 heads generally northeastward to East Hampton village where it becomes Woods Lane, and later, Main Street. It has an intersection with the southern end of NY 114 before entering downtown. After passing Newtown Lane and North Main Street, NY 27's name changes to Pantigo Road, as it passes an eponymous historic district, listed on the National Register of Historic Places.

In the hamlet of Amagansett, NY 27's name changes back to Main Street, again returning to the Montauk Highway name. The road becomes Montauk Point State Parkway as it enters Hither Hills State Park in Napeague. The parkway, a Robert Moses-designed highway, carries NY 27 to its eastern terminus at Montauk Point State Park, on the east side of Montauk. The final 10 miles (16 kilometers) of NY 27 is known as Montauk Point State Parkway.

== History ==
=== Designation and since realignments ===
NY 27's designation was assigned in the mid-1920s to a road extending from the New York City line to Amagansett. It began at the point where Merrick Road exited Queens and entered Nassau County. It mostly followed Merrick Road and Montauk Highway east to Amagansett. From East Patchogue to Brookhaven, NY 27 followed South Country Road, passing through the downtown section of the village of Bellport.

In 1925, Congress passed a law that repaqured signage or be updated.

The NY 27 designation was extended eastward along Montauk Highway to Montauk Point in 1929.

On February 24, 1930, South Country Road was added to the Suffolk County highway system as CR 36. NY 27 was subsequently realigned to follow Montauk Highway between East Patchogue and Brookhaven.

NY 27 was realigned west of Great River c. 1931 to follow Sunrise Boulevard, a new highway parallel to Merrick Road, and then Montauk Highway, between the New York City line and Massapequa connecting several local roads from Massapequa to Montauk Highway at Great River. The former routing of NY 27 from Massapequa to Great River became NY 27A, connecting to NY 27 in Massapequa by way of County Line Road.

Sunrise Boulevard was extended eastward to Great River c. 1934 as a realignment of NY 27. One portion of NY 27's former route between NY 27A in Massapequa and the Suffolk County line is known as Old Sunrise Highway, and remains state-maintained to this day as NY 900D, an unsigned reference route.

In December 1934, the route was extended westward into New York City. NY 27 followed Sunrise Highway, Linden Boulevard, and Flatbush Avenue through Queens and Brooklyn to the Manhattan Bridge, where it continued into Manhattan along Canal Street to a terminus at 6th Avenue (then-U.S. Route 1A and later NY 1A).

On December 17, 1938, the Interchage with the Wantagh State Parkway was opened to traffic.

The Sunrise Highway was extended east of Amityville by 1940, it terminated at Montauk Highway's entrance to Connetquot River State Park. It was built over the Brooklyn Waterworks aqueduct, past the south side of Aqueduct Racetrack.

Shortly after the opening of the Belt Parkway system in 1940, Conduit Boulevard west of the parkway was expanded into a six-lane highway, with the right-of-way widened to create the grassy median. The project was undertaken in conjunction with the widening of Atlantic Avenue and grade separation of the LIRR Atlantic Branch.

The road was realigned slightly in 1941 to follow Atlantic and Washington Avenues, Eastern Parkway, Buffalo Avenue, and Rockaway Avenue between Flatbush Avenue and Linden Boulevard.

In 1953, Sunrise Highway was extended to East Patchogue; a 0.5 mi (0.80 km) overlap of NY 27 and NY 27A was created, with at-grade intersections connecting the highways. A segment of this alignment remains south of the eastern interchange.

Phyllis Drive was part of NY 27 until Sunrise Highway was extended to Eastport in 1957.

The prospect Expressway was competed in 1964.

NY 27 was altered in 1965 to continue west on Linden Boulevard, Caton Avenue, and Church Avenue to the south end of the Prospect Expressway. There, the route turned north, following the freeway to its end at the Gowanus Expressway (then-NY 27A), where NY 27A now ends.

Robert Moses developed plans for an elevated freeway featuring 10 to 12 lanes along Sunrise Highway through Nassau County in 1966. This freeway would have provided a truck link for the South Shore of Long Island but the downtown villages along the route effectively put a stop to the idea.

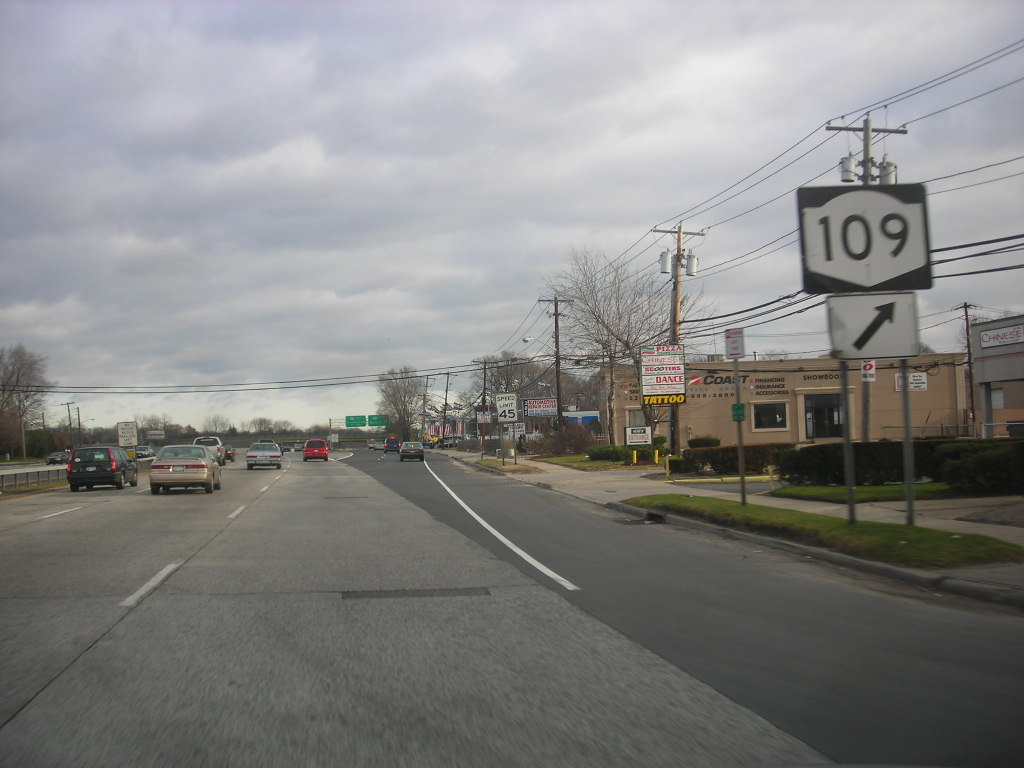
Sunrise Highway becomes a freeway at NY 109.

Prior to 1970, NY 27A continued north to Canal Street in Manhattan by way of the Gowanus Expressway, the Brooklyn–Battery Tunnel, and the West Side Elevated Highway. On January 1, 1970, NY 27A was truncated eastward to its current western terminus in Massapequa while NY 27 was extended northward along NY 27A's former route to Canal Street, where the Elevated Highway became NY 9A.

When the service roads were built in Western Islip Township between 1969 and 1971, parkway-style bridges were added for them as well. The interchanges at Fifth Ave and Brentwood Road in Bay Shore had parkway-style arch bridges and cloverleaves. When the service roads were added, the parkway-style bridges were demolished and new ultilitarian structures built in their place. The original cloverleaves were also rebuilt to align with the new service roads.

NY 27A was truncated east of the overlap in 1972.

The speed limit was lowered to 55 in 1973.

By 1974, NY 27 was cut back to its interchange with the Gowanus Expressway while I-478 was assigned to both the Battery Tunnel and all of the West Side Elevated Highway south of the Lincoln Tunnel.

Maple Avenue had crossed the median on NY 27 between North Ocean Avenue and NY 112 until 1975. This road could also have been used as a connecting ramp to both roads. Today, the north section only intersects the westbound service road, while the south section was converted into a dead-end street north of Austin Street. NY 112 was originally proposed to be accessible via connecting ramps to side streets such as Franklin Street along the eastbound lane and an extension of Sinn Street along the westbound lane.

The first proposals for an extension east of the Shinnecock Canal were made in the 1950s. In 1969, the New York Legislature approved a $160 million plan for the extension. It was a limited-access route, flanked by bicycle and equestrian trails. The eastbound and westbound roadways were to be separated by wide wooded medians. For the most part, the road was to run a mile or two north of existing NY 27, thus avoiding the populated centers through which it now passes. The extended Sunrise Highway would have had interchanges with CR 38 (North Sea Road) and CR 39 (County Road), CR 79 (Bridgehampton–Sag Harbor Road), NY 114 (East Hampton–Sag Harbor Turnpike), CR 40 (Three Mile Harbor Road), and CR 45 (Amagansett–Springs Road) before merging back into the existing Montauk Highway. The exits would have been sequentially numbered from 67 to 72. The plan failed, and Governor Hugh Carey canceled it in 1975. Other suggestions have included building a limited-access road on either side of Long Island Rail Road's Montauk Branch.

As with interchanges to the west, Islip Avenue (NY 111) and Carleton Avenue (CR 17) in Islip Terrace originally had parkway-style bridges crossing over Sunrise Highway. However, only Islip Ave had a partial cloverleaf on the west side of the bridge. The eastern side of the bridge used side streets for access, as did both sides of the Carleton Ave bridge. This section of Sunrise Highway wasn't divided. Since 1983, both areas have more modern bridges over the service roads, and the old cross streets connect to those service roads or other side roads instead. Islip Avenue connects to NY 27 at exit 45 while Carleton Avenue meets the Sunrise Highway at exit 46.

In the North Lindenhurst area, plans to construct a cloverleaf interchange with CR 2 (Straight Path) in Copiague have existed for some time. In recent years, planners have realized that such an interchange would be too close to the cloverleafs with CR 47 (Great Neck Road) to the west and CR 3 (Wellwood Road) to the east. To further complicate matters, a widened CR 28 was extended to Sunrise Highway near the Straight Path intersection in the late-1980s. To date, no interchange has been built for this area.

While none of the interchanges north of Patchogue were built until 1988 to 1993, the New York State Department of Transportation (NYSDOT) had known the need for them and had planned them decades before their eventual construction. As an example, Waverly Avenue (CR 19) was originally proposed as a cloverleaf interchange. Today, exit 52 with CR 19 is a diamond interchange instead.

The Oakdale Merge is a convergence of Sunrise Highway and Montauk Highway between Great River and Oakdale abutting the southern edge of Connetquot River State Park. The Montauk Highway predates the Sunrise Highway in the area. During the early-1960s, the Suffolk County Department of Public Works considered designating a county highway to connect Nicolls Road in Lake Grove through the Long Island MacArthur Airport, then on to the east end of the merge. As recently as 1981, the New York State Department of Transportation planned to add service roads and a proper interchange at both ends of the merge. Pressure from environmental groups seeking to avoid damaging the parkland stalled construction. NYSDOT eventually reconstructed Sunrise Highway in eastern Islip township into a freeway from 1994 to 1996, resulting in the present configuration.

In 1997, the entire length of Sunrise Highway in Queens, Nassau and Suffolk counties was designated as the POW-MIA Memorial Highway.

The freeway portion of Sunrise Highway between North Lindenhurst and Shinnecock Hills was completed in full in 1998. At the east end of NY 27 the highway abruptly became a three-lane highway east of the Shinnecock Canal, at the point where NY 27 is concurrent with CR 39. This area was known as the "Shinnecock Squeeze" as traffic on the two-lane eastbound NY 27 was "squeezed" into a single lane.

The entrance to Connetquot River Park remained as an at-grade intersection, accessible only from the westbound lane. Former segments of Montauk Highway now exist on both sides of the interchange, and sections of both roads were converted into fishing areas owned by the New York State Department of Environmental Conservation. Numerous accidents occurred at the east end of the merge, resulting in its reconstruction in 1999. A new off-ramp to the service road for Pond Road was built, resulting in renumbering of exit 47 to exit 46A.

In 2001, the NYSDOT installed a jersey barrier on the median between exit 39 and exit 44. .

In 2006, Southampton officials began using traffic cones to adjust the lanes to accommodate peak travel in what was called the "traffic cone program".

At the end of summer 2007, another eastbound lane was added, heading eastward to North Sea Road. The construction snarled traffic on CR 39. The Long Island Rail Road added three trains each way between Speonk and East Hampton during the construction.

In April 2008, the three-lane segment from North Sea Road to Flying Point Road was reconfigured from one eastbound and two westbound lanes to two eastbound and one westbound lane. The merge from two lanes to one in the eastbound direction is now assisted by a signalized intersection at Flying Point Road, where eastbound NY 27 traffic makes a left turn onto Montauk Highway. This widening project eliminates the "Shinnecock Squeeze."

==== Proposed interchanges and crossings ====
Besides the replacement of interchanges in Western Suffolk County, Sunrise Highway has had proposed interchanges and crossings that were either never built or were built according to alternate design specifications.

Sinn Street was acquired by NYSDOT east of NY 112 in the early-1960s, and was gradually abandoned. Today, exit 53 is a diamond interchange, and Sinn Street, Austin Street, and Franklin Street are now dead-end streets. Originally there were proposals to connect Washington Avenue and Phyllis Drive via ramps to side streets such as Franklin Street along the eastbound lane, and to an extension of Sinn Street along the westbound lane.

Some residents are asking for a potential pedestrian bridge connecting the two ends of Washington Avenue.

West of the Carmans River near Southaven County Park in South Haven, there was a plan to combine the eastbound service road with Montauk Highway, similar to the Oakdale Merge.

== NY 27A ==

NY 27A (17.31 miles or 27.86 kilometres) is an alternate route of NY 27 across southern Long Island from Massapequa Park to Great River, accessing Babylon and Islip. It was designated NY 27A c. 1931.

== Major intersections ==
County	Location	mi	km	Exit	Destinations	Notes
Brooklyn	Greenwood Heights	0.00	0.00	0	I-278 east (Brooklyn-Queens Expressway) to Hugh L. Carey Tunnel (I-478 Toll north) – Queens, Bronx, Manhattan	Western terminus; exit 24 on I-278; former NY 27A
Brooklyn	Greenwood Heights	0.01	0.016	1	Hamilton Avenue	Westbound exit only
Brooklyn	South Slope	0.24	0.39	2	3rd Avenue / 4th Avenue to I-278 west (Brooklyn-Queens Expressway) – Staten Island	Westbound exit and eastbound entrance
Brooklyn	South Slope	0.61	0.98	3	7th Avenue / 8th Avenue	Westbound exit and eastbound entrance
Brooklyn	Windsor Terrace	0.91	1.46	4	NY 27 Truck east (10th Avenue) / 11th Avenue	Eastbound exit and westbound entrance
Brooklyn	Windsor Terrace	1.45	2.33	5	NY 27 east / Fort Hamilton Parkway	NY 27 leaves the freeway eastbound
Brooklyn	Kensington	1.76	2.83	6	Church Avenue / Ocean Parkway – Coney Island	NY 27 joins the freeway westbound
Brooklyn	Kensington	1.76	2.83	Eastern end of freeway section		
Queens	Howard Beach				Conduit Avenue west to Atlantic Avenue	Interchange; no eastbound exit; site of formerly proposed Bushwick Expressway
Queens	Howard Beach			8	Cross Bay Boulevard – Riis Park	Interchange
Queens	Howard Beach	9.03	14.53		Belt Parkway – Verrazano Bridge, Eastern Long Island	Same-directional access only; no eastbound entrance; exit 17W on Belt Parkway; former NY 27A
Queens	South Ozone Park				NY 878 east (Nassau Expressway) to I-678 (Van Wyck Expressway) – Kennedy Airport	Interchange; eastbound exit and westbound entrance; western terminus of NY 878
Queens	South Ozone Park			11	Lefferts Boulevard – Aqueduct Racetrack, Long Term Parking	Eastbound interchange; westbound at-grade intersection
Queens	South Ozone Park	11.51	18.52		I-678 (Van Wyck Expressway) – Kennedy Airport, Whitestone Bridge, Bronx	No eastbound exit; exit 1 on I-678
Queens	South Ozone Park				150th Street – Kennedy Airport	Eastbound interchange; westbound at-grade intersection
Queens	South Ozone Park				JFK Expressway south – Kennedy Airport	Interchange; westbound exit and eastbound entrance; northern terminus of JFK Expressway
Queens	Laurelton	14.71	23.67		Belt Parkway – Verrazzano Bridge, Eastern Long Island	Same-directional access only; no eastbound exit; exits 23B-A on Belt Parkway
Nassau	Rockville Centre				Merrick Road	Interchange; same-directional access only; former NY 27A
Nassau	Freeport	23.89	38.45		Meadowbrook State Parkway – Mineola, Jones Beach	Exits M8E-W on Meadowbrook State Parkway
Nassau	Wantagh	26.73	43.02		Wantagh State Parkway – Westbury, Jones Beach	Exits W5E-W on Wantagh State Parkway
Nassau	Seaford	27.93	44.95		NY 135 north – Syosset	No eastbound entrance; exits 2E-W on NY 135
Nassau	Massapequa	28.83	46.40		NY 107 (Hicksville Road)	
Nassau	East Massapequa	31.04	49.95		NY 27A east (Old Sunrise Highway)	Western terminus of NY 27A
Suffolk	Amityville	32.07	51.61		NY 110 – Amityville, Huntington	Interchange
Suffolk	Copiague–North Amityville line	32.94	53.01		CR 47 (Great Neck Road) – Copiague, Farmingdale	Interchange
Suffolk	North Lindenhurst	34.17	54.99		CR 3 (Wellwood Avenue) – Lindenhurst, Melville	Interchange
Suffolk	North Lindenhurst–West Babylon line	35.32	56.84	Western end of freeway section		
Suffolk	North Lindenhurst–West Babylon line	35.32	56.84	37	NY 109 (Babylon-Farmingdale Road) – Babylon, Farmingdale	Exit number not signed eastbound
Suffolk	West Babylon	36.45	58.66	38	Little East Neck Road / Belmont Avenue	
Suffolk	West Babylon	36.93	59.43	39	Hubbards Path	
Suffolk	North Babylon–West Islip line	38.26	61.57	40	NY 231 (Babylon-Northport Expressway) – Babylon, Huntington	
Suffolk	West Islip–Bay Shore line	39.75	63.97	41	Robert Moses Causeway to Southern State Parkway – Robert Moses Park	Exits RM1E-W on Robert Moses Causeway
Suffolk	Brightwaters			42	Manor Lane	Westbound exit and eastbound entrance
Suffolk	Bay Shore	41.13	66.19	43	CR 13 (Fifth Avenue) – Bay Shore, Brentwood	
Suffolk	Bay Shore	42.40	68.24	44	Brentwood Road – Brentwood, Bay Shore	
Suffolk	Community of Islip	44.06	70.91	45	NY 111 (Islip Avenue) – Islip, Smithtown	
Suffolk	Islip Terrace–East Islip line			46	To CR 17 (Carleton Avenue) – East Islip	Eastbound exit and westbound entrance; access via local streets
Suffolk	Islip Terrace–East Islip line			46	Heckscher State Parkway / Connetquot Avenue – New York, Heckscher Park	Westbound exit and eastbound entrance; exit 44E on Heckscher State Parkway
Suffolk	Great River	47.41	76.30	46A	NY 27A west / CR 85 east (Montauk Highway) – Oakdale, Great River	Eastbound exit only; eastern terminus of NY 27A; western terminus of CR 85; former routing of NY 27
Suffolk	Oakdale–Bohemia line			47	Pond Road south	Eastbound exit only
Suffolk	Oakdale–Bohemia line			47A	Oakdale–Bohemia Road – Bohemia, Oakdale	Eastbound exit and westbound entrance
Suffolk	Oakdale–Bohemia– Sayville tripoint	50.16	80.72	48	Locust Avenue – Bohemia, Oakdale	
Suffolk	Sayville–Bohemia line	51.06	82.17	49	CR 93 (Lakeland Avenue) / Johnson Avenue – Ronkonkoma, Sayville, MacArthur Airport	No westbound access to Johnson Avenue
Suffolk	Sayville–Bohemia line			50A	Johnson Avenue – Sayville, Bohemia, MacArthur Airport	Westbound exit only; former CR 112
Suffolk	Sayville–Bohemia– Holbrook tripoint			50	Lincoln Avenue – Ronkonkoma, Sayville	No westbound entrance
Suffolk	Bayport–Holbrook line	52.44	84.39	51	NY 454 west / CR 97 (Nicolls Road) – Blue Point, Stony Brook, Commack, MacArthur Airport	No eastbound access to NY 454; eastern terminus of NY 454
Suffolk	North Patchogue	54.07	87.02	52	CR 19 (Waverly Avenue) – Holbrook, Patchogue	
Suffolk	North Patchogue	54.82	88.22	52A	CR 83 north (North Ocean Avenue) – Farmingville, Patchogue	Eastbound exit and westbound entrance; southern terminus of CR 83
Suffolk	North Patchogue–East Patchogue line	55.31	89.01	53	NY 112 – Port Jefferson, Patchogue	
Suffolk	East Patchogue	56.72	91.28	54	Hospital Road – Patchogue	Serves Long Island Community Hospital
Suffolk	East Patchogue–North Bellport line	57.48	92.51	55	CR 101 – Patchogue, Yaphank	
Suffolk	North Bellport	58.42	94.02	56	Station Road – Bellport, Yaphank	
Suffolk	Brookhaven–North Bellport– Yaphank tripoint	60.47	97.32	57	CR 16 west (Horseblock Road) / CR 21 (Yaphank Avenue) / CR 56 east – Brookhaven, Yaphank	Eastbound exit and westbound entrance; signed as exits 57S (south) and 57N (north/west); CR 56 not signed
Suffolk	Brookhaven–North Bellport– Yaphank tripoint	60.47	97.32	57	CR 16 (Horseblock Road) / CR 21 north (Yaphank Avenue) / CR 56 east – Brookhaven, Yaphank	Westbound exit and eastbound entrance; signed as exits 57S (CR 16 east) and 57N (north/west); CR 21/CR 56 not signed
Suffolk	Shirley	62.65	100.83	58	CR 46 (William Floyd Parkway) / CR 56 west – Shirley, Wading River	Signed as exits 58S (south) and 58N (north); CR 56 not signed
Suffolk	Center Moriches–Manorville line	66.35	106.78	59	Wading River Road – Wading River, Center Moriches	Former CR 25
Suffolk	Center Moriches–Manorville line	67.28	108.28	60	Railroad Avenue – Center Moriches, Manorville	Westbound exit and eastbound entrance
Suffolk	East Moriches–Manorville– Eastport tripoint	69.60	112.01	61	CR 51 – East Moriches, Riverhead, Eastport	No westbound exit
Suffolk	Eastport–Northampton line	70.96	114.20	62	CR 111 north – Manorville	Originally planned as a cloverleaf interchange with collector/distributor roads
Suffolk	Westhampton–Northampton– Flanders tripoint	75.47	121.46	63	CR 31 – Westhampton Beach, Riverhead	Signed as exits 63S (south) and 63N (north); serves Francis S. Gabreski Airport
Suffolk	East Quogue–Flanders line	76.95	123.84	64	CR 104 – Quogue, East Quogue, Riverhead	Signed as exits 64S (south) and 64N (north); former NY 113
Suffolk	Hampton Bays	81.15	130.60	65	NY 24 – Hampton Bays, Riverhead	Signed as exits 65S (south) and 65N (north)
Suffolk	Hampton Bays	82.94	133.48	66	North Road (CR 39) – Shinnecock Hills	Quarter-cloverleaf interchanges
Suffolk	Shinnecock Hills			67	North Road (CR 39 west) – Hampton Bays	Westbound exit only; western end of CR 39 concurrency
Suffolk	Shinnecock Hills			Eastern end of freeway section		
Suffolk	Tuckahoe				CR 52 north – North Sea, Sag Harbor	Southern terminus of CR 52
Suffolk	Village of Southampton				CR 38 north (North Sea Road) – North Sea, Southampton	Southern terminus of CR 38
Suffolk	Village of Southampton			CR 39 becomes CR 39A		
Suffolk	Village of Southampton	89.68	144.33		Montauk Highway / Flying Point Road – Southampton CR 39A ends	Eastern terminus of CR 39A
Suffolk	Bridgehampton				CR 79 north – Sag Harbor, Shelter Island	Southern terminus of CR 79
Suffolk	Village of East Hampton	100.17	161.21		NY 114 north – Sag Harbor, Shelter Island	Southern terminus of NY 114
Suffolk	Montauk	120.58	194.05		Montauk Point State Park	Eastern terminus
1.000 mi = 1.609 km; 1.000 km = 0.621 mi: Concurrency terminus; Incomplete access; Route transition
