= List of county routes in Suffolk County, New York =

County routes in Suffolk County, New York are maintained by the Suffolk County Department of Public Works (SCDPW) and signed with the Manual on Uniform Traffic Control Devices-standard yellow-on-blue pentagon route marker. The designations do not follow any fixed pattern. Some route numbers are deliberately omitted in order to alleviate confusion with New York state routes (such as CR 109 and CR 114); however, this practice is inconsistent, as other numbers including 108, 111, and 112 are duplicated. These routes are officially logged inside the New York State Department of Transportation's "Local Highway Inventory", which lists all county routes for each county in the State of New York.

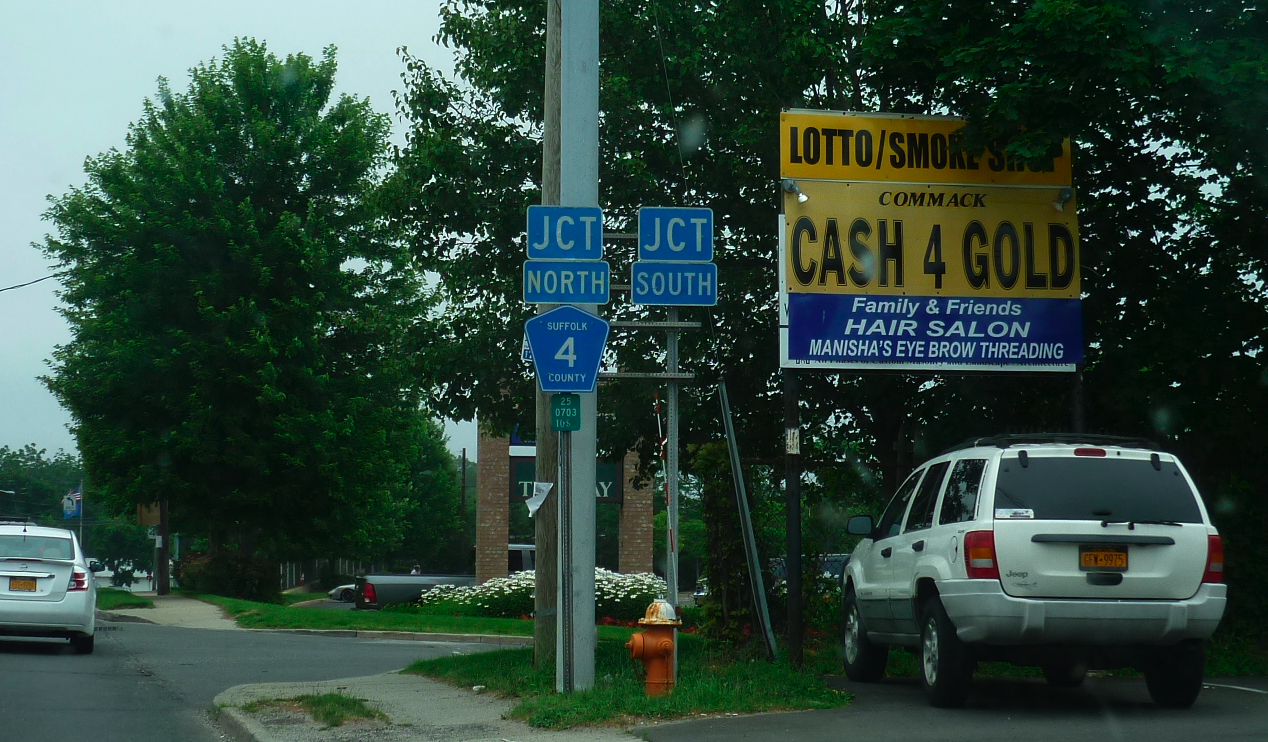
A Suffolk County Route 4 shield on New York State Route 25 eastbound in Commack, New York

== Routes 1–25 ==
Route	Length (mi)	Length (km)	From	Via	To	Notes
CR 1	1.54	2.48	NY 27A in Amityville	County Line Road	Joyce Avenue in East Farmingdale	
CR 2	8.53	13.73	NY 110 in Amityville	Dixon Avenue, Straight Path, & Seaman Neck Road	NY 231 in Half Hollow Hills	
CR 2A			NY 110 in Amityville	Dixon Avenue	NY 27 in Copiague	Former number; now part of CR 2
CR 3	6.84	11.01	Perry Street in North Lindenhurst	Wellwood Avenue and Pinelawn Road	Walt Whitman Road in Melville	Southern terminus is at the Lindenhurst village line.
CR 4	9.31	14.98	NY 231 in Deer Park	Commack Road & Townline Road	Clay Pitts Road in Commack	
CR 5	1.78	2.86	NY 110 in Melville	Ruland Road & Colonial Springs Road	Town of Huntington/Town of Babylon town line in Melville	Unsigned and unrecognized by the SCDPW
CR 6	0.86	1.38	CR 108	Rabro Drive in Hauppauge	NY 111	Serves Hauppauge Industrial Park and Suffolk County government buildings
CR 7	1.75	2.82	CR 13	Wicks Road in Brentwood	CR 67	
CR 8			I-495 / CR 101 in Yaphank	Yaphank Bypass	CR 21 in Middle Island	Unbuilt route
CR 9	4.65	7.48	NY 25A in Huntington	Greenlawn Road & Cuba Hill Road	CR 10 in Elwood	Unsigned and unrecognized by the SCDPW
CR 10	3.94	6.34	NY 25 in Elwood	Elwood Road	NY 25A in Northport	
CR 11	11.21	18.04	NY 108 in Cold Spring Harbor	Pulaski Road & East Northport Road	NY 25A in Kings Park	
CR 11A			CR 86 in Greenlawn	Pulaski Road	CR 10 in East Northport	Former number; now part of CR 11
CR 11B			NY 110 in Huntington Station	Pulaski Road	CR 86 in Greenlawn	Former number; now part of CR 11
CR 11C			NY 108 in Cold Spring Harbor	Pulaski Road	NY 110 in Huntington Station	Former number; now part of CR 11
CR 12	4.45	7.16	CR 1 in Amityville	Oak Street, Hoffman Avenue, & Railroad Avenue	CR 96 in West Babylon	Formerly CR 50B. Eastern terminus at Babylon village line.
CR 13	7.50	12.07	NY 27A in Bay Shore	Fifth Avenue and Crooked Hill Road	CR 4 in Commack	Segment between West Main Street (NY 27A) and Clinton Street (CR 13A) in Bay Shore is northbound only. Southbound only segment is Clinton Street (CR 13A).
CR 13A	0.65	1.05	CR 13	Clinton Avenue in Bay Shore	NY 27A	Southbound only segment of CR 13; formerly CR 53
CR 14	3.22	5.18	NY 25 in Commack	Indian Head Road	NY 25A in Kings Park	
CR 15	1.35	2.17	NY 111 in Hauppauge	Maple Avenue	NY 25 / NY 25A in Smithtown	Was unsigned and unrecognized by the SCDPW. No longer recognized by NYSDOT.
CR 16	15.90	25.59	NY 25 in Village of the Branch	Terry Road, Smithtown Boulevard, Lake Shore Road, Portion Road, and Horseblock Road	CR 80 in South Haven	
CR 17	5.53	8.90	NY 27A in East Islip	Carleton Avenue and Wheeler Road	NY 111 in Hauppauge	Former alignment of NY 111 before 1966
CR 18	3.90	6.28	CR 85 in Sayville	Broadway Avenue	CR 19 in Holbrook	Was unsigned and unrecognized by the SCDPW. No longer recognized by NYSDOT.
CR 19	6.77	10.90	CR 65 in Patchogue	West Avenue, Lake Street, Waverly Avenue, Patchogue–Holbrook Road, & Patchogue Road	CR 16 in Ronkonkoma	
CR 19A	0.9	1.45	CR 18	Main Street in Holbrook	CR 19	Former segment of CR 19 through Holbrook.
CR 20	6.60	10.62	NY 25A in Port Jefferson	North Country Road	NY 25A in Sound Beach	Once included Lower Sheep Pasture and Sheep Pasture roads; Was unsigned and unrecognized by the SCDPW. No longer recognized by NYSDOT.
CR 21	11.70	18.83	CR 80 in Brookhaven	Yaphank Avenue, Main Street, Yaphank–Middle Island Road, and Rocky Point Road	NY 25A in Rocky Point	Discontinuous at Sunrise Highway (NY 27) in Brookhaven.
CR 21A			CR 21 / CR 56	Horseblock Road Extension in Brookhaven	CR 80	Former number; now part of CR 16
CR 22	2.45	3.94	NY 25 in Jamesport	Manor Lane	Sound Avenue in Northville	Was unsigned and unrecognized by the SCDPW. No longer recognized by NYSDOT.
CR 23			NY 25 in Aquebogue	Church Lane	Sound Avenue in Northville	Was unsigned and unrecognized by the SCDPW. No longer recognized by NYSDOT.
CR 24			CR 21 in Middle Island	Longwood Road	CR 46 in Upton	Former number.
CR 25			CR 80 in Center Moriches	Railroad Avenue, Wading River-Center Moriches Road, North Country Road, Sound Road	Long Island Sound in Wading River	Former number; realigned section was planned between I-495 exit 69 and west end of CR 80 and CR 98

== Routes 26–50C ==
Route	Length (mi)	Length (km)	From	Via	To	Notes
CR 26			NY 25 in Mattituck	New Suffolk Lane and New Suffolk Road	NY 25 in Cutchogue	No longer recognized by SCDPW or NYSDOT.
CR 27			NY 25 Truck in Mattituck	Middle Road	NY 25 in Greenport	Former number; now part of CR 48
CR 27A			NY 25 Truck	Middle Road in Mattituck	Wickham Avenue	Former number; now part of CR 48
CR 27B			Wickham Avenue	New Middle Road in Mattituck	Wickham Avenue near Elijah's Lane	Former number; now part of CR 48
CR 28	2.31	3.72	NY 27 in North Lindenhurst	New Highway and Republic Road	CR 5 in Melville	Gap in route between Southern State Parkway and Babylon/Huntington town line.
CR 29			CR 93 in Bohemia	Smithtown Avenue and Ronkonkoma Avenue	I-495 in Ronkonkoma	Served as a connector from the Long Island Expressway to Ronkonkoma Station (LIRR) and Long Island MacArthur Airport. No longer recognized by SCDPW or NYSDOT.
CR 30			NY 27	East Lake Drive in Montauk	Block Island Sound	Served as a connector from New York State Route 27 to Montauk Airport. No longer recognized by SCDPW or NYSDOT.
CR 31	4.02	6.47	CR 80 in Westhampton Beach	Old Riverhead Road	CR 104 in Riverside	
CR 32	0.77	1.24	Dune Road	Ponquogue Bridge in Hampton Bays	Lighthouse Road	Serves Ponquogue Bridge over Shinnecock Bay. Unsigned route. Used to extend northward to Montauk Highway via Foster Avenue, Shinnecock Road, & Ponquogue Avenue.
CR 32A			Good Ground Road	Ponquogue Avenue in Hampton Bays	CR 80	Former number; was part of CR 32.
CR 32B			CR 89	Foster Avenue, Ponquogue Bridge in Hampton Bays	Lighthouse Road	Former number; was part of CR 32
CR 33			NY 27 in Amagansett	Cranberry Hole Road, Promised Land Road, Lazy Point Road	NY 27 in Napeague	Served Napeague. No longer recognized from SCDPW or NYSDOT.
CR 33A			CR 45 in Amagansett	Abrahams Landing Road	CR 32 in Napeague	Former number; was part of CR 74.
CR 34	1.34	2.16	Village Line Road Town of Babylon	Deer Park Avenue	NY 231 in Deer Park	Southern terminus is at the Babylon village line.
CR 35	7.04	11.33	Northern State Parkway / NY 231 / CR 66 in Dix Hills	Deer Park Road, Park Avenue, & West Shore Road	Landing Road in Huntington	Serves Gold Star Beach Park in Huntington.
CR 35A			NY 25A in Huntington	Park Avenue, Sabbath Day Path	NY 110 in Halesite	Former number; now part of CR 35
CR 35B			CR 35 in Dix Hills	Deer Park Road East	NY 25 in Elwood	Former number; now CR 66
CR 35C			NY 110 in Halesite	Mill Dam Road, West Shore Road	West Neck Road near Lloyd Harbor	Former number; became part of CR 35
CR 36	5.65	9.09	CR 80 in East Patchogue	South Country Road	CR 80 in Brookhaven	Former segment of Montauk Highway. Serves Bellport.
CR 37			NY 114	Manwaring Road in Shelter Island Heights	Shelter Island Sound	Former route.
CR 38	2.53	4.07	NY 27 / CR 39 / CR 39A in Southampton	North Sea Road	500 feet north of Millstone Brook Road in North Sea.	Serves the hamlet of North Sea. Used to extend from North Sea to Sag Harbor.
CR 38A			CR 38 in Noyack	Noyack–Long Beach Road	NY 114 in North Haven	Former number; now CR 60
CR 39	6.71	10.80	CR 80 in Shinnecock Hills	North Road & North Highway	NY 27 / CR 39A at David Whites Lane in Southampton	Most of the route overlaps with NY 27. Eastbound gap at Sunrise Highway terminus.
CR 39A	0.62	1.00	NY 27 / CR 39 at David Whites Lane	Flying Point Road in Southampton	NY 27 at Hampton Road and Montauk Highway	Entire length overlaps with NY 27. Signed as CR 39.
CR 39B	0.73	1.17	CR 39 / NY 27	Canal Road East and Old North Highway in Shinnecock Hills	CR 39 / NY 27	Former segment of CR 39 along Shinnecock Canal. Serves Meschutt Beach County Park.
CR 40	2.51	4.04	Cedar Street in East Hampton North	Three Mile Harbor Road	Copeces Lane in Springs	Southern terminus is on East Hampton village line.
CR 40A				Three Mile Harbor Road		Former number; now part of CR 40
CR 41	3.00	4.83	CR 40 in East Hampton North	Springs–Fireplace Road	Woodbine Drive in Springs	
CR 42	1.20	1.93	Rocky Point Avenue	Shore Road in Shelter Island Heights	CR 115	
CR 43	3.43	5.52	CR 73 in Riverhead	Northville Turnpike	Sound Avenue in Northville	
CR 44			NY 114 in North Haven	North Haven Spur	NY 114 in Shelter Island	Unbuilt route; was to include South Shelter Island Bridge
CR 45			NY 27 in Amagansett	Amagansett–Springs Road	CR 40 in Springs	No longer recognized by SCDPW or NYSDOT.
CR 46	15.37	24.74	CR 75 in Smith Point County Park	William Floyd Parkway	NY 25A in East Shoreham	Serves Smith Point County Park and Brookhaven National Laboratory. Was proposed to be an extension of Interstate 91 south from Connecticut in the 1970s.
CR 46A			Moriches–Middle Island Road in East Yaphank	William Floyd Parkway	South of NY 25 in Ridge	Former number; now part of CR 46
CR 47	3.77	6.07	NY 27A in Copiague	Great Neck Road & Main Street	Nassau County line in North Amityville	
CR 48	13.60	21.89	NY 25 Truck in Mattituck	Middle Road	NY 25 in Greenport	Entire length overlaps with NY 25 Truck. The western terminus is 1000 feet west of Cox Neck Road.
CR 49	2.84	4.57	NY 27	Edgemere Street and Flamingo Avenue in Montauk	CR 77	
CR 50	9.93	15.98	NY 109 in Babylon	Park Avenue, Deer Park Avenue, Simon Street, John Street, & Union Boulevard	NY 27A in Great River	Unsigned from NY 109 to CR 82 (Higbie Lane).
CR 50A			CR 85 in Oakdale	Union Boulevard Extension	CR 85 in Sayville	Formerly proposed eastern extension of CR 50
CR 50B			NY 110 in Amityville	Oak Street, Hoffman Avenue, and Trolley Line Road	CR 34 in Babylon	Former number; now CR 12
CR 50C			NY 109 in West Babylon	Park Avenue	CR 34 in Babylon	Formerly proposed western extension of CR 50

== Routes 51–75 ==
Route	Length (mi)	Length (km)	From	Via	To	Notes
CR 51	8.46	13.62	CR 80 in East Moriches	East Moriches–Riverhead Road & Center Drive South	NY 24 / CR 94 in Riverside	Serves Suffolk County Center - Riverhead.
CR 52	0.88	1.42	NY 27 / CR 39	Sandy Hollow Road in Tuckahoe	CR 38	
CR 53			NY 27A	Clinton Avenue in Bay Shore	CR 13	Former number; now CR 13A
CR 54	1.02	1.64	Sound Avenue	Hulse Landing Road in Wading River	Wildwood State Park	Once extended south to NY 25A.
CR 55	0.96	1.54	CR 80	Eastport–Manor Road in Eastport	CR 51	Originally extended northwest to I-495 exit 70. New signage implemented by NYSDOT on Interstate 495 at the Halsey Manor Road bridge shows a CR 55 shield for the road indicator signs.
CR 56	2.20	3.54	CR 16 in Brookhaven	Victory Avenue	CR 46 in Shirley	Serves Southaven County Park.
CR 57	4.54	7.31	NY 231 in Deer Park	Bay Shore Road, Howells Road, Roosevelt Street, and Third Avenue	CR 50 in Islip	
CR 57A			CR 57	Third Avenue in Bay Shore	NY 27A	Former number; now part of CR 57
CR 57B			CR 57	Third Avenue in Bay Shore	NY 27	Former number
CR 58	4.42	7.11	NY 25 in Riverhead	Old Country Road	NY 25 in Aquebogue	
CR 59	1.16	1.87	East Hampton village line	Long Lane in East Hampton North	Stephen Hands Path	Originally planned to run from NY 27 to NY 114 as a realignment of the latter.
CR 60	1.74	2.80	Noyack-Sag Harbor Road in Noyack	Noyack–Long Beach Road and Short Beach Road	NY 114 in North Haven	Formerly CR 38A
CR 61	0.32	0.51	CR 19	Waverly Avenue in Holtsville	CR 99 WB Exit Ramp	Route is unsigned. Serves Internal Revenue Service location in Holtsville.
CR 62	0.89	1.43	CR 80	Newtown Road in Canoe Place	Shinnecock Canal	Serves Shinnecock County Marina.
CR 63	1.84	2.96	CR 51 in Wildwood Lake	Lake Avenue & Peconic Avenue	NY 25 in Riverhead	Former segment of CR 51. Peconic Avenue portion unsigned from CR 94/CR 104/NY 24 to NY 25 (used to be a portion of NY 24).
CR 64			CR 36 in Bellport	Bellport Avenue and Station and Mill roads	NY 112 in Coram	No longer recognized by SCDPW or NYSDOT. Designation formerly used for Long Island Avenue between CR 101 and CR 21.
CR 65	4.78	7.69	CR 85 in Sayville	Middle Road, Atlantic Avenue, Weeks Street, River Avenue, and Division Street	CR 19 in Patchogue	
CR 66	0.92	1.48	CR 35 in Dix Hills	Deer Park Road East	NY 25 in Elwood	Formerly CR 35B
CR 67	14.43	23.22	Half Hollow Road in Huntington	Long Island Motor Parkway	CR 93 in Lake Ronkonkoma	Used to include Half Hollow Road in Dix Hills (CR 67A).
CR 67A			CR 3	Half Hollow Road in Dix Hills	NY 231	Former number; became part of CR 67 west of Long Island Motor Parkway.
CR 68			NY 25A in Stony Brook	Main Street, Christian Avenue, Bailey Hollow Road, and Ridgeway Avenue	NY 25A in Setauket	Ridgeway Avenue portion was once part of NY 25A. Route no longer recognized by SCDPW or NYSDOT.
CR 69	1.43	2.30	NY 114 in South Shelter Island	Cartwright Road	Ram Island Road in Shelter Island	
CR 70			NY 27 in Montauk	South Lake Drive	CR 77 in Montauk Lake	Former number.
CR 71	0.49	0.79	CR 80	Old Country Road in Eastport	Westhampton Beach village line in Southampton	
CR 71	0.53	0.85	CR 80 in Westhampton	Mill Road	Oneck Lane on the Westhampton Beach village line	Route is unsigned.
CR 72			CR 80	Atlantic Avenue in East Moriches	Moriches Bay	Former number
CR 73	1.27	2.04	NY 25	Roanoke Avenue in Riverhead	CR 58	Signs approaching the roundabout from Old Country Road (CR 58) to Roanoke Avenue (CR 73) say the route continues north from CR 58, but no CR 73 shields exist north of the roundabout.
CR 73A			CR 58 in Riverhead	Roanoke Avenue	Sound Avenue in Roanoke	Former number; was part of CR 73.
CR 74			NY 27 in Amagansett	Promised Land Road Extension	NY 27 in East Hampton Beach	Unbuilt route; was to replace much of CR 33
CR 75	0.50	0.80	CR 46 in Fire Island National Seashore	Fire Island Beach Road	Toll booth at Smith Point County Park	Formerly proposed segment of Ocean Parkway. Used to be signed, but all signs have been removed.

== Routes 76–100 ==
Route	Length (mi)	Length (km)	From	Via	To	Notes
CR 76	3.25	5.23	NY 347 in Hauppauge	Townline Road	Nichols Road in Nesconset	Runs along the Islip–Smithtown town line
CR 77	3.00	4.83	NY 27	West Lake Drive in Montauk	CR 49	Route loops back to intersect itself and CR 49 at northern terminus.
CR 77A			NY 27	Fern Street in Montauk	CR 77 / CR 77B	Former number; now part of CR 77
CR 77B			NY 27	Old West Lake Drive in Montauk	CR 77 / CR 77A	Former number
CR 78			NY 27 north of Bayport	Church Street and Kennedy Avenue	CR 80 in Patchogue	Originally included Veterans Memorial Highway (NY 454). No longer recognized by SCDPW or NYSDOT.
CR 79	3.73	6.00	NY 27 in Bridgehampton	Bridgehampton–Sag Harbor Turnpike	Brick Kiln Road in Sag Harbor	Route used to extend north to NY 114 in downtown Sag Harbor.
CR 79A			Sag Harbor village line	Main Street	Brick Kiln Road in Sag Harbor	Former number; now part of CR 79
CR 80	32.50	52.30	Patchogue village line at Bay Avenue	Montauk Highway	NY 900W at Knoll Road in Southampton	Formerly part of NY 27A
CR 81			NY 114	Wharf Street Extension in Sag Harbor	Sag Harbor Cove	Was the shortest county road in Suffolk County; former segment of the LIRR Sag Harbor Branch. No longer recognized by SCDPW or NYSDOT.
CR 82	1.62	2.61	NY 27A	Higbie Lane and Udall Road in West Islip	NY 27	
CR 83	11.53	18.56	Patchogue village line at Howard Avenue	North Ocean Avenue and Patchogue–Mount Sinai Road	NY 25A in Mount Sinai	
CR 83A			CR 83 extension in Miller Place	Cedar Beach Spur Parkway	Cedar Beach Town Park in Mount Sinai	Unbuilt route
CR 84			Sound Avenue in Mattituck	Cox Neck and Mill roads	NY 25 in East Mattituck	Former route.
CR 85	8.11	13.05	NY 27 in Oakdale	Montauk Highway	0.07 miles west of CR 19 in Patchogue	Formerly part of NY 27A
CR 86	3.85	6.20	NY 25 in South Huntington	Broadway Greenlawn and Centerport Road	NY 25A in Centerport	Was to be replaced by part of unbuilt CR 107. Route unsigned north of LIRR railroad tracks in Greenlawn
CR 87			NY 25 / NY 25A in Smithtown	Edgewood Avenue	NY 25A in Saint James	No longer recognized by SCDPW & NYSDOT.
CR 88			CR 71 in Speonk	Riverhead–Speonk Road	CR 51 near Wildwood Lake	No longer recognized by SCDPW & NYSDOT. Served Suffolk County Community College Eastern Campus in Northampton
CR 89	1.18	1.90	0.91 miles east of Westhampton Beach village line	Dune Road in Westhampton Beach	0.14 miles east of Jessup Lane	
CR 90	0.53	0.85	CR 97 southbound ramp	Furrows Road in Holtsville	Waverly Avenue	Part of formerly proposed Central Suffolk Highway, route is unsigned.
CR 91			I-495 exit 70 in Manorville	Manorville Branch Road	CR 71 / CR 80 in Eastport	Was to be built on former LIRR Manorville Branch
CR 92	2.89	4.65	NY 25 in West Hills	Oakwood Road and High Street	NY 110 in Huntington	
CR 93	5.48	8.82	NY 27 exit 49 in Sayville	Lakeland, Ocean, and Rosevale avenues	CR 16 in Lake Ronkokoma	
CR 94	4.58	7.37	River Road in Calverton	Edwards Avenue, Nugent Drive, & Center Drive	CR 63 / CR 104 in Riverhead	Overlaps NY 24 from I-495 to eastern terminus.
CR 94A	0.15	0.24	NY 24 / CR 94 in Riverside	Center Drive Spur	NY 25 in Riverhead	Shortest signed route in Suffolk County. Only signed on CR 94.
CR 95			NY 109 in West Babylon	Little East Neck and Colonial Spring roads	CR 3 in Melville	No longer recognized by SCDPW or NYSDOT.
CR 96	2.08	3.35	Great South Bay in Lindenhurst	Bergen Avenue and Great East Neck Road	NY 109 in West Babylon	Unsigned route.
CR 97	14.30	23.01	CR 85 near Blue Point	Nicolls Road	NY 25A in Stony Brook	
CR 98	3.07	4.94	CR 80 in Moriches	Frowein Road or Moriches Bypass	CR 80 in East Moriches	Formerly co-designated as NY 27A Truck
CR 99	6.45	10.38	CR 19 in Holtsville	Woodside Avenue	CR 16 in Brookhaven	
CR 100	4.80	7.72	CR 13 in Brentwood	Suffolk Avenue	NY 454 in Islandia	Was intended to be extended westward to NY 24 and NY 110 in East Farmingdale

== Routes 101 and up ==
Route	Length (mi)	Length (km)	From	Via	To	Notes
CR 101	5.23	8.42	CR 80 in East Patchogue	Sills Road & Patchogue–Yaphank Road	Long Island Avenue in Yaphank	Includes an unbuilt extension to CR 46 in Upton
CR 102			CR 21 in Yaphank	East Main Street Extension	I-495 exit 68 / CR 46 in East Yaphank	Unbuilt route
CR 103			CR 51	Cedar Swamp Road in Riverhead	CR 58 or I-495	Unbuilt route
CR 104	7.44	11.97	CR 80 in Quogue	Quogue-Riverhead Road & Riverleigh Avenue	NY 24 / CR 63 / CR 94 in Riverside	Formerly NY 113
CR 104A			CR 80 in East Quogue	Oakville and Lewis roads	CR 104 in Oakville	Former number
CR 105	5.30	8.53	CR 104 in Flanders	Cross River Drive	Sound Avenue in Northville	Includes an unbuilt western extension to CR 111 in Manorville
CR 106	0.47	0.76	CR 13	Community College Drive in Brentwood	CR 7	Originally a local road within the grounds of Pilgrim State Psychiatric Center. Route unsigned.
CR 107			CR 50C in West Babylon	West Babylon–Centerport Road	NY 25A in Centerport	Unbuilt route.
CR 108	0.24	0.39	CR 67	Old Willets Path in Hauppauge	CR 6	Unsigned route.
CR 110			CR 97 in Centereach	A.O. Smith Turnpike	NY 25A in Poquott	Unbuilt route; also intended to lead to a bridge between Port Jefferson and Bridgeport, Connecticut
CR 111	4.77	7.68	NY 27 in Eastport	Captain Daniel Roe Highway (Port Jefferson–Westhampton Road)	I-495 in Manorville	Originally intended to run from NY 25A in Mount Sinai to CR 89 in Westhampton Beach
CR 112	1.39	2.24	NY 27	Johnson Avenue in Bohemia	NY 454 at Long Island MacArthur Airport	Unsigned route; not to be confused with NY 112.
CR 113			NY 27 in Georgica	Stephen Hands Path	NY 114 in Hardscrabble	No longer recognized by SCDPW or NYSDOT. All signs have been removed.
CR 115	0.56	0.90	CR 42 in Shelter Island	West Neck Road	NY 114 in Shelter Island Heights	
CR 116	1.40	2.25	Midway Road	Smith Street & Menantic Road in Shelter Island	CR 115	
CR 117	0.45	0.72	Ram Island Road	Burns Avenue in Shelter Island	CR 69	

== See also ==
- County routes in New York
- Bicycle Path
- Old Country Road (covers the section not part of CR 58 or CR 71)
- Sheep Pasture Road
