= List of Suffolk County, New York road proposals =

Throughout the 20th century, Suffolk County, New York, planned to upgrade and improve many of its roads. Most of the construction of these roads took place between the 1940s and 1980s. However, many of them were unfinished, unbuilt or never upgraded due to fiscal concerns and a rash of anti-highway opposition in the late 20th century. Those that were unbuilt or unfinished are listed as follows.

== County roads ==
- County Route 2 (CR 2) was proposed to be extended as part of a lengthening of Straight Path (named Straight Path Extension) northeast of New York State Route 231 (NY 231). The terminus was either to be at CR 4 (Commack Road) at the north end of the multiplex with the proposed Babylon–Northport Expressway or would merge with Carll's Straight Path just south of the Long Island Expressway, then terminate at Long Island Motor Parkway with another potential unorthodox interchange with the Babylon–Northport Expressway.
- CR 8 (Yaphank Bypass) was to be a new four-lane road beginning at the vicinity of exit 66 of the Long Island Expressway, running west of the Carman's River and terminating at CR 21 near Bayliss (Bailey) Road.
- CR 24 (formerly Longwood Road) was planned as the Farmingville–Upton Turnpike, along Granny Road, Ashton Road, part of East Bartlett Road and Longwood Road, which was previously known as "South Manor Road."
- CR 25 (not to be confused with NY 25), formerly Wading River–Center Moriches Road, was planned to be widened and realigned west of the existing Wading River–Center Moriches Road between the Long Island Expressway's exit 69, then run south towards Moriches–Middle Island Road west of exit 59 on NY 27 (Sunrise Highway), where it would continue south towards Montauk Highway at the western terminus of the Moriches Bypass (CR 98). The project was never built, and the CR 25 designation eventually faded into oblivion.
- CR 26 (North Brookhaven Expressway) was planned as an eastern extension of NY 347 (Nesconset–Port Jefferson Highway). It is currently a pair of unsigned roads on the North Fork.
- CR 38 (North Sea Road) was proposed as a four-lane highway running along the shore of the Great Peconic Bay, Little Peconic Bay, Shelter Island Sound, Gardiner's Bay, and Napeague Bay. The extension was to be known as the Sag Harbor–Promised Land Road. This proposal dates as far back as the 1930s and continued to show up on maps well into the 1980s.
- CR 39 (North Road in Shinnecock Hills, Hampton Bays–Amagansett Road) was planned as an extension of North Road between Flying Point and the Sunrise Highway extension east of CR 79 (Bridgehampton–Sag Harbor Road).
- CR 44 (North Haven Spur) was planned as a realigned section of NY 114 leading to a bridge to Shelter Island.
- Although CR 48 (Middle Road) was planned to be upgraded as part of an extension of the Long Island Expressway leading to a bridge to either Old Saybrook, Connecticut or Watch Hill, Rhode Island, an additional westward extension of CR 48 at least to CR 105 was proposed in anticipation of construction of the proposed Jamesport Nuclear Power Plant. Both the nuclear plant and the road were cancelled due to public opposition, however, Sound Avenue is still listed on the books as being part of CR 48 between Cross River Drive and Middle Road by Suffolk County, despite the fact that signs indicate that the road is the western terminus of CR 48.
- CR 50A and CR 50C (Union Boulevard Extensions) were two proposed extensions of CR 50 west of Babylon and east of Great River. The eastern extension was intended to run between Oakdale and Sayville. Like the existing CR 50, it was to run along the Montauk Branch of the Long Island Rail Road. The western extension was to run between NY 109 in West Babylon and CR 34 in Babylon, along Park Avenue. Both were to be redesignated as CR 50.
- CR 55 (Eastport–Manor Road Extension) was a proposed extension of Eastport–Manor Road north of CR 111 (Port Jefferson Westhampton Beach Highway) into the grounds of the Grumman Calverton Naval Air Weapons Research Facility. The road was to include an interchange with the Long Island Expressway, which was more than likely to be named exit 70A.
- CR 59 (Long Lane) was planned as a realigned section of NY 114 outside of the East Hampton Historic District.
- CR 74 (Promised Land Road Extension) was a proposed western extension of CR 33 to Abrams Landing Road terminating at Montauk Highway near CR 45 (Springs–Amagansett Road). It is currently the unmarked Abrams Landing Road (former CR 33A) in Amagansett.
- CR 75 (Fire Island Beach Road) is an existing four-lane highway at Smith Point County Park that was planned as an extension of Ocean Parkway.
- CR 83 and CR 83A (Patchogue–Mt. Sinai Road and Cedar Beach Spur) was a planned extension of Patchogue–Mount Sinai Road that was to begin north of NY 25A then east through Miller Place to Sound Beach, with an extension to Cedar Beach Town Park in Mount Sinai. In addition, there was a proposed extension south of NY 27 into the village of Patchogue, possibly as far south as the Great South Bay.
- CR 90 (Furrows Road and Peconic Avenue) was planned as the Central Suffolk Highway, the second part of a proposed reconnection of the two segments of NY 24.
- CR 91 (Manorville Branch Road) was a proposed highway that was to run along the former Manorville Branch of the Long Island Rail Road, that connected the Main Branch in Manorville and Montauk Branch in Eastport.
- CR 94 (Nugent Drive Extension) was to be a northwest extension of existing CR 94, replacing part of Edwards Avenue, then break away from it north of the Main Line of the Long Island Rail Road. The road was to have interchanges with NY 25 and CR 54 (Hulse Landing Road). West of there, it would then replace part of Sound Avenue until terminating at NY 25A.

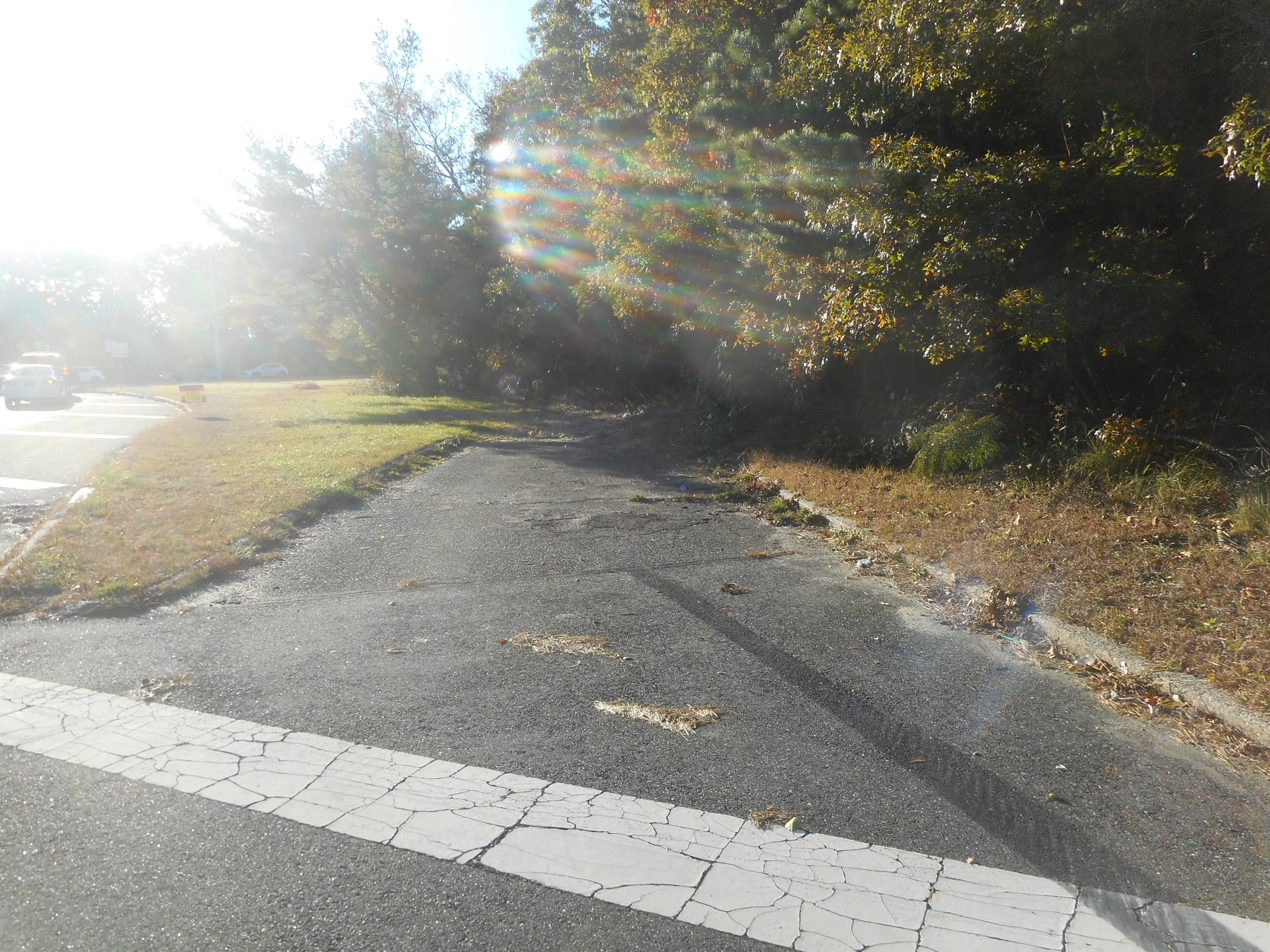
Stub ramp at westbound CR 99 and CR 19 in Holtsville, New York. This was to become the new west-to-north ramp while the existing ramp is converted into thru lanes.

- CR 99 (Woodside Avenue), along with some additional interchanges, was supposed to be extended east of CR 16 terminating at an interchange with CR 21, and west of CR 19 terminating at either Nicolls Road or NY 454.
- CR 100 (Suffolk Avenue) was planned as a Central Suffolk Highway, part of a proposed reconnection of the two segments of NY 24. Only the portion between CR 13 and NY 454 exists to this day.
- CR 101 (Sills Road Extension) was to be given to two extensions north of exit 66 on the Long Island Expressway. One of the two extensions would lead northeast to CR 46 (William Floyd Parkway). The first of which was to begin at the northeast corner of Patchogue–Yaphank Road & Long Island Avenue (north side of the L.I.E.), which would then cross over Gerard Road, Lower Yaphank Lake, CR 21 (East Main Street), and then continue northeastward to just south of the intersection of William Floyd Parkway and Longwood Road. The second would follow the existing Patchogue–Yaphank Road into "downtown" Yaphank, eliminating the two triangle intersections with Mill Road, then East & West Main Street, then heading eastward toward the aforementioned route to CR 46 and Longwood Road. Another proposal would lead it to the north side of the former Parr Meadows race track.
- CR 102 (East Main Street Extension) was a proposed upgrade on East Main Street in Yaphank east of CR 21, with a realignment to exit 68 on the Long Island Expressway and William Floyd Parkway.
- CR 103 (Cedar Swamp Road) was a proposed connector in Riverhead. The road would have begun at CR 51 and headed northward along the western edge of Cranberry Bog County Park. It would cross Nugent Drive (NY 24 and CR 94) and the Peconic River before turning to the northeast and ending at either CR 58 (old Country Road) east of Osborn Avenue or at the formerly proposed North Fork extension of the Long Island Expressway.
- CR 105 (Cross River Drive and Hot Water Street) was a proposed western extension of existing CR 105 between CR 104 south of Flanders and CR 111 near Manorville. This was to be the third link in the formerly proposed Central Suffolk Highway project.
- CR 107 (West Babylon–Centerport Highway) was planned to replace Cadman Road, Hubbard's Path, part of Belmont Avenue, and most of CR 86 (Broadway–Greenlawn Road).
- CR 108 (Old Willet's Path) was also to include Plymouth Boulevard, and most of Old Northport Road, and terminate at CR 11 west of the railroad bridge over the Port Jefferson Branch of the Long Island Rail Road.

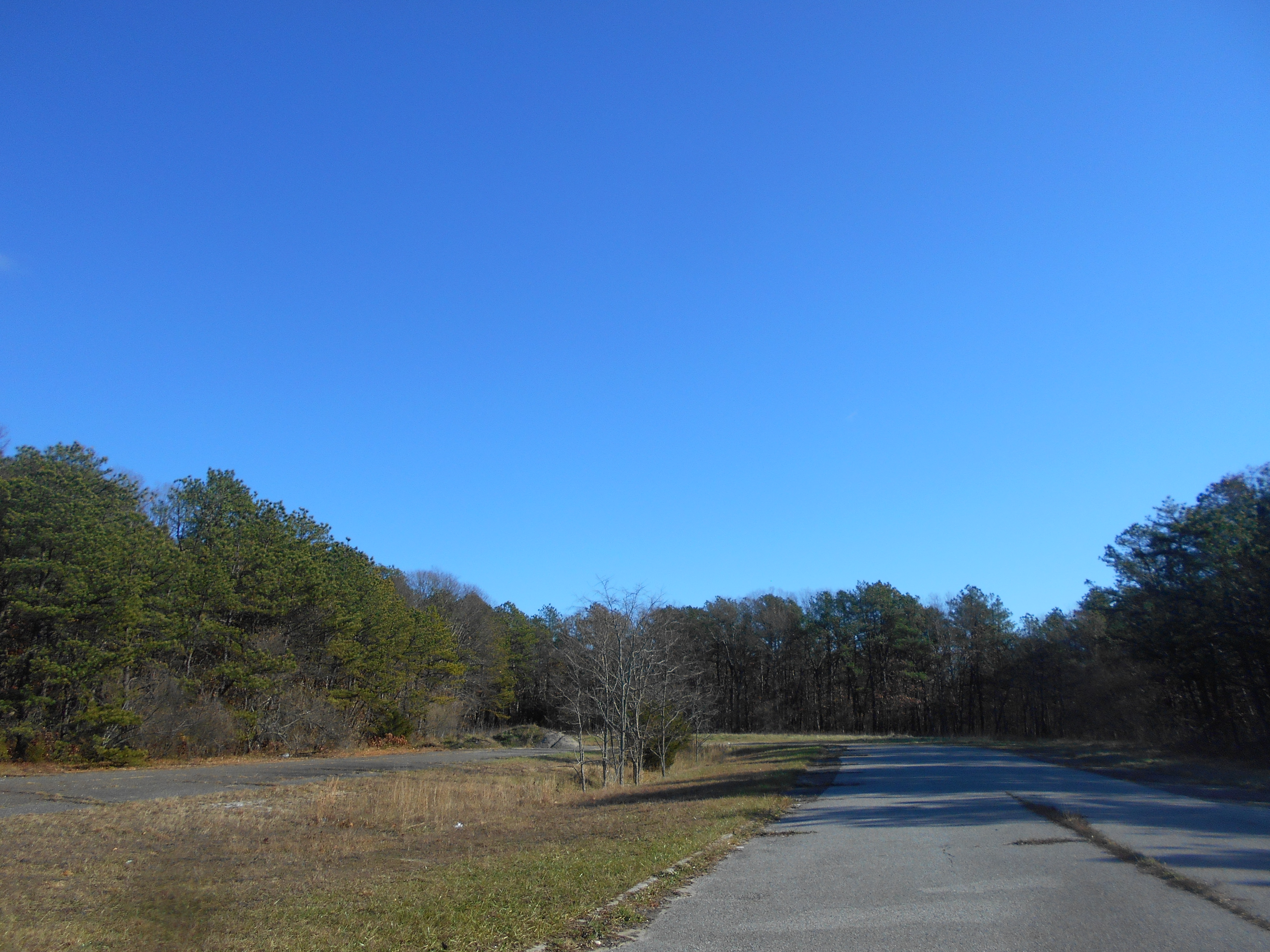
Abandoned stub at a frontage road for NY 27 for a CR 111 extension to Westhampton Beach

- CR 110 (A.O. Smith Turnpike) was to begin at CR 97, replacing Wireless Road, then continue north of NY 347 running into Poquott, and a possible bridge to Bridgeport, Connecticut.
- CR 111 (Port Jefferson–Westhampton Beach Highway) was to be a direct route from the north shore to the Hamptons. Only a portion of the road was built between Manorville and near Eastport. The road essentially became merely a four-lane version of Eastport–Manorville Road, the original two-lane road it replaced.

== Other roads ==
- While the upgrading of NY 27 (Sunrise Highway) was delayed near Patchogue, there were occasional rumors of an effort to upgrade Roe Boulevard West, Roe Boulevard East, Vernon Avenue and Washington Place as a four-lane highway in order to take up the slack. As Sunrise Highway was finally upgraded between 1988 and 1993, the proposal to widen these roads was scrapped.
