= County Route 104 (Suffolk County, New York) =

County road in Suffolk County, New York, US

County Route 104
- CR 104 highlighted in red

Route information
- Maintained by SCDPW
- Length: 7.45 mi (11.99 km)
- Existed: March 29, 1972–present

Major junctions
- South end: CR 80 in Quogue
- NY 27 in East Quogue
- North end: NY 24 / CR 63 / CR 94 in Riverside

Location
- Country: United States
- State: New York
- County: Suffolk

Highway system
- County routes in New York; County Routes in Suffolk County
← NY 112	NY 113	→ NY 113

County Route 104 (CR 104) is a 7.45-mile-long (11.99 km) county road in Suffolk County, New York, in the United States. It runs north from CR 80 in Quogue to New York State Route 24 (NY 24), CR 63 and CR 94 in Riverside. Much of CR 104 runs through the David Allen Sarnoff Pine Barrens Preserve, a major New York State Conservation Area that was once owned by Radio Corporation of America. There is an access point into the preserve along CR 104 south of Riverhead.

From 1930 to 1972, the road was signed as New York State Route 113.

== Route description ==
CR 104 begins at an intersection with CR 80 (Montauk Highway) in the village of Quogue. The route heads to the northwest as Quogue–Riverhead Road, a two-lane residential road with a 40-mile-per-hour (64 km/h) speed limit. After the junction with Scrub Oak Road, CR 104 passes the dead end of Station Road and crosses under the Long Island Rail Road's Montauk Branch, passing a large industrial area north of the tracks. Intersecting with Old Country Road, CR 104 bends northward and returns to a more residential area. Exiting the village of Quogue, the speed limit increases to 45 miles per hour (72 km/h) and the road enters East Quogue, passing some farms and a junction with Lewis Road. The route curves to the northwest and the speed limit increases once again to 50 miles per hour (80 km/h) before entering interchanges 64N-S of the Sunrise Highway (NY 27). CR 104 expands to four lanes for a short distance, merging back to two after the interchange.

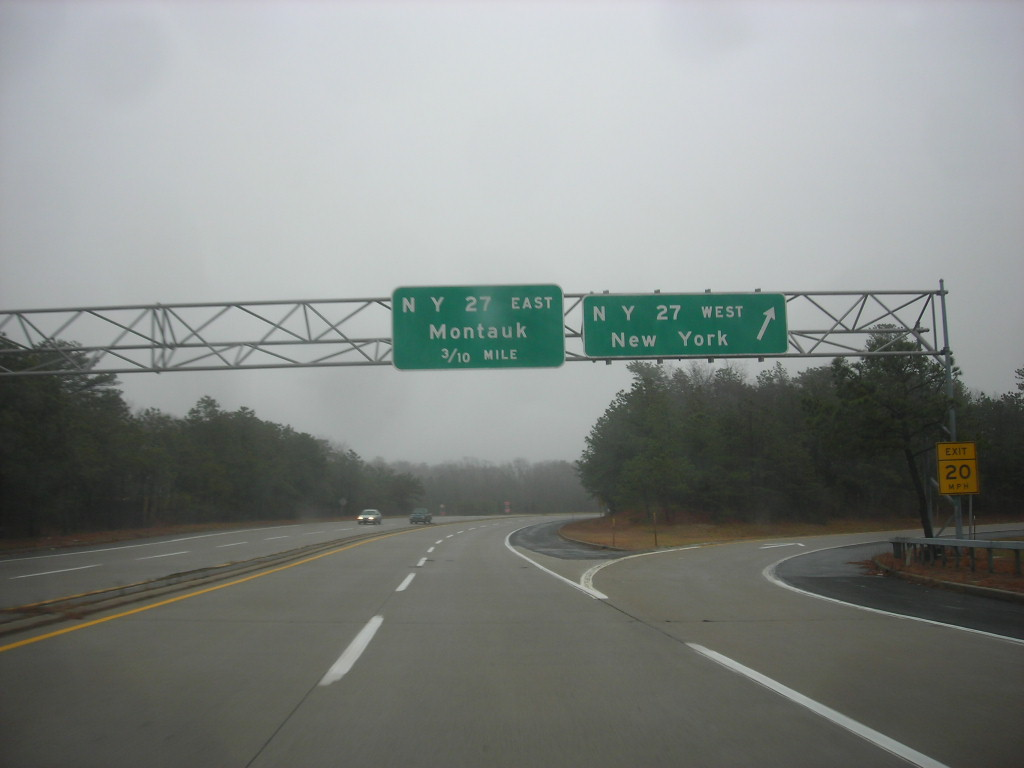
CR 104 southbound approaching the interchange with NY 27 (Sunrise Highway) in East Quogue

After NY 27, CR 104 enters dense woods and the speed limit increases to 55 miles per hour (89 km/h). The road intersects with the northern terminus of CR 31 (Old Riverhead Road), which services Westhampton and Gabreski Airport, at a traffic circle. After another northbound stretch, CR 104 enters a partial interchange with the southern terminus of CR 105 (Cross River Drive). After CR 105, CR 104 enters the more residential community of Riverside. It intersects Old Quogue Road, a former routing of the road that branches slightly to the east of. The road also changes names to Riverleigh Avenue and the speed limit is reduced to 40 miles per hour (64 km/h). Soon after, CR 104 reaches its northern terminus, the Riverside roundabout just across the Peconic River from the community of Riverhead. The roundabout, which was widened to two lanes in October 2018, provides access to CR 63 (Lake Avenue / Peconic Avenue), CR 94 and NY 24 (Flanders Road / Nugent Drive).

== History ==
In the 1930 renumbering of state highways in New York, the NY 113 designation was assigned to a previously unnumbered north–south connector between Montauk Highway (then-NY 27) in the village of Quogue and NY 25 in the hamlet of Riverhead. This also included Peconic Avenue in Riverhead, which was co-signed as part of NY 24 at the time. The concurrency was eliminated by 1970 as NY 113 was truncated to end at NY 24. The NY 113 designation was eliminated on March 29, 1972, when ownership and maintenance of NY 113 was transferred from the state of New York to Suffolk County. NY 113 was subsequently redesignated as CR 104.

The Riverside roundabout at the road's northern terminus was expanded to two lanes in October 2018 at a cost of $5.3 million, funded by Suffolk County. The original circle, largely unchanged since the 1930s, was a common source of congestion.

== Major intersections ==
The entire route is in Suffolk County.

Location	mi	km	Destinations	Notes
Quogue	0.00	0.00	CR 80 (Montauk Highway)	Southern terminus; former NY 27A
Quogue	2.4	3.9	Lewis Road – East Quogue	Former CR 104A
East Quogue	3.22	5.18	NY 27 – New York, Montauk	Exit 64 on NY 27
Riverside	4.52	7.27	CR 31 south – Westhampton, Gabreski Airport	Roundabout; northern terminus of CR 31
Riverside	6.09	9.80	CR 105 north – Northville, Orient Point	Partial interchange; southern terminus of CR 105; southbound access is via center median u-turn ramp
Riverside	7.45	11.99	NY 24 / CR 63 south / CR 94 west to I-495 west / NY 25 – County Center, New York, Hampton Bays, Montauk	Roundabout; northern terminus; northern terminus of CR 63; eastern terminus of CR 94
1.000 mi = 1.609 km; 1.000 km = 0.621 mi
