= County Route 94 (Suffolk County, New York) =

County road in Suffolk County, New York, US

County Route 94
- CR 94 highlighted in red, CR 94A highlighted in blue

Route information
- Maintained by SCDPW
- Length: 4.58 mi (7.37 km)
- Existed: August 4, 1955–present

Major junctions
- West end: River Road in Calverton
- I-495 in Calverton
- East end: NY 24 / CR 63 / CR 104 in Riverside

Location
- Country: United States
- State: New York
- County: Suffolk

Highway system
- County routes in New York; County Routes in Suffolk County
← CR 93	→ CR 95

County Route 94 (CR 94) is a 4.58-mile-long (7.37 km) east–west county route connecting Calverton to Riverhead in Suffolk County, New York, in the United States. It runs from just north of the Long Island Expressway (Interstate 495) at exit 71 and a traffic circle at CR 104 in Riverside. The majority of CR 94 overlaps with New York State Route 24 (NY 24), and both CR 94 and NY 24 are signed as north–south roads. Most of CR 94 was constructed in the early 1970s; however, the designation was assigned in 1955 and officially extended to its present length in 1963.

== Route description ==
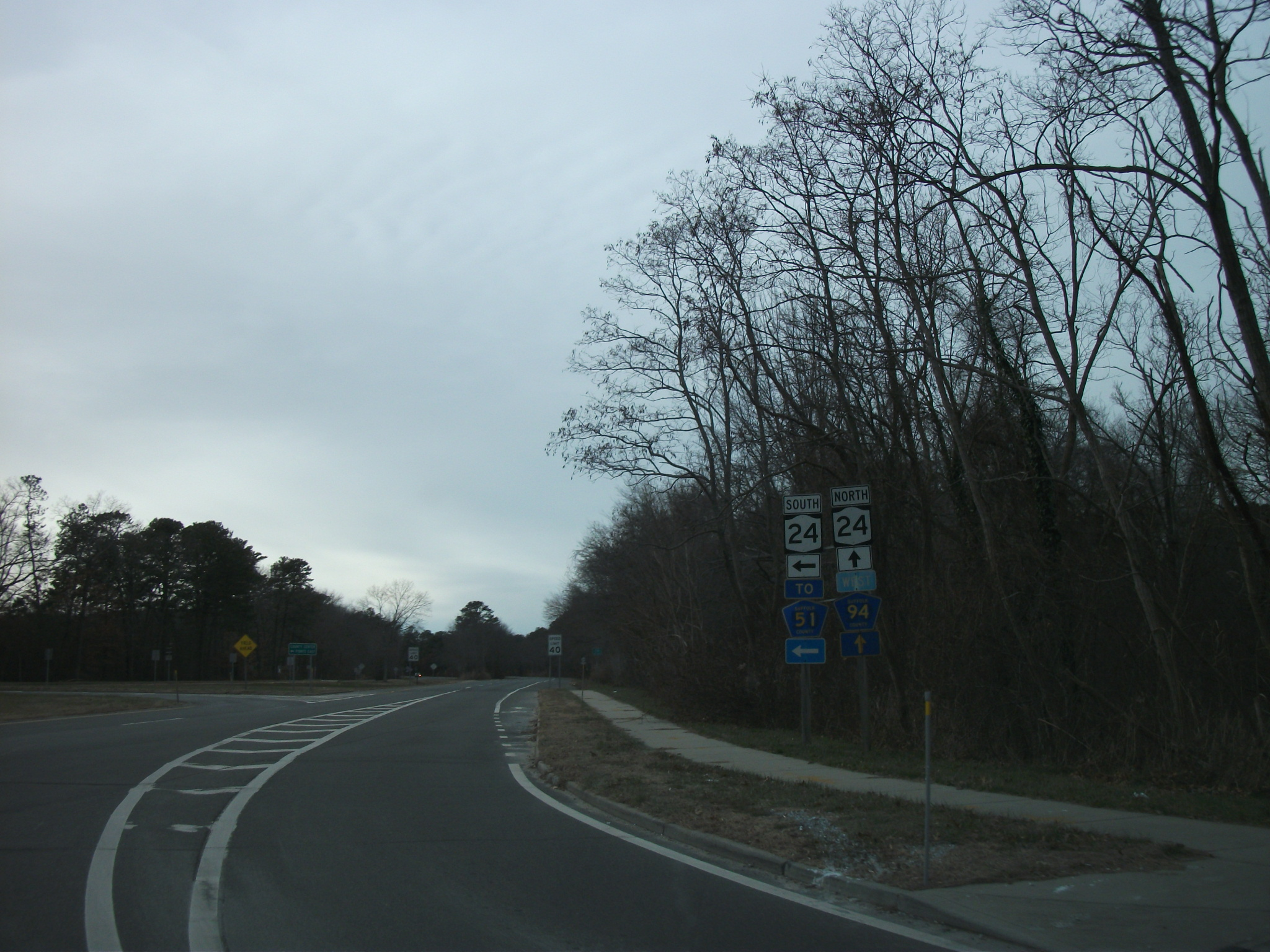
CR 94 and NY 24 north through Calverton

CR 94 begins at the intersection of Edwards Avenue and River Road in the hamlet of Calverton. It initially heads southward on Edwards Avenue as a four-lane divided highway, crossing the Peconic River to access an incomplete diamond interchange with I-495. Here, CR 94 changes names to Nugent Drive and becomes concurrent to NY 24, whose eastern segment begins at the exit. Past the junction, the road curves from south to east as it intersects with the northern end of Toppings Path and the western end of South River Road, the latter of which was relocated as part of I-495's construction. The route continues on a slightly northeastward track for the next 2.5 miles (4.0 km), passing through a mostly undeveloped area preserved by Suffolk County and the state of New York. One populated area exists in the vicinity of the intersection with Pinehurst Boulevard about 1 mile (1.6 km) east of the freeway.

As the route approaches the hamlet of Riverhead, it makes a more pronounced turn to the northeast, taking it within close proximity of the river once more. The forests finally give way to development roughly 0.5 miles (0.80 km) west of the community's center, where CR 94 becomes a two-lane divided road and serves Suffolk County's government buildings, including the Suffolk County Sheriff's Office complex. At this point, the median widens for U-turns at intersections with CR 94A and CR 51. Both intersections resemble traffic circles and function in a similar manner; however, at CR 51, CR 94 eastbound passes directly through what would be the island in the center of the junction. East of CR 51, CR 94 runs along the southern riverbank to a residential area directly south of the center of Riverhead, where it ends at a true traffic circle with CR 63 and CR 104. NY 24 continues eastward from the junction as Flanders Road.

== History ==
The CR 94 designation was assigned on August 4, 1955, to then-Center Drive between NY 25 west of Riverhead and the junction of NY 24 and NY 113 (now CR 104) south of the community. Center Drive was renamed Nugent Drive on August 8, 1960, and the CR 94 designation was extended westward to I-495 exit 71 on May 13, 1963, by way of a proposed extension to Nugent Drive. The piece of former CR 94 between the extension and NY 25 became CR 94A. Nugent Drive Extension was built in the early 1970s and opened to traffic c. 1973 as both CR 94 and as part of a realigned NY 24, reducing the gap between the two segments of NY 24 on opposite ends of Long Island. Prior to this, NY 24 took a right turn at former NY 113 and overlapped with the latter to reach NY 25. Nugent Drive Extension and Center Drive Spur (CR 94A) were intended to be part of a realigned NY 25A, with NY 25A overlapping with NY 24 between the Long Island Expressway and Center Drive Spur.

On November 17, 1965, a northwestern extension to Wading River was added to the route's official definition. The extension would have begun in the vicinity of I-495 exit 71 and ended in the vicinity of NY 25A's intersection with Sound Avenue. As proposed, the highway would have followed Edwards Avenue from I-495 north to the main line of the Long Island Rail Road, where it would break from Edwards Avenue and head to the northwest. CR 94 was to cross NY 25 at an interchange between Fresh Pond Road and Edwards Avenue before making a further northwestern turn and crossing Fresh Pond Road itself. Near Wading River, it would have connected to CR 54 by way of an interchange before replacing part of Sound Avenue near its junction with NY 25A.

A rest area once existed on both lanes of the road at the Brookhaven-Southampton town line. The westbound/northbound rest area was a standard right-access rest area along the north side, while the eastbound/southbound rest area was in the median.

== CR 94A ==
CR 94A is a 0.15-mile (0.24 km) four-lane highway, connecting CR 94 to NY 25 just west of Riverhead. The road, better known as Center Drive Spur, begins at the most westerly traffic circle along CR 94 and heads north across the Peconic River to the intersection of West Main Street (NY 25) and Court Street. CR 94A was assigned on May 13, 1963.

== Major intersections ==
The entire route is in Suffolk County.

Location	mi	km	Destinations	Notes
Calverton	0.00	0.00	River Road	Western terminus
Calverton	0.18	0.29	I-495 west – New York NY 24 begins	Exit 71 on I-495; western terminus of NY 24
Riverside	4.18	6.73	CR 94A north – Riverhead	Southern terminus of CR 94A
Riverside	4.38	7.05	CR 51 south – Moriches	Northern terminus of CR 51
Riverside	4.58	7.37	CR 63 south / CR 104 south – Westhampton, Quogue	Roundabout; northern termini of CR 63 and CR 104
Riverside	4.58	7.37	NY 24 south	Continuation south
1.000 mi = 1.609 km; 1.000 km = 0.621 mi: Concurrency terminus
