= Riverhead Central School District =

School district in the U.S. state of New York

Location
- Riverhead, Suffolk County, New York; United States

District information
- Type: Public
- Motto: Integrity, Creativity, Respect.
- Grades: PK-12
- Superintendent: Robert M. Hagan, Ed.D
- Schools: 7

Students and staff
- District mascot: Rippy The Riptide
- Colors: Blue and White

Other information
- Sports Nickname: Blue Waves
- District Offices: 814 Harrison Ave Riverhead, NY 11901
- Website: www.riverhead.net

Riverhead Central School District is a public school district located in the eastern part of Suffolk County, New York, United States. It primarily serves the Town of Riverhead, as well as 10 square miles (26 km^{2}) in the Town of Southampton and 3 square miles (8 km^{2}) in the Town of Brookhaven, and includes the census-designated places(CDPs) of Aquebogue, Baiting Hollow, Riverhead, and Riverside, and portions of Northville, Calverton, Flanders, Hampton Bays, Jamesport, Northampton, and Wading River. The total district size is 81 square miles (210 km^{2}).

The total enrollment for the 2022-2023 school year was 5,245 students.

== Schools ==
=== High schools ===
- Riverhead High School - The 33rd and current location of the Riverhead High School.

=== Intermediate schools ===
- Riverhead Middle School (7-8 grade).
- Pulaski Street Intermediate School (5-6 grade). Was built in 1938 and was the original location of Riverhead High School.

=== Elementary schools ===
- Aquebogue Elementary School (K-4). Building originally constructed in 1929.
- Phillips Avenue School (K-4)
- Riley Avenue School (K-4)
- Roanoke Avenue School (K-4). Building originally built in 1922 and was the 1st location of the Riverhead Library.
