= County Route 105 (Suffolk County, New York) =

County road in Suffolk County, New York, US

County Route 105
- Cross River Drive
- CR 105 highlighted in red

Route information
- Maintained by SCDPW
- Length: 5.30 mi (8.53 km)
- Existed: 1973–present

Major junctions
- South end: CR 104 in Riverside
- NY 24 in Riverside; NY 25 in Riverhead
- North end: Sound Avenue in Riverhead

Location
- Country: United States
- State: New York
- County: Suffolk

Highway system
- County routes in New York; County Routes in Suffolk County
← CR 104	→ CR 106

County Route 105 (CR 105) is a major north–south county road in Suffolk County, New York, in the United States. It is a four-lane, mostly divided highway that runs from CR 104 in Riverside to Sound Avenue in Riverhead, west of the western terminus of CR 48 in Mattituck.

== Route description ==
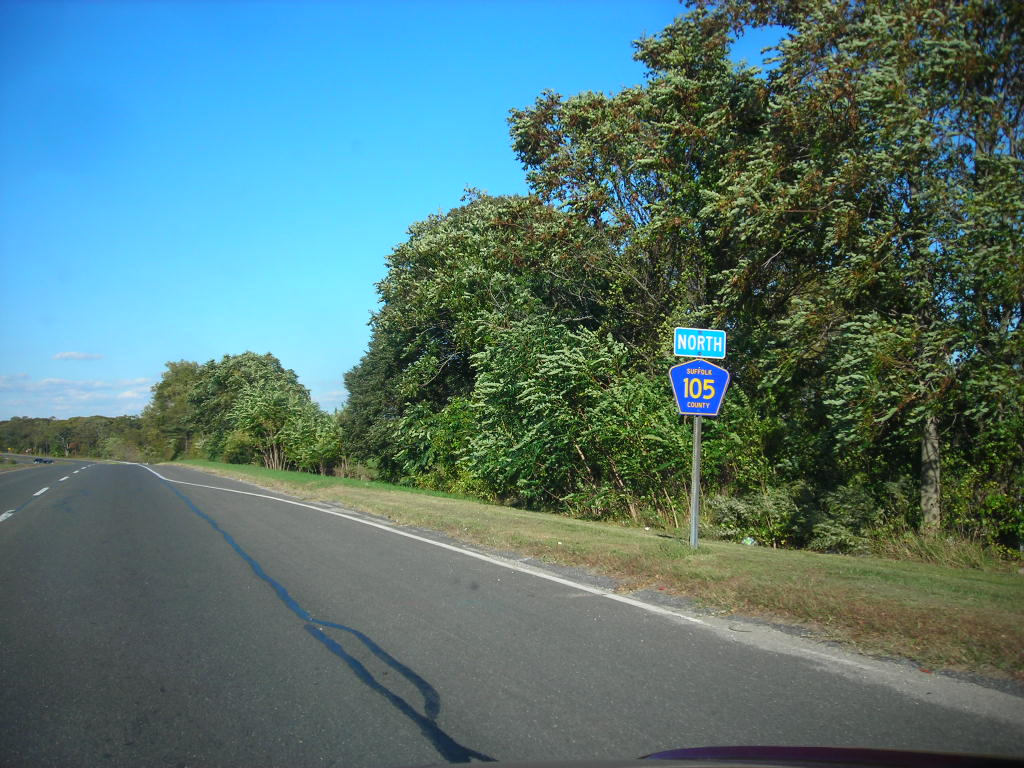
CR 105 heading northbound

The road begins as a four-lane expressway at a partial interchange with CR 104 in the David Allen Sarnoff Pine Barrens Preservation Area in Riverside. It immediately curves from an east–west trajectory to a north–south one before an at-grade intersection with New York State Route 24 (NY 24). The road runs north through Riverhead Golf Course and crossing Sawmill Creek. A diamond interchange exists for a park road in Indian Island County Park, followed by a quarter-cloverleaf interchange for Hubbard Avenue near the Main Line of the Long Island Rail Road.

North of NY 25 in Aquebogue, a cloverleaf interchange was planned for the formerly proposed Long Island Expressway Extension. After becoming a four-lane surface road, CR 105 replaces Union Avenue south of the intersection with CR 43 (Northville Turnpike) in Northville, only to run along the west side of the former Riverhead Air Park, and finally terminates at Sound Avenue.

== History ==
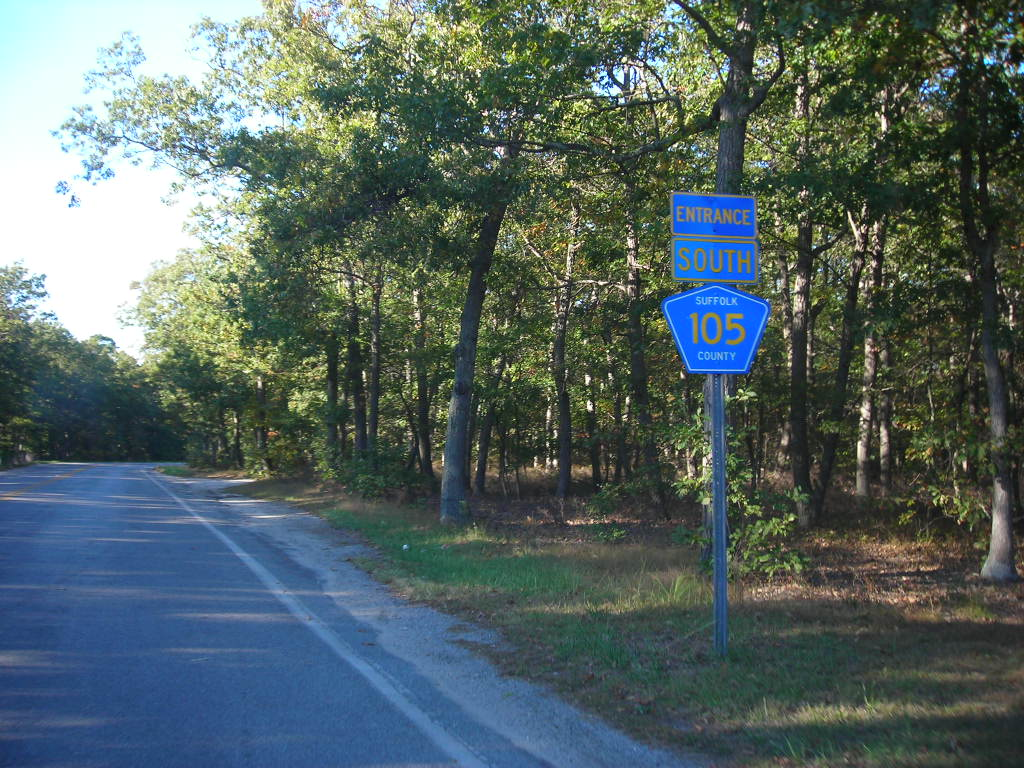
CR 105 entrance signage

The at-grade interchange with CR 104 was built for one purpose; a future extension into Central Suffolk County. The at-grade interchange was to be upgraded to a real interchange, as was the case with many existing intersections. From there, the road was to run west through the David A. Sarnoff Pine Barrens Preserve, then was to cross over CR 88 (Speonk–Riverhead Road), where it was to turn north as it ran along the south and west sides of the Suffolk County Community College Eastern Campus before crossing over CR 51 at Bald Hill. The road was to turn from north back to west as it ran along Hot Water Street and Cranberry Highway, which runs through land that was owned partially by the Calverton Naval Weapons Industrial Reserve Plant. A wye interchange was to exist with CR 90 before terminating at CR 111 (Port Jefferson–Westhampton Beach Highway). This was to be the eastern leg of the formerly proposed Central Suffolk Highway, which was designed to reunite the two sections of NY 24.

== Major intersections ==
Location	mi	km	Destinations	Notes
Flanders	0.00	0.00	CR 104 – Riverhead, Westhampton	Southern terminus; partial interchange
Flanders	0.94	1.51	NY 24 – Riverhead, Hampton Bays	At-grade intersection
Peconic River	1.60	2.57	Crossing over the Peconic River	
Community of Riverhead	2.40	3.86	Indian Point Park	Access via John’s Road or Hubbard Avenue by Indian Point Road
Community of Riverhead	2.80	4.51	Hubbard Avenue	
Community of Riverhead	2.98	4.80	NY 25 – Riverhead, Orient Point	At-grade intersection
Community of Riverhead	4.60	7.40	Northern end of limited-access section	
Community of Riverhead			CR 43 – Riverhead, Northville	
Community of Riverhead	5.30	8.53	Sound Avenue	Northern terminus
1.000 mi = 1.609 km; 1.000 km = 0.621 mi
