= New York State Route 24 =

Highway on Long Island, New York

New York State Route 24
- Hempstead Turnpike
- Map of Long Island with NY 24 highlighted in red

Route information
- Maintained by NYSDOT, NYCDOT, Nassau County, and Suffolk County
- Length: 30.84 mi (49.63 km)
- Existed: 1930–present

Western segment
- Length: 18.68 mi (30.06 km)
- West end: I-295 / NY 25 / Grand Central Parkway in Cunningham Park
- Major intersections: Cross Island Parkway in Queens Village; Meadowbrook State Parkway in Uniondale; Wantagh State Parkway in Levittown; NY 135 in Plainedge; Bethpage State Parkway at the Plainedge–South Farmingdale line
- East end: NY 110 in East Farmingdale

Eastern segment
- Length: 12.16 mi (19.57 km)
- North end: I-495 / CR 94 in Riverhead
- Major intersections: CR 63 / CR 104 in Riverside; CR 105 in Riverside; NY 27 in Hampton Bays
- South end: CR 80 in Hampton Bays

Location
- Country: United States
- State: New York
- Counties: Queens, Nassau, Suffolk

Highway system
- New York Highways; Interstate; US; State; Reference; Parkways
← NY 23B	→ NY 25

New York State Route 24 (NY 24) is a 30.84-mile-long (49.63 km) east–west state highway on Long Island in the U.S. state of New York. The highway is split into two segments; the longer western section extends 18.68 miles (30.06 km) from an interchange with Interstate 295 (I-295, named the Clearview Expressway) and NY 25 (Hillside Avenue) in the Queens Village section of the New York City borough of Queens to an intersection with NY 110 in East Farmingdale in the Suffolk County town of Babylon. The shorter eastern section, located in eastern Suffolk County, extends 12.16 miles (19.57 km) from an interchange with I-495 in Calverton to an intersection with County Route 80 (CR 80) in Hampton Bays.

NY 24 is one of three highways in New York that are split into two segments; the others are NY 42 in the Catskills and NY 878 in Queens and Nassau County. Like NY 42, NY 24 was a continuous route when it was assigned as part of the 1930 renumbering of state highways in New York. The highway was split into two pieces in the mid-1930s. For a brief period during the late 1950s and early 1960s, NY 24 was routed on the Long Island Expressway from Manhattan to East Hills while its original surface routing was designated New York State Route 24A.

In Nassau County, most of the route is known as Hempstead Turnpike.

== Western segment ==
=== Queens Village to Nassau Coliseum ===
NY 24 begins at an intersection with the southern end of I-295 (the Clearview Expressway) and a junction with NY 25 (Hillside Avenue) in the Queens Village section of Queens. NY 24 proceeds southeast along two one-way couplets along Hollis Court Boulevard and 212th Street through dense housing for several blocks (the only unsigned section of the route). At the intersection with 91st Avenue, the couplets bend southward, entering an intersection with Jamaica Avenue, where NY 24 turns off Hollis Court and 212th and follows Jamaica Avenue eastbound for a block. At the junction with Hempstead Avenue, NY 24 turns off Jamaica for Hempstead, crossing under the Long Island Rail Road (LIRR) main line through Queens Village.

Passing a Long Island Rail Road substation, NY 24 proceeds southeast along the four-lane commercial strip of Hempstead Avenue, intersecting with Springfield Boulevard as it crosses through Queens Village. A short distance later, the route enters a partial cloverleaf interchange with the Cross Island Parkway's exit 26B. After crossing the Cross Island Parkway, NY 24 enters Nassau County, changing names to Hempstead Turnpike and passing south of Belmont Park Racetrack and the Belmont Park LIRR station, along with UBS Arena, the home of the New York Islanders of the National Hockey League. Now a six-lane boulevard through the town of Hempstead, NY 24 crosses several parking facilities used for Belmont Park Racetrack, UBS Arena and Belmont Park Village, paralleling the grounds to the south for several blocks.

After crossing into the Elmont neighborhood of Hempstead, NY 24 reduces to four lanes, crossing through a long commercial strip east of the racetrack. The route crosses through East Elmont before entering Floral Park Crest, where the roadway bends northeast through Hempstead. After crossing an intersection with Covert and Meacham Avenues, NY 24 straightens eastward once again, crossing a long commercial strip through town. The route soon makes a short bend to the southeast in Franklin Square, crossing an intersection with New Hyde Park Road and Franklin Avenue, and later continuing into West Hempstead. In West Hempstead, NY 24 crosses over the former connection between the Long Island Railroad West Hempstead Branch and Hempstead Branch before entering an intersection with NY 102 (Front Street).

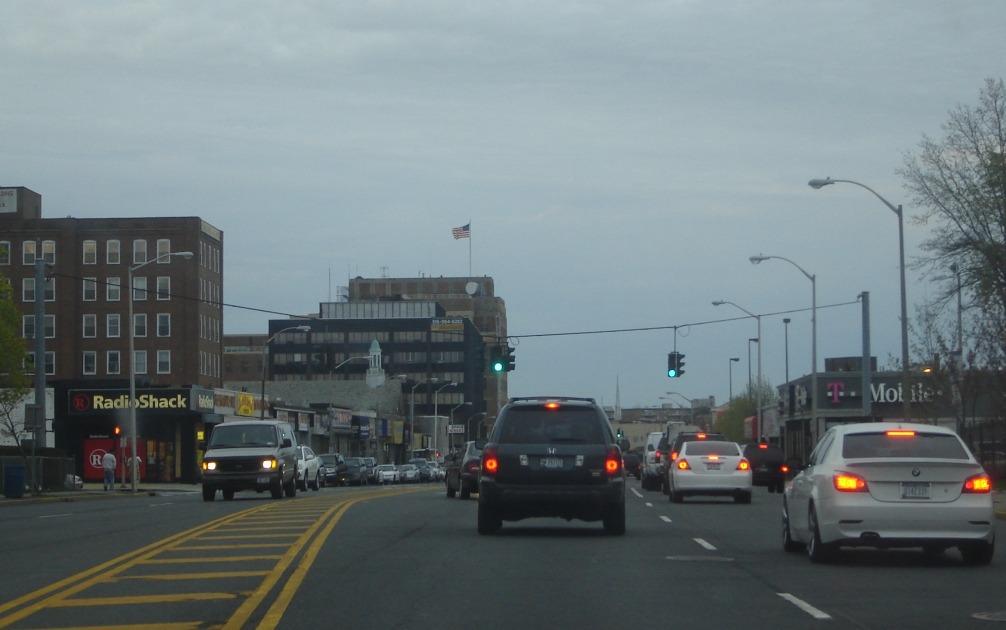
Eastbound lanes of NY 24 (Fulton Avenue) in the Village of Hempstead.

At this intersection, NY 24 drops the Hempstead Turnpike moniker, changing to Fulton Avenue. NY 24 then proceeds northeast through downtown Hempstead, remaining a four-lane commercial street through the city, bending south of a local park. At the junction with Clinton Street, NY 24 bends east for a block, turning northeast again at Peninsula Boulevard. Paralleling NY 102, NY 24 returns to its northeastern progression, regaining the Hempstead Turnpike moniker in front of Hofstra University. At Oak Street on the western end of the campus, NY 24 becomes a four-lane divided highway through Hempstead, passing south of Hofstra University Stadium and past several parking lots for the campus. East of Hofstra Boulevard, the road widens to six lanes. Just after Earle Ovington Boulevard, the route continues east in to Uniondale and runs alongside the parking lots for Nassau Coliseum, the former home of the Islanders from their 1972 founding until 2015, then 2018 until 2021, when they moved 7.7 miles (12.4 km) west down the pike to UBS Arena.

=== Nassau Coliseum to Farmingdale ===
At the junction with Glenn Curtiss Boulevard, NY 24 passes the main entrance to the Coliseum's parking lots before passing north of Rexcorp Plaza. Just after Rexcorp Plaza, NY 24 enters an interchange (exits M4 and M5) with the Meadowbrook State Parkway. After the Meadowbrook, NY 24 enters East Meadow, remaining a six-lane boulevard past Merrick Avenue, passing south of Eisenhower Park. While the park runs along the westbound lanes, several commercial businesses line the eastbound lanes. After Bly Road, the park changes over to more businesses and a short distance later, NY 102 terminates at NY 24 at Front Street. After Carman Avenue, the route passes south of Nassau University Medical Center before returning to the commercial businesses that have surrounded the roadway.

Just to the east of Nassau University Medical Center, NY 24 enters an intersection with NY 106 (North Newbridge Road), and four blocks later, exit W3 of the Wantagh State Parkway. Continuing east through the town of Hempstead, NY 24 remains a six-lane divided boulevard, crossing north of the Levittown Public Library as the route crosses into Levittown, intersecting with Jerusalem Avenue at the western end of the community. NY 24 continues east along a commercial strip into an intersection with North Wantagh Avenue, bending southeast into an intersection with NY 107 (Hicksville Road). The route then crosses into the town of Oyster Bay. Retaining the Hempstead Turnpike name, NY 24 enters the Plainedge neighborhood of Oyster Bay.

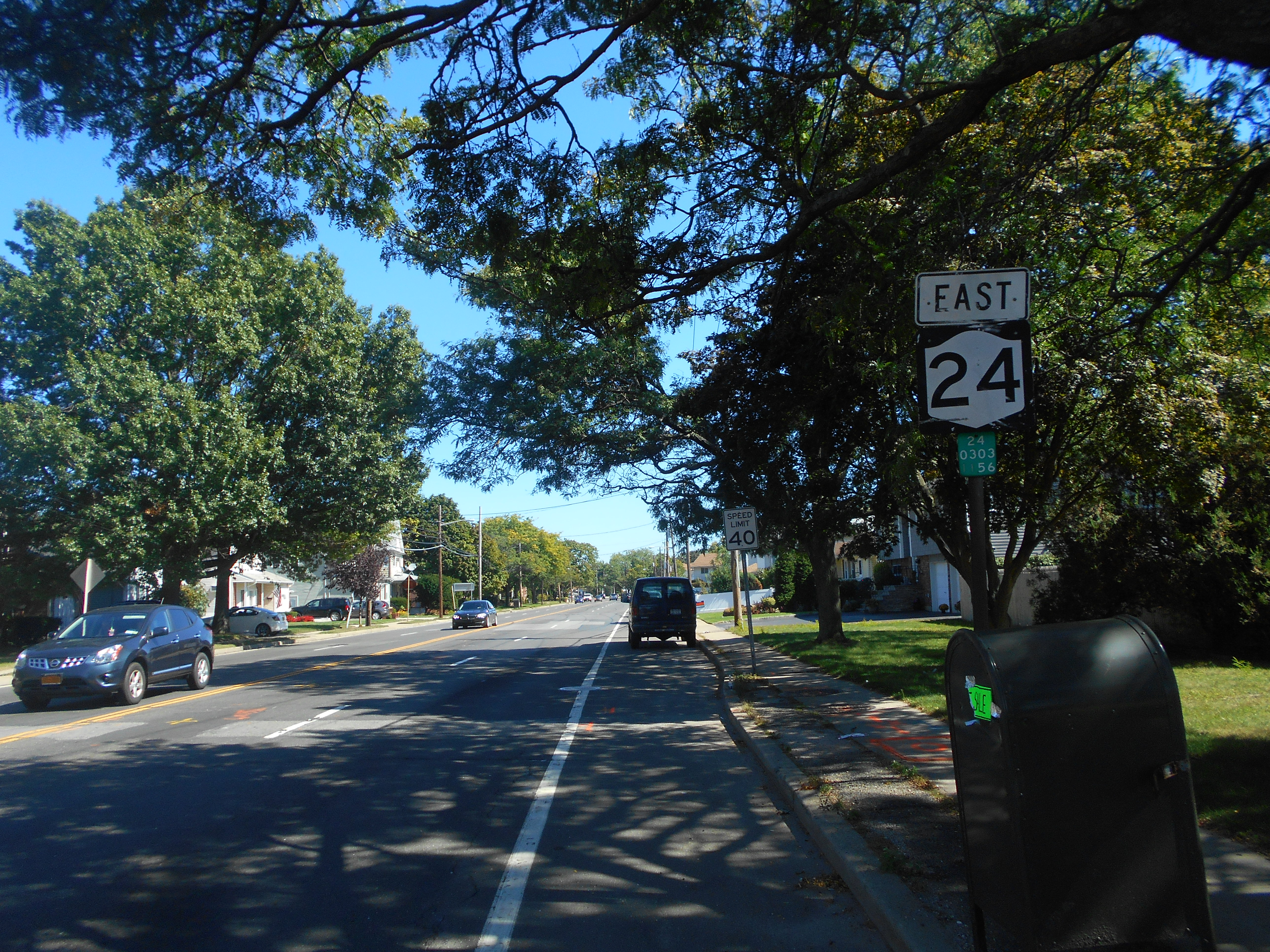
NY 24 eastbound after Secatogue Avenue in Farmingdale

After passing St. Joseph's Hospital, NY 24 crosses through Plainedge and into a large cloverleaf interchange (exit 7) with the Seaford–Oyster Bay Expressway (NY 135). Three blocks to the east, NY 24 condenses to four lanes, entering a partial cloverleaf interchange with the Bethpage State Parkway (exit B3). After crossing over the Bethpage, the route proceeds northeast through the town of Oyster Bay, crossing into the town of Farmingdale. After crossing under a line of the Long Island Rail Road, the route crosses Merritt Avenue at-grade, entering a junction with NY 109 (Fulton Street). Past the junction with NY 109, NY 24 changes monikers to Conklin Street, crossing through Farmingdale as a four lane street.

For several blocks, NY 24 passes residential homes, before becoming a two-lane commercial street. A short distance to the east, the route intersects with Secatogue Avenue, which connects to the Farmingdale station to the northwest. Re-expanding to four lanes, NY 24 crosses through Farmingdale on Conklin before crossing the county line into Suffolk County. Now in the town of Babylon, retaining the Conklin Street moniker before entering an at-grade junction with NY 110 (Broad Hollow Road) in front of Airport Plaza. This junction serves as the eastern terminus of NY 24's western segment.

As of October 2014, NY 24's Farmingdale section between its junction with New York State Route 109 and the eastern terminus at New York State Route 110 has been reduced to a two lane street.

== Eastern segment ==
The eastern segment of NY 24 begins at exit 71 of the Long Island Expressway (I-495) in the Calverton section of Brookhaven just east of the former Calverton station. NY 24 proceeds eastward along Edwards Avenue as a four-lane divided highway, concurrent with County Route 94 (CR 94) before changing monikers at the corner of South River Road. NY 24 bends northeast along Nugent Drive through Brookhaven. NY 24 and CR 94 cross through Peconic Bog County Park, crossing into the town of Southampton. After leaving Peconic Bog County Park, the routes bend northeast along Nugent, paralleling the Peconic River past the Suffolk County jail and into a roundabout in Riverside.

At this roundabout, NY 24 becomes a two-lane divided road and passes north of county offices for Suffolk County, leaving the concurrency with CR 94, which proceeds north into Riverhead. Meanwhile, NY 24 enters another roundabout, this time the northern terminus of CR 51 (Center Drive South). A short distance further east, NY 24 enters a third roundabout in Riverside, this time serving the terminus of CR 104 (Riverleigh Avenue) and CR 63 (Lake Avenue / Peconic Avenue). After this traffic circle, NY 24 continues east along Flanders Road as a two-lane surface road, which parallels the Peconic River. The route soon bends southeast through Riverside, crossing an at-grade intersection with CR 105 (Cross River Drive).

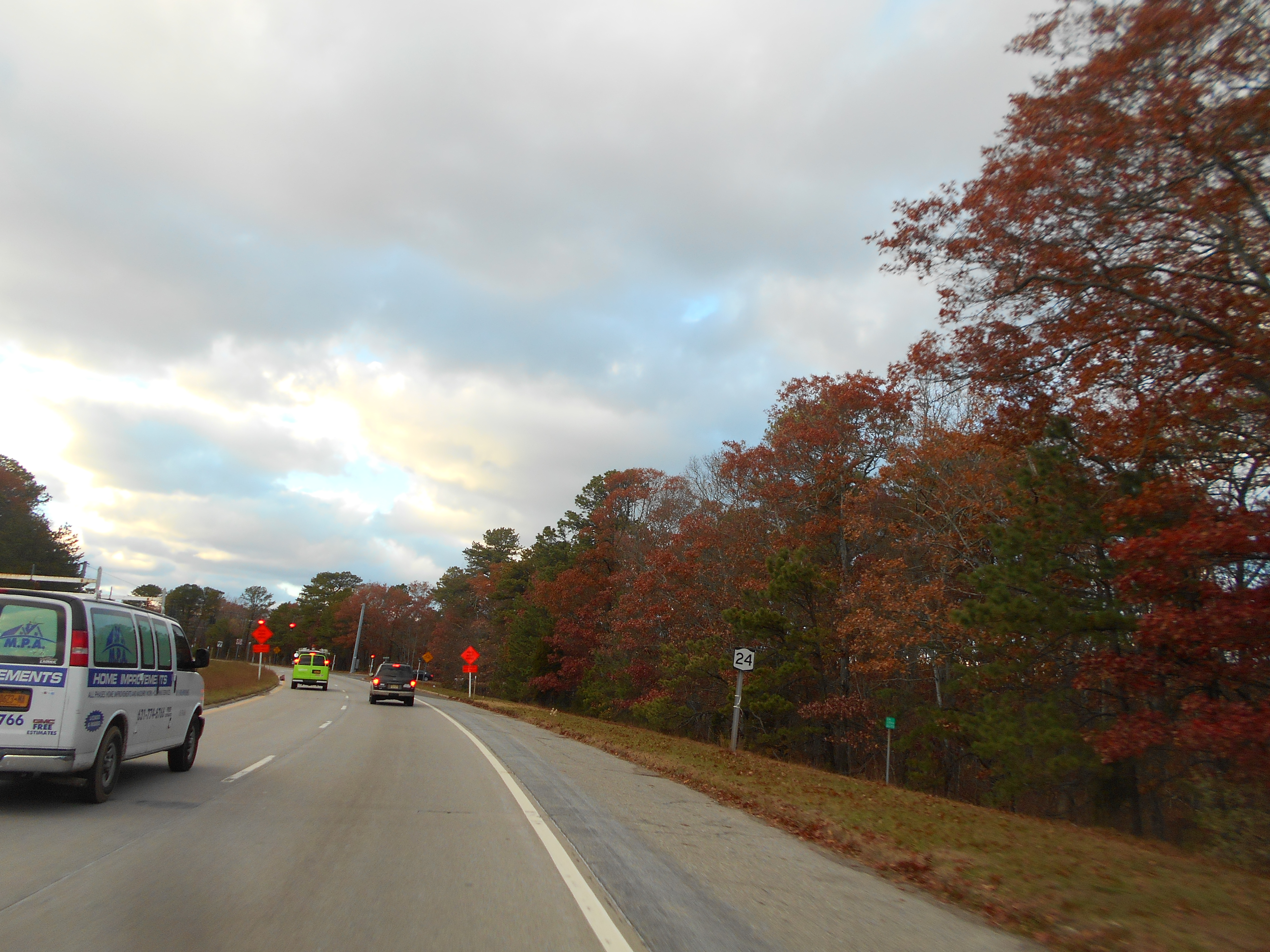
NY 24 westbound in Hampton Bays

NY 24 soon turns eastward into the hamlet of Flanders, becoming a two-lane residential street through the community. At Wood Road Trail, NY 24 bends southeast through Flanders, paralleling the eastern end of Reeves Bay. Making a large bend along Reeves Bay, the route passes several bayside marinas and the Big Duck, a building on the westbound side of NY 24 designed in the shape of a duck. After Pleasure Drive, NY 24 winds eastward through Southampton, working out of the Reeves Bay area for a large dense area of trees to the east. A short distance later, the route enters Sears Bellows County Park, soon changing monikers to Riverhead–Hampton Bays Road. At Bellows Pond Road, NY 24 leaves the county park, passing south of Red Creek Park before bending southeast into an interchange with Sunrise Highway (NY 27) at exit 65. Just after the cloverleaf, NY 24 ends at an intersection with CR 80 (West Montauk Highway) in the community of Hampton Bays.

== History ==
NY 24 was originally a continuous route between the New York City limits and Hampton Bays when it was assigned as part of the 1930 renumbering of state highways in New York. The route was extended into New York City in mid-December 1934. It entered the city on Hempstead Avenue and followed 212th Street, Hillside Avenue, and Queens Boulevard to Skillman Avenue (NY 25). NY 24 joined NY 25 here, overlapping NY 25 (and NY 25A west of Northern Boulevard) along Queens Boulevard and across the Queensboro Bridge into Manhattan. The three routes continued west for several more blocks along 2nd Avenue and 57th Street to Park Avenue (then NY 22 and NY 100), where NY 24, NY 25, and NY 25A all ended. The section of NY 24 between Farmingdale and Riverhead was removed c. 1936, splitting NY 24 into two pieces.

=== New York City and vicinity ===
The overlap with NY 25 was extended twice over the next decade. In the late 1930s, NY 25 was realigned to follow Queens Boulevard (NY 24) from Skillman Avenue to Horace Harding Boulevard. It was altered again in the early 1940s to use the section of Queens Boulevard between Horace Harding Boulevard and Union Turnpike. The concurrency was reduced slightly in the mid-1940s, however, as NY 24 was rerouted to follow the Crosstown Connecting Highway (now the right-of-way of I-278) and Midtown Highway (I-495) to the Queens–Midtown Tunnel. It then continued through the tunnel to end at NY 1A in Manhattan. The Crosstown Connection Highway and the Midtown Highway were upgraded into the first portions of the Brooklyn–Queens Expressway (BQE) and the Queens Midtown Expressway, respectively, in the early 1950s. At the time, the Queens Midtown Expressway ended at 61st Street.

By 1956, the highway had been renamed the Long Island Expressway (LIE) and extended east to Queens Boulevard. Although NY 24 intersected the highway twice—where it left the LIE at the BQE and at Queens Boulevard—NY 24 still followed the BQE and Queens Boulevard. The portion of the LIE from Queens Boulevard to the Northern State Parkway (now exit 38) was completed in the late 1950s, at which time NY 24 was rerouted to follow the LIE between Manhattan and East Hills. The original routing of NY 24 from the BQE to Farmingdale was then redesignated as NY 24A. However, unlike NY 24 before it, NY 24A left NY 25 at the junction of Queens Boulevard and Hillside Avenue and followed Queens Boulevard and Jamaica Avenue through Queens. The portion of NY 24 from Manhattan to the Clearview Expressway was co-signed as I-495 by 1960.

NY 24 was removed from the LIE and shifted southward to replace NY 24A c. 1962. However, NY 24 was truncated to begin at the LIE instead. On January 1, 1970, NY 24 was truncated again to the junction of Queens Boulevard and Hillside Avenue. This eliminated its overlap with NY 25, which was altered to follow NY 24's former routing through Queens. NY 24 was rerouted once more between 1977 and 1981 to follow 212th Street once again to end at NY 25 and I-295.

=== Suffolk County ===
In Riverhead, NY 24 initially had a brief overlap with the northernmost portion of CR 104 (then NY 113) between Riverleigh Avenue (CR 103) and Main Street (NY 25), where both terminated. This concurrency was eliminated by 1970 as NY 113 was truncated to end at NY 24. On July 1, 1972, NY 24 was extended westward along a new divided highway following the course of the Peconic River. The roadway began at the Long Island Expressway and ended just south of Riverhead. This segment of NY 24 is maintained by Suffolk County and is co-signed as CR 94. It is one of three locally maintained sections of NY 24; the others are in Queens, where the route is maintained by the New York City Department of Transportation (NYCDOT), and in the village of Hempstead, where the route is maintained by Nassau County as CR 107 from North Franklin Street to Truro Lane.

In the 1960s, there was a proposal to build a bypass around the current eastern terminus of the western segment of NY 24. The highway, named the "Republic Bypass", would begin at NY 24 midway between the Nassau–Suffolk County line and NY 110 and would parallel Conklin Street along its north side to Wellwood Avenue, where the bypass would merge with Long Island Avenue. The bypass was part of a plan to re-link the western and eastern segments. Other proposed extensions built by Suffolk County were Suffolk Avenue (CR 100), Furrows Road, Peconic Avenue, and the formerly proposed Central Suffolk Highway (CR 90). The right-of-way for the Central Suffolk Highway can be found beneath the bridge carrying CR 101 bridge over the main line of the Long Island Rail Road.

== Major intersections ==
County	Location	mi	km	Destinations	Notes
Queens	Queens Village	0.00	0.00	I-295 north (Clearview Expressway) / NY 25 (Hillside Avenue) / Grand Central Parkway – Bronx	Unsigned western terminus; southern terminus of I-295; exit 21 on Grand Central Parkway
Queens	Queens Village	1.75	2.82	Cross Island Parkway – Whitestone Bridge, Verrazano Bridge	Exits 26B-C on Cross Island Parkway
Nassau	West Hempstead	6.62	10.65	Front Street (NY 102 east)	
Nassau	Uniondale–East Meadow line	9.65	15.53	Meadowbrook State Parkway – Mineola, Jones Beach	Exits M5-M4 on Meadowbrook State Parkway
Nassau	East Meadow	11.17	17.98	NY 102 west (Front Street)	Eastern terminus of NY 102
Nassau	East Meadow	11.94	19.22	NY 106 (Newbridge Road)	
Nassau	East Meadow–Levittown line	12.63	20.33	Wantagh State Parkway – Westbury, Jones Beach	Exits W3E-W on Wantagh State Parkway
Nassau	Plainedge	15.21	24.48	NY 107 (Hicksville Road)	
Nassau	Plainedge	15.65	25.19	NY 135 – Seaford, Syosset	Exits 7E-W on NY 135
Nassau	Plainedge–South Farmingdale line	16.01	25.77	Bethpage State Parkway	Exit B3 on Bethpage State Parkway
Nassau	Farmingdale	16.89	27.18	NY 109 east (Fulton Street)	Western terminus of NY 109
Suffolk	East Farmingdale	18.68	30.06	NY 110 – Huntington, Amityville, Republic Airport	Eastern terminus
Suffolk	Gap in route				
Suffolk	Manorville–Calverton line	0.00	0.00	CR 94 west	Continuation west
Suffolk	Manorville–Calverton line	0.00	0.00	I-495 west – New York	Exit 71 on I-495
Suffolk	Riverside	3.91	6.29	CR 94A north – Riverhead	Southern terminus of CR 94A
Suffolk	Riverside	4.18	6.73	CR 51 south – Moriches	Northern terminus of CR 51
Suffolk	Riverside	4.32	6.95	CR 63 south / CR 104 south – Westhampton, Quogue CR 94 ends	Roundabout; northern termini of CR 63 and CR 104; eastern terminus of CR 94
Suffolk	Riverside–Flanders line	5.61	9.03	CR 105 – Northville, Orient Point	
Suffolk	Hampton Bays	11.92	19.18	NY 27 – New York, Montauk	Exits 65S-N on NY 27
Suffolk	Hampton Bays	12.16	19.57	CR 80 (Montauk Highway)	Southern terminus; former NY 27A
1.000 mi = 1.609 km; 1.000 km = 0.621 mi: Concurrency terminus

== See also ==
- List of county routes in Nassau County, New York
