= Litchhult Square =

Green space in Queens, New York

Coordinates: 40.715989°N 73.745007°W

Litchhult Square is a .074-acre public green space in Hollis neighborhood of Queens, New York, formed by the triangular intersection of Hempstead Avenue, Jamaica Avenue, and 213th Street. The merge of Hempstead Avenue with Jamaica Avenue dates to colonial times.

Both roads carry state route designations, respectively as NY-24 and NY-25. The city acquired this land in 1929 by condemnation as part of the widening of Jamaica Avenue. It was designated Litchhult Square in Local Law 55 of 1938 passed by the City Council, in honor of a prominent local family.

Litchhult Square was named after Lieutenant Andrew Slover Litchhult (b. March 1895). He was a WWI veteran who fought in France. He died October 8, 1936, as a result of complications from the encephalitis he contracted while fighting overseas during the Spanish flu outbreak in Europe. He was discharged honorably in 1919. His wife, Veronica Agnes Litchhult, was very active in the American Legion from the 1930s until she died in 1955.
