= Peconic River =

River in the United States of America

Coordinates: 40°54′53.67″N 72°41′00.34″W

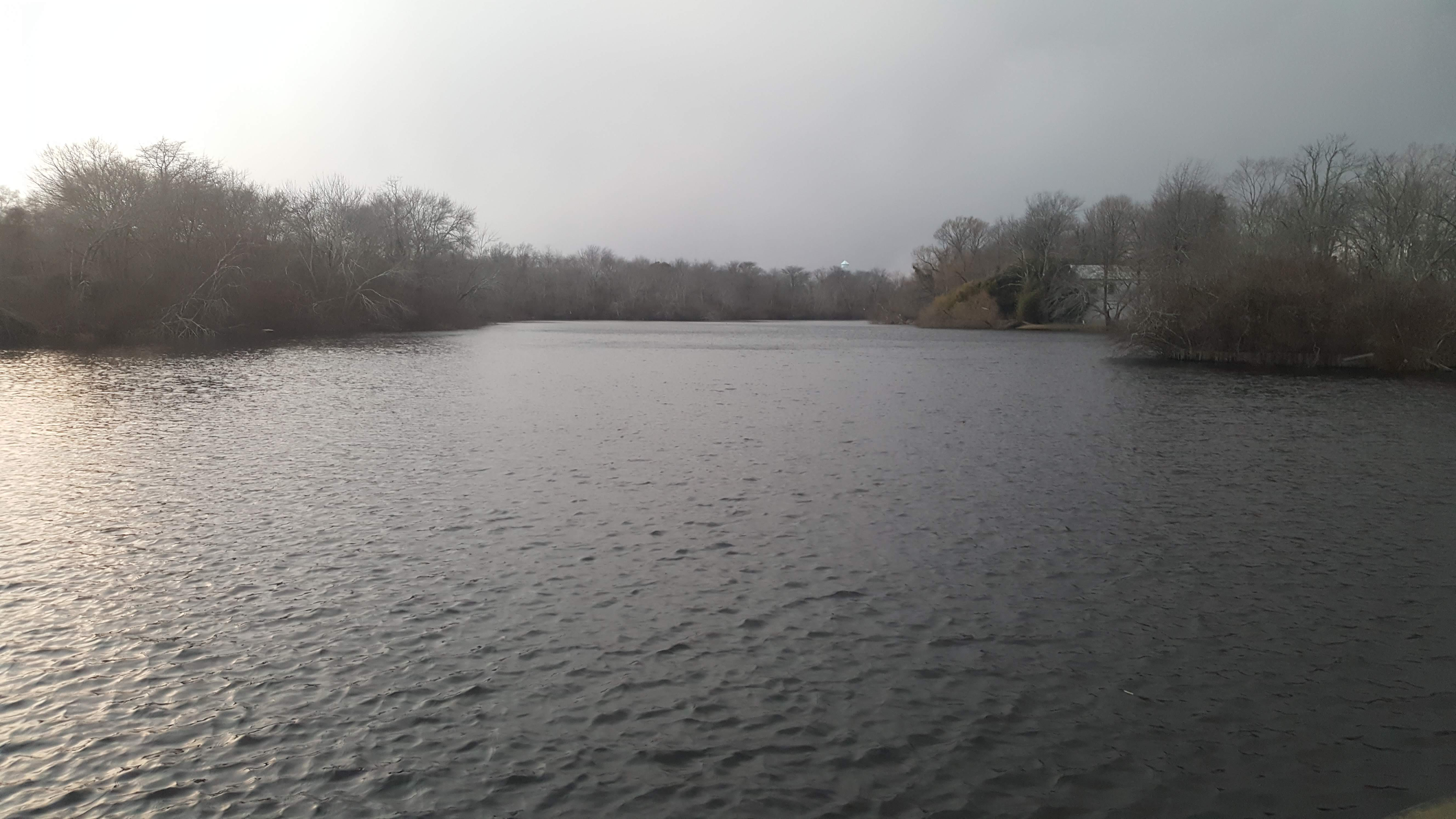
- The Peconic near its mouth in Riverhead, New York

Location
- Country: United States

Physical characteristics
- Source
  - location: Brookhaven National Laboratory
  - elevation: 249 feet (76 m)
- Mouth
  - location: Riverhead/Flanders Bay
  - elevation: 0 ft (0 m)
- Length: 15 mi (24 km)
- Basin size: 75 mi^{2} (190 km^{2})
- Discharge
  - average: 37 cubic feet per second (1 m^{3}/s)

The Peconic River is a river within Suffolk County on Long Island, New York. The river is located in the eastern end of Long Island. The Peconic River drains an area between the Harbor Hill Moraine and flows into Flanders Bay, which in turn connects to Peconic Bay east of Riverhead.

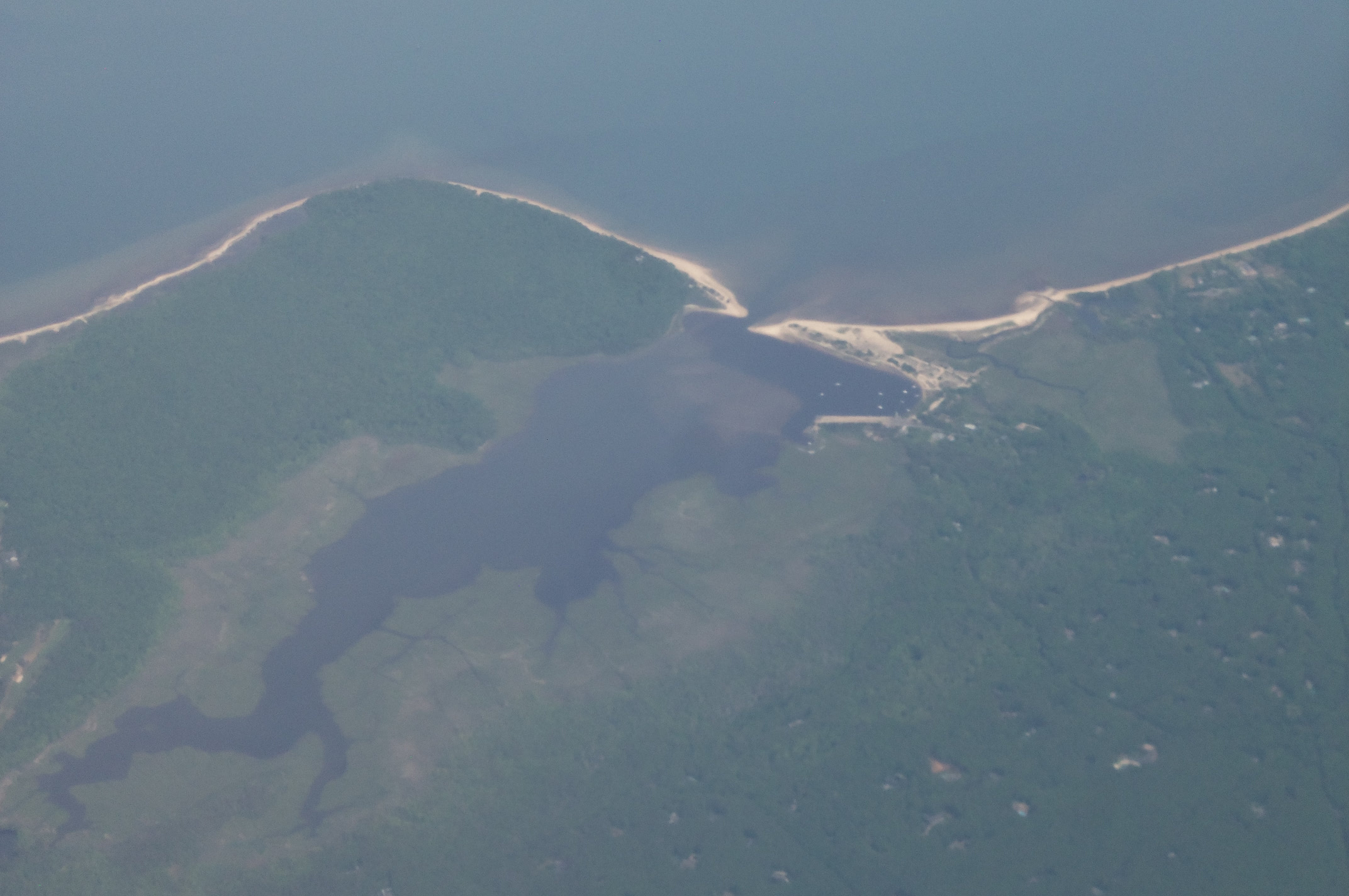
Peconic River

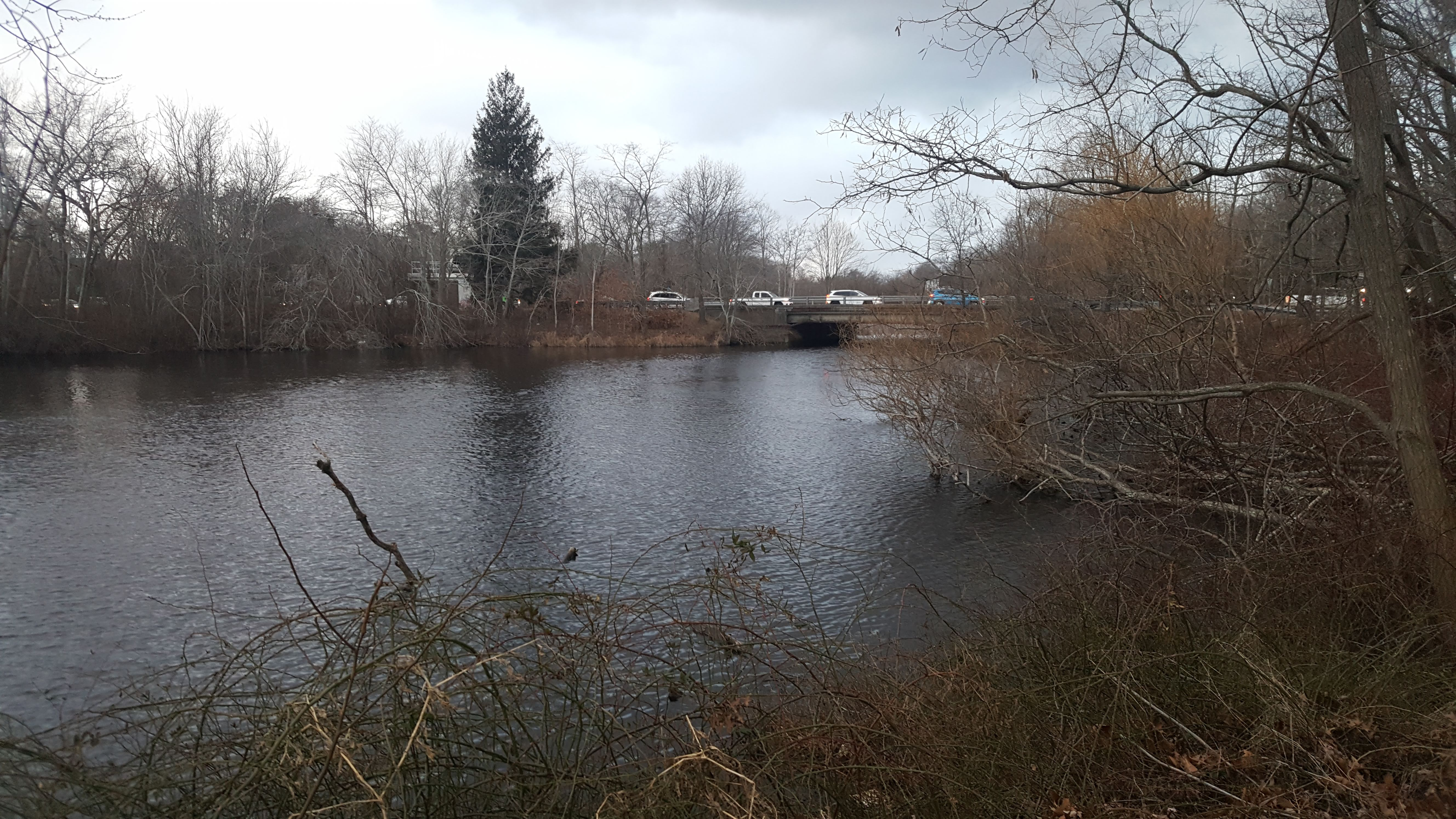
The Peconic River near its mouth in Riverhead, New York

The river originates in bogs and wetlands in central Long Island near the Brookhaven National Laboratory and flows eastward to the Peconic Bay. It is the longest river on Long Island and is almost entirely within the Central Long Island Pine Barrens publicly protected area, which was set up in 1993 to protect its relative wilderness standing.

It is fresh water until about the center of Riverhead where it becomes an estuary.

The river is slow-moving, making it ideal for canoeing and kayaking.

It forms the border between Brookhaven and Riverhead towns as well as the border between Riverhead and Southampton.

== List of crossings of the Peconic River ==
Crossings	Carries	Location	Coordinates
Unnamed road bridge	Schultz Road (former Suffolk CR 25)	South Manor and Calverton	
Unnamed road bridge	David Terry Street	Manorville and Calverton	'
Unnamed road bridge	Connecticut Avenue	Manorville and Calverton	
Unnamed railroad bridge	Main Line of the Long Island Rail Road	Calverton	
Unnamed road bridge	Edwards Avenue	Calverton	
Unnamed Road bridge	I-495 (Long Island Expressway)	Calverton	
Peconic Lake Dam	Dam Road (Between South River and Forge Roads)	Calverton	
Unnamed road bridge	Unnamed dead end street to LIPA Sub-station from NY 25	Riverside and Riverhead	
Unnamed road bridge	CR 94A (Center Drive)	Riverside and Riverhead	
Unnamed road bridge	Peconic Avenue (former NY 24-113 overlap)	Riverside and Riverhead	
Unnamed road bridge	CR 105 (Cross River Drive)	Flanders and Riverhead	

== See also ==
- List of New York rivers
