= East Quogue, New York =

- Hamlet and census-designated place
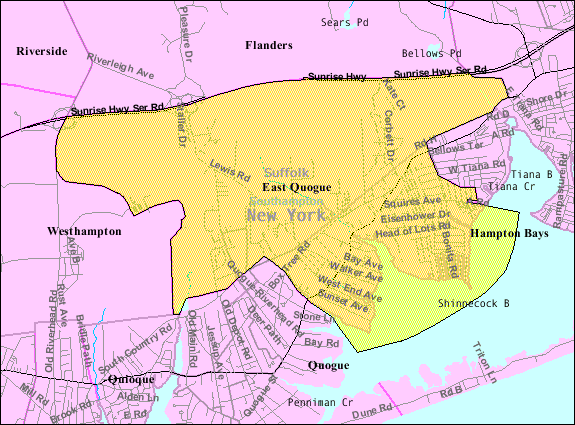

- Location on Long Island Location within the state of New York Location within the contiguous United States
- Coordinates: 40°51′3″N 72°34′34″W
- Country: United States
- State: New York
- County: Suffolk
- Town: Southampton

Area
  - Total: 12.11 sq mi (31.36 km^{2})
  - Land: 8.71 sq mi (22.57 km^{2})
  - Water: 3.40 sq mi (8.80 km^{2})
- Elevation: 13 ft (4 m)

Population (2020)
  - Total: 5,557
  - Density: 637.8/sq mi (246.26/km^{2})
- Time zone: UTC-5 (Eastern (EST))
  - Summer (DST): UTC-4 (EDT)
- ZIP code: 11942
- Area codes: 631, 934
- FIPS code: 36-22832
- GNIS feature ID: 0949224

East Quogue is a hamlet and census-designated place (CDP) in the Town of Southampton in Suffolk County, on Long Island, in New York, United States. As of the 2020 census, East Quogue had a population of 5,557.

== History ==
East Quogue originally settled in 1673 and was known as Fourth Neck. In the 2010s, portions of the hamlet attempted to incorporate as a village. The attempts to incorporate the village failed in 2019 after the majority of voters within the proposed village's boundaries resident voted against incorporating.

== Geography ==
According to the United States Census Bureau, the CDP has a total area of 11.5 square miles (29.9 km^{2}), of which 8.9 square miles (23.0 km^{2}) is land and 2.7 square miles (7.0 km^{2}), or 23.23%, is water.

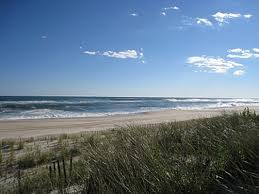
A beach in East Quogue.

== Demographics ==
Historical population
Census	Pop.	Note	%±
2020	5,557		—
U.S. Decennial Census

=== 2020 census ===
As of the 2020 census, East Quogue had a population of 5,557. The median age was 45.1 years. 20.5% of residents were under the age of 18 and 20.1% of residents were 65 years of age or older. For every 100 females there were 99.3 males, and for every 100 females age 18 and over there were 100.5 males age 18 and over.

91.7% of residents lived in urban areas, while 8.3% lived in rural areas.

There were 2,152 households in East Quogue, of which 29.7% had children under the age of 18 living in them. Of all households, 53.7% were married-couple households, 17.9% were households with a male householder and no spouse or partner present, and 23.8% were households with a female householder and no spouse or partner present. About 25.7% of all households were made up of individuals and 14.1% had someone living alone who was 65 years of age or older.

There were 3,104 housing units, of which 30.7% were vacant. The homeowner vacancy rate was 1.8% and the rental vacancy rate was 10.2%.

Racial composition as of the 2020 census
Race	Number	Percent
White	4,421	79.6%
Black or African American	40	0.7%
American Indian and Alaska Native	12	0.2%
Asian	77	1.4%
Native Hawaiian and Other Pacific Islander	2	0.0%
Some other race	472	8.5%
Two or more races	533	9.6%
Hispanic or Latino (of any race)	1,029	18.5%

=== 2000 census ===
At the 2000 census there were 4,265 people, 1,660 households, and 1,133 families in the CDP. The population density was 414.2 inhabitants per square mile (159.9/km^{2}). There were 2,465 housing units at an average density of 239.4 per square mile (92.4/km^{2}). The racial makeup of the CDP was 95.26% White, 0.70% African American, 0.07% Native American, 0.70% Asian, 0.02% Pacific Islander, 0.96% from other races, and 2.27% from two or more races. Hispanic or Latino of any race were 5.39%.

Of the 1,660 households 31.9% had children under the age of 18 living with them, 57.0% were married couples living together, 7.3% had a female householder with no husband present, and 31.7% were non-families. 24.9% of households were one person and 9.6% were one person aged 65 or older. The average household size was 2.57 and the average family size was 3.08.

The age distribution was 24.2% under the age of 18, 6.1% from 18 to 24, 29.8% from 25 to 44, 27.0% from 45 to 64, and 12.9% 65 or older. The median age was 39 years. For every 100 females, there were 98.3 males. For every 100 females age 18 and over, there were 97.8 males.

The median household income was $57,441 and the median family income was $67,734. Males had a median income of $50,652 versus $37,115 for females. The per capita income for the CDP was $28,551. About 3.5% of families and 5.4% of the population were below the poverty line, including 6.4% of those under age 18 and 2.2% of those age 65 or over.

== Notable people ==
- Laura Branigan, musician
- Vince Iannone, YouTuber known as "Vince Aesthetic"
