= Riverhead (CDP), New York =

Riverhead, New York
- Hamlet and census-designated place Town Seat of Riverhead; County Seat of Suffolk County
- Downtown Riverhead from the air in 2025

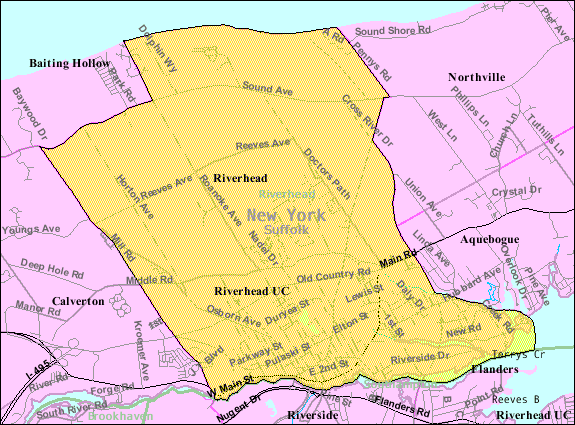

- Location on Long Island Location within the state of New York
- Coordinates: 40°55′1″N 72°39′45″W
- Country: United States
- State: New York
- County: Suffolk
- Town: Riverhead
- Named for: Its location at the mouth of the Peconic River

Area
  - Total: 16.83 sq mi (43.58 km^{2})
  - Land: 15.09 sq mi (39.09 km^{2})
  - Water: 1.73 sq mi (4.49 km^{2})
- Elevation: 13 ft (4 m)

Population (2020)
  - Total: 14,993
  - Density: 993.4/sq mi (383.54/km^{2})
- Time zone: UTC-5 (Eastern (EST))
  - Summer (DST): UTC-4 (EDT)
- ZIP code: 11901
- Area codes: 631, 934
- FIPS code: 36-61973

Riverhead (historically spelled River Head) is a hamlet and census-designated place (CDP) located within the Town of Riverhead in Suffolk County, on the North Fork of Long Island, in New York, United States. It is the town seat of the Town of Riverhead and the de jure county seat of Suffolk County. The population was 14,993 at the time of the 2020 census.

Situated at the mouth of the Peconic River, which empties into Peconic Bay where the North and South Forks of Long Island split, the hamlet is the official county seat of Suffolk County. In the 1960s, most of the county offices moved to the CDP of Hauppauge in the towns of Islip and Smithtown in the more populous western half of the county – a move which still spurs attempts for the town of Riverhead to lead the way for the secession of the five easternmost towns in the county to form Peconic County.

== History ==
The hamlet began with the Suffolk County Court House, a 1727 structure built to serve both the North and South Forks. Since that year, Riverhead (at the time known as "River Head") has served as the seat of Suffolk County, and still contains the primary courts of the region.

Riverhead's downtown area formed as an active commercial hub during the 19th century. In the beginning of the 20th century, the community saw an influx of Polish immigrants, as did the rest of the town. This led to the creation of Polish Town, where the popular Polish Town Fair is held annually. The downtown experienced urban blight during the mid-20th century, but recovered by the beginning of the 21st century.

== Geography ==
According to the United States Census Bureau, the CDP has a total area of 15.4 square miles (40 km^{2}), of which 15.1 square miles (39 km^{2}) is land and 0.4 square miles (1.0 km^{2}), or 2.33%, is water.

=== Climate ===
The portion of the CDP facing Long Island Sound has a humid subtropical climate (Cfa) while the southern portion has a hot-summer humid continental climate (Dfa). The hardiness zones are 7a and 7b.

Climate data for Riverhead Research Farm, New York (1991–2020 normals, extremes 1938–present)
Month	Jan	Feb	Mar	Apr	May	Jun	Jul	Aug	Sep	Oct	Nov	Dec	Year
Record high °F (°C)	68 (20)	68 (20)	83 (28)	92 (33)	96 (36)	98 (37)	100 (38)	99 (37)	98 (37)	91 (33)	80 (27)	76 (24)	100 (38)
Mean daily maximum °F (°C)	39.7 (4.3)	41.3 (5.2)	48.3 (9.1)	59.8 (15.4)	70.2 (21.2)	78.6 (25.9)	83.9 (28.8)	82.3 (27.9)	75.7 (24.3)	64.9 (18.3)	54.0 (12.2)	44.9 (7.2)	62.0 (16.7)
Daily mean °F (°C)	32.9 (0.5)	34.1 (1.2)	40.5 (4.7)	50.7 (10.4)	60.6 (15.9)	69.6 (20.9)	75.4 (24.1)	74.2 (23.4)	68.0 (20.0)	57.2 (14.0)	47.0 (8.3)	38.4 (3.6)	54.0 (12.2)
Mean daily minimum °F (°C)	26.0 (−3.3)	26.9 (−2.8)	32.7 (0.4)	41.5 (5.3)	51.0 (10.6)	60.6 (15.9)	66.9 (19.4)	66.1 (18.9)	60.2 (15.7)	49.5 (9.7)	40.0 (4.4)	31.9 (−0.1)	46.1 (7.8)
Record low °F (°C)	−8 (−22)	−6 (−21)	8 (−13)	18 (−8)	31 (−1)	39 (4)	47 (8)	45 (7)	34 (1)	24 (−4)	17 (−8)	−2 (−19)	−8 (−22)
Average precipitation inches (mm)	3.79 (96)	3.31 (84)	4.72 (120)	4.08 (104)	3.60 (91)	3.82 (97)	3.05 (77)	3.93 (100)	4.07 (103)	4.46 (113)	3.81 (97)	4.58 (116)	47.22 (1,199)
Average precipitation days (≥ 0.01 in)	10.2	8.4	9.7	10.6	11.0	9.0	8.2	8.1	8.0	8.8	8.6	10.7	111.3
Source: NOAA

== Demographics ==
Historical population
Census	Pop.	Note	%±
2000	10,513		—
2010	13,299		26.5%
2020	14,993		12.7%
U.S. Decennial Census

As of the census of 2010, there were 13,299 people. The racial makeup of the CDP was 74.6% White, (55.9% Not Hispanic or Latino), 18.5% African American/Black, 23.5% Hispanic or Latino (of any race), 1.4% Asian American, and 1.2% Two or More Races.

As of the census of 2000, there were 10,513 people, 3,878 households, and 2,547 families residing in the CDP. The population density was 696.5 inhabitants per square mile (268.9/km^{2}). There were 4,167 housing units at an average density of 276.1 units per square mile (106.6 units/km^{2}). The racial makeup of the CDP was 89.98% white, 2.82% black or African American, 0.55% Native American, 1.13% Asian, 0.08% Pacific Islander, 2.15% from other races, and 2.29% from two or more races. Hispanic or Latino of any race were 2.03% of the population.

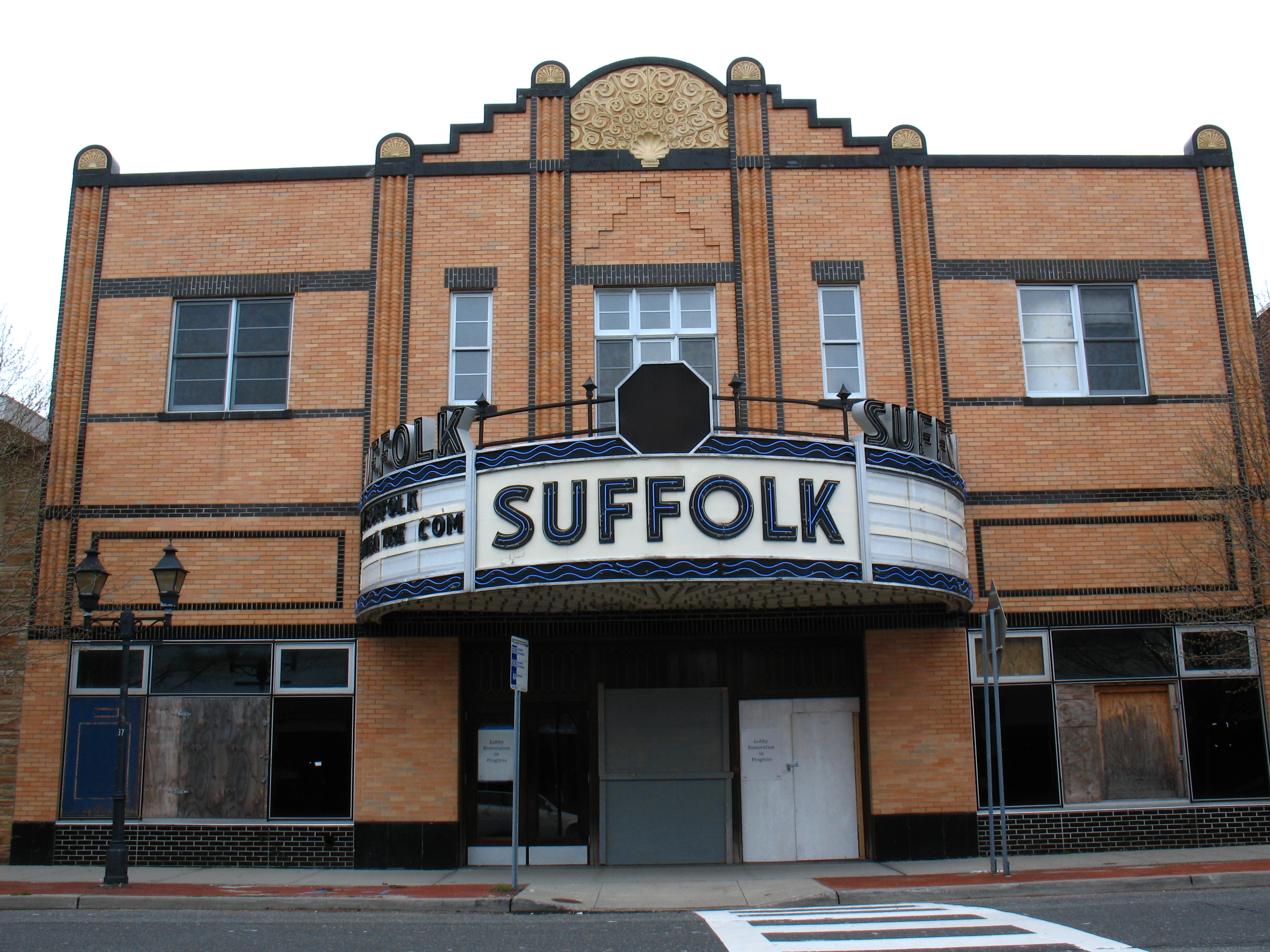
The Suffolk Theatre, a performing arts venue in a 1933 movie house

There were 3,878 households, out of which 29.4% had children under the age of 18 living with them, 44.0% were married couples living together, 16.8% had a female householder with no husband present, and 34.3% were non-families. 27.5% of all households were made up of individuals, and 15.4% had someone living alone who was 65 years of age or older. The average household size was 2.57 and the average family size was 3.09.

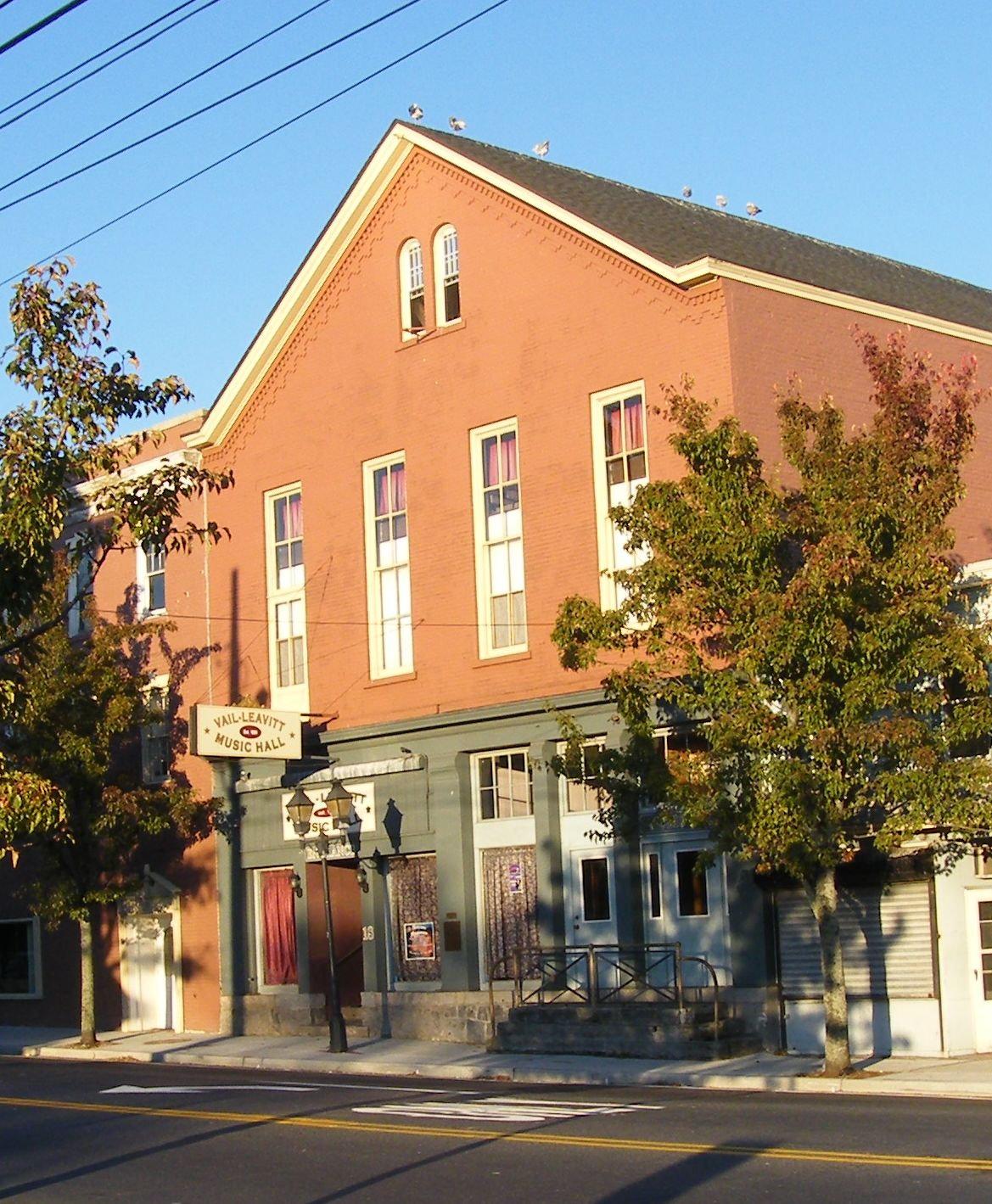
The Vail-Leavitt Music Hall, an 1881 theatrical venue

In the CDP, the population was spread out, with 24.1% under the age of 18, 7.6% from 18 to 24, 27.9% from 25 to 44, 21.1% from 45 to 64, and 19.3% who were 65 years of age or older. The median age was 39 years. For every 100 females, there were 90.9 males. For every 100 females age 18 and over, there were 87.2 males.

The median income for a household in the CDP was $35,330, and the median income for a family was $39,672. Males had a median income of $35,707 versus $28,021 for females. The per capita income for the CDP was $17,746. About 9.2% of families and 13.0% of the population were below the poverty line, including 16.7% of those under age 18 and 9.2% of those age 65 or over.

== Economy ==
The hamlet contains the principal downtown area in the Town of Riverhead and one of the largest in Suffolk County. Outside of this downtown area are rural sections which contain both active farms and residential developments.

== Media ==
The Riverhead newspaper Riverhead News-Review, dates back to 1950, when the Harry Lee Publishing Co. Inc, publishers of The County Review (1903–1950), purchased The Riverhead News (1868–1950) and consolidated the two newspapers as The News-Review. Times/Review Newspapers Corp. purchased The News-Review and The Suffolk Times, based in Greenport, in 1977.

The news website RiverheadLOCAL began publication in 2010. It is owned by East End Local Media Corp., an independent company based in Riverhead.

Radio stations WBZO, WRCN-FM, WRIV and W215BT are licensed to Riverhead. Independent television station WLNY-TV (channel 55) is also licensed to Riverhead and owned by CBS News and Stations, with operations being run from the CBS Broadcast Center in Manhattan with WCBS-TV. WCBS-TV (DRT channel 22), a broadcast relay station, is also licensed to Riverhead.

== Education ==
- Riverhead Central School District
- Suffolk County Community College – Eastern Campus

== Transportation ==
=== Road ===
Major roads within the hamlet include:

- New York State Route 25 – New York City, Orient Point
- County Route 58 (Suffolk County, New York)
- County Route 105 (Suffolk County, New York)
- Sound Avenue

=== Rail ===
The Long Island Rail Road's Main Line (Greenport Branch) provides limited service at the Riverhead station, offering service between Ronkonkoma to the west and Greenport to the east. At Ronkonkoma, passengers can connect to New York City-bound electric trains.

=== Bus ===
Riverhead is served by the following Suffolk County Transit routes:

- 58: Brentwood LIRR station - Riverhead via New York State Route 25
- 62: Smith Haven Mall - Riverhead LIRR station
- 66: Patchogue LIRR station - Riverhead
- 80: Riverhead Tanger Outlets - Riverhead LIRR station
- 92: Orient Point - East Hampton LIRR station
- Long Island Express Hicksville, New York – Riverhead LIRR

In addition, the hamlet is also served by Hampton Jitney's North Fork route.

== See also ==
- Hauppauge, New York
- Mineola, New York
