= Westhampton, New York =

- Hamlet and census-designated place
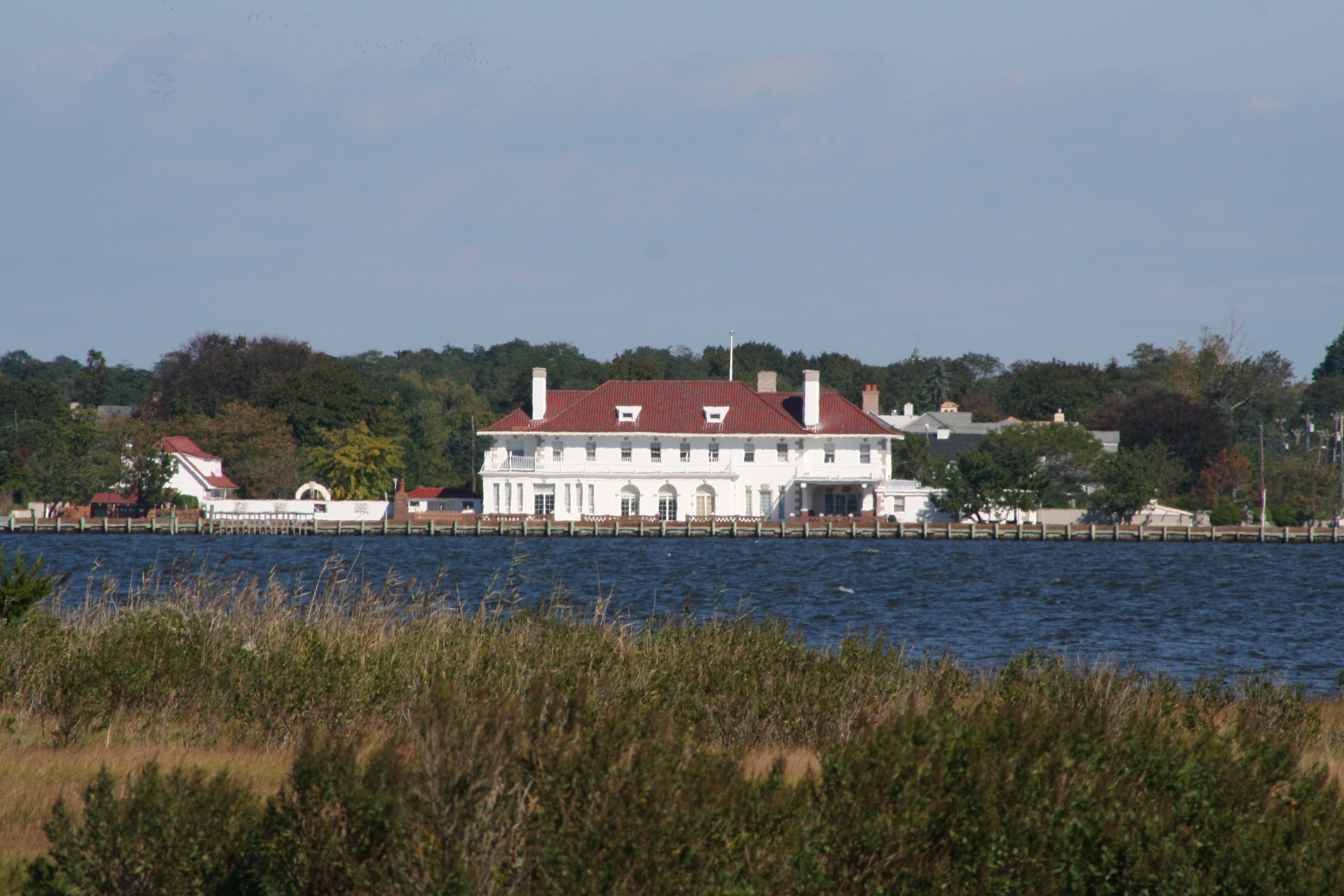
- Inland waterway in Westhampton

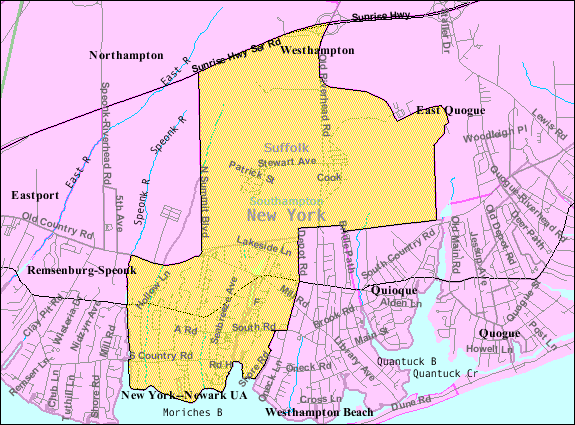

- Location within New York
- Coordinates: 40°49′22″N 72°39′52″W
- Country: United States
- State: New York
- County: Suffolk

Area
  - Total: 14.85 sq mi (38.47 km^{2})
  - Land: 12.64 sq mi (32.75 km^{2})
  - Water: 2.21 sq mi (5.72 km^{2})
- Elevation: 36 ft (11 m)

Population (2020)
  - Total: 3,621
  - Density: 286.4/sq mi (110.57/km^{2})
- Time zone: UTC-5 (Eastern (EST))
  - Summer (DST): UTC-4 (EDT)
- ZIP code: 11977
- Area code: 631
- FIPS code: 36-80170
- GNIS feature ID: 0970920

Westhampton is a hamlet and census-designated place (CDP) in Suffolk County, New York, United States. As of the 2020 census, Westhampton had a population of 3,621.

Westhampton is in the Town of Southampton.

== Geography ==
Westhampton is located at 40°49′22″N 72°39′52″W (40.822894, -72.664306).

According to the United States Census Bureau, the CDP has a total area of 14.9 square miles (38.5 km^{2}), of which 12.7 square miles (32.8 km^{2}) is land and 2.2 square miles (5.7 km^{2}), or 14.74%, is water.

=== Climate ===
Westhampton has an oceanic climate (Cfb) under the Köppen climate classification, with moderately cold winters and warm summers. The plant hardiness is more similar to a humid continental climate (Dfb) although winter days are mild enough that Westhampton is unlikely to maintain long-term snow cover in a normal winter. Due to the lack of an urban environment and being away from the immediate coastline, the area has much colder nights than New York City. Westhampton sees an average of 43.4 inches of precipitation per year.

Climate data for Westhampton, New York (Francis S. Gabreski Airport), 1991–2020 normals, extremes 1951–present
Month	Jan	Feb	Mar	Apr	May	Jun	Jul	Aug	Sep	Oct	Nov	Dec	Year
Record high °F (°C)	67 (19)	71 (22)	76 (24)	88 (31)	93 (34)	96 (36)	100 (38)	99 (37)	94 (34)	88 (31)	80 (27)	71 (22)	100 (38)
Mean maximum °F (°C)	56.7 (13.7)	55.3 (12.9)	64.8 (18.2)	75.0 (23.9)	82.4 (28.0)	88.8 (31.6)	93.1 (33.9)	90.6 (32.6)	84.9 (29.4)	77.6 (25.3)	67.1 (19.5)	61.0 (16.1)	94.8 (34.9)
Mean daily maximum °F (°C)	38.7 (3.7)	40.4 (4.7)	46.8 (8.2)	56.6 (13.7)	66.2 (19.0)	75.4 (24.1)	81.3 (27.4)	80.3 (26.8)	73.6 (23.1)	63.4 (17.4)	53.3 (11.8)	44.5 (6.9)	60.0 (15.6)
Daily mean °F (°C)	29.4 (−1.4)	30.6 (−0.8)	37.2 (2.9)	46.1 (7.8)	55.9 (13.3)	65.6 (18.7)	71.9 (22.2)	70.8 (21.6)	63.7 (17.6)	52.9 (11.6)	43.5 (6.4)	35.2 (1.8)	50.2 (10.1)
Mean daily minimum °F (°C)	20.0 (−6.7)	20.9 (−6.2)	27.6 (−2.4)	35.6 (2.0)	45.6 (7.6)	55.8 (13.2)	62.5 (16.9)	61.4 (16.3)	53.9 (12.2)	42.5 (5.8)	33.7 (0.9)	25.8 (−3.4)	40.4 (4.7)
Mean minimum °F (°C)	−1.7 (−18.7)	2.8 (−16.2)	9.2 (−12.7)	20.3 (−6.5)	29.0 (−1.7)	39.6 (4.2)	49.5 (9.7)	47.6 (8.7)	38.0 (3.3)	25.7 (−3.5)	15.7 (−9.1)	8.1 (−13.3)	−3.4 (−19.7)
Record low °F (°C)	−15 (−26)	−12 (−24)	−9 (−23)	11 (−12)	24 (−4)	33 (1)	42 (6)	39 (4)	32 (0)	16 (−9)	6 (−14)	−1 (−18)	−15 (−26)
Average precipitation inches (mm)	3.19 (81)	2.72 (69)	4.28 (109)	3.79 (96)	3.31 (84)	3.50 (89)	2.88 (73)	3.74 (95)	3.75 (95)	4.65 (118)	3.48 (88)	4.17 (106)	43.46 (1,104)
Average snowfall inches (cm)	8.4 (21)	9.5 (24)	7.5 (19)	0.9 (2.3)	0.0 (0.0)	0.0 (0.0)	0.0 (0.0)	0.0 (0.0)	0.0 (0.0)	0.0 (0.0)	0.8 (2.0)	6.8 (17)	33.9 (85.3)
Average precipitation days (≥ 0.01 in)	10.5	10.1	10.7	11.9	13.6	11.1	9.5	9.7	10.2	12.0	10.5	11.0	130.8
Average snowy days (≥ 0.1 in)	4.6	4.5	3.7	0.4	0.0	0.0	0.0	0.0	0.0	0.0	0.3	3.4	16.9
Source: NOAA (mean maxima/minima 1998–2020, snow/snow days 1951–1969)

== Demographics ==
Historical population
Census	Pop.	Note	%±
2000	2,689		—
2010	3,079		14.5%
2020	3,621		17.6%
U.S. Decennial Census

=== Racial and ethnic composition ===
Westhampton CDP, New York – Racial and ethnic composition Note: the US Census treats Hispanic/Latino as an ethnic category. This table excludes Latinos from the racial categories and assigns them to a separate category. Hispanics/Latinos may be of any race.
Race / Ethnicity (NH = Non-Hispanic)	Pop 2000	Pop 2010	Pop 2020	% 2000	% 2010	% 2020
White alone (NH)	2,505	2,504	2,737	87.31%	81.33%	75.59%
Black or African American alone (NH)	124	109	80	4.32%	3.54%	2.21%
Native American or Alaska Native alone (NH)	6	7	4	0.21%	0.23%	0.11%
Asian alone (NH)	35	35	45	1.22%	1.14%	1.24%
Native Hawaiian or Pacific Islander alone (NH)	0	1	0	0.00%	0.03%	0.00%
Other race alone (NH)	0	5	24	0.00%	0.16%	0.66%
Mixed race or Multiracial (NH)	42	38	77	1.46%	1.23%	2.13%
Hispanic or Latino (any race)	157	380	654	5.47%	12.34%	18.06%
Total	2,869	3,079	3,621	100.00%	100.00%	100.00%

=== 2020 census ===
As of the 2020 census, Westhampton had a population of 3,621. The median age was 48.3 years. 19.0% of residents were under the age of 18 and 27.1% were 65 years of age or older. For every 100 females there were 97.5 males, and for every 100 females age 18 and over there were 95.1 males age 18 and over.

82.4% of residents lived in urban areas, while 17.6% lived in rural areas.

There were 1,291 households in Westhampton, of which 27.9% had children under the age of 18 living in them. Of all households, 57.4% were married-couple households, 16.6% were households with a male householder and no spouse or partner present, and 19.8% were households with a female householder and no spouse or partner present. About 20.9% of all households were made up of individuals and 12.1% had someone living alone who was 65 years of age or older.

There were 2,206 housing units, of which 41.5% were vacant. The homeowner vacancy rate was 1.8% and the rental vacancy rate was 10.9%.

=== 2000 census ===
As of the census of 2000, there were 2,869 people, 1,070 households, and 766 families residing in the CDP. The population density was 326.2 inhabitants per square mile (125.9/km^{2}). There were 1,601 housing units at an average density of 182.0 per square mile (70.3/km^{2}). The racial makeup of the CDP was 91.04% White, 4.43% African American, 0.28% Native American, 1.25% Asian, 0.80% from other races, and 2.20% from two or more races. Hispanic or Latino of any race were 5.47% of the population.

There were 1,070 households, out of which 37.9% had children under the age of 18 living with them, 58.7% were married couples living together, 8.9% had a female householder with no husband present, and 28.4% were non-families. 23.0% of all households were made up of individuals, and 7.6% had someone living alone who was 65 years of age or older. The average household size was 2.66 and the average family size was 3.14.

In the CDP, the population was spread out, with 26.6% under the age of 18, 7.1% from 18 to 24, 30.3% from 25 to 44, 25.5% from 45 to 64, and 10.6% who were 65 years of age or older. The median age was 37 years. For every 100 females, there are 100.3 males. For every 100 females age 18 and over, there were 97.1 males.

The median income for a household in the CDP was $67,125, and the median income for a family was $80,313. Men had a median income of $51,331 versus $36,875 for women. The per capita income for the CDP was $31,894. About 3.4% of families and 4.5% of the population were below the poverty line, including 3.7% of those under age 18 and 9.0% of those age 65 or over.

== Notable persons ==
- Howard Cosell, 20th-century television sports journalist.

Maria Bartiromo of Fox News owns a beach house in Westhampton.
