= Riverside, Suffolk County, New York =

Riverside, New York
- Hamlet and census-designated place
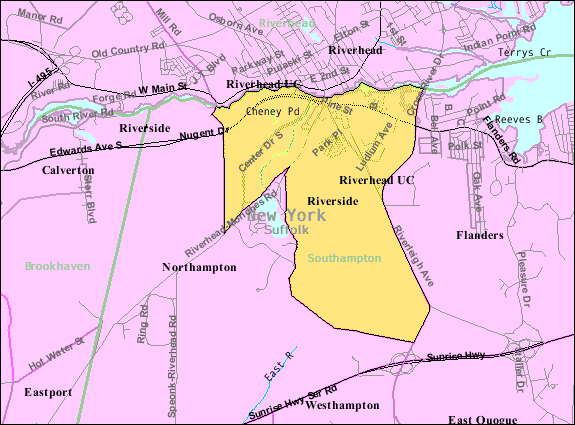
- U.S. Census map of Riverside.

- Location within the state of New York.
- Coordinates: 40°54′28″N 72°39′45″W
- Country: United States
- State: New York
- County: Suffolk
- Town: Southampton

Area
  - Total: 2.75 sq mi (7.11 km^{2})
  - Land: 2.64 sq mi (6.85 km^{2})
  - Water: 0.10 sq mi (0.26 km^{2})

Population (2020)
  - Total: 2,882
  - Density: 1,089.0/sq mi (420.45/km^{2})
- Time zone: UTC-5 (Eastern (EST))
  - Summer (DST): UTC-4 (EDT)
- ZIP code: 11901
- Area codes: 631, 934
- FIPS code: 36-62066

Riverside is a hamlet and census-designated place (CDP) in Suffolk County, New York, United States. The population was 2,911 at the 2010 census.

Riverside is in the Town of Southampton and derives its name from being on the south bank of the Peconic River.

== Geography ==
According to the United States Census Bureau, the CDP has a total area of 2.8 square miles (7.3 km^{2}), of which 2.7 square miles (7.0 km^{2}) is land and 0.12 square miles (0.3 km^{2}), or 4.00%, is water.

== Demographics ==
Historical population
Census	Pop.	Note	%±
2020	2,882		—
U.S. Decennial Census

At the 2000 census, there were 2,875 people, 846 households and 485 families residing in the CDP. The population density was 563.4 inhabitants per square mile (217.5/km^{2}). There were 926 housing units at an average density of 181.5 per square mile (70.1/km^{2}). The racial makeup of the CDP was 59.10% White, 35.58% African American, 1.08% Native American, 0.73% Asian, 1.36% from other races, and 2.16% from two or more races. Hispanic or Latino of any race were 9.67% of the population.

There were 846 households, of which 20.6% had children under the age of 18 living with them, 36.8% were married couples living together, 16.7% had a female householder with no husband present, and 42.6% were non-families. 36.5% of all households were made up of individuals, and 22.0% had someone living alone who was 65 years of age or older. The average household size was 2.25 and the average family size was 2.90.

14.5% of the population were under the age of 18, 13.0% from 18 to 24, 36.3% from 25 to 44, 18.3% from 45 to 64, and 17.8% who were 65 years of age or older. The median age was 37 years. For every 100 females, there were 144.9 males. For every 100 females age 18 and over, there were 151.2 males.

The median household income was $28,208 and the median family income was $35,724. Males had a median income of $27,857 compared with $28,103 for females. The per capita income for the CDP was $13,428. About 20.0% of families and 21.0% of the population were below the poverty line, including 30.0% of those under age 18 and 10.7% of those age 65 or over.
