= List of county routes in Suffolk County, New York (51–75) =

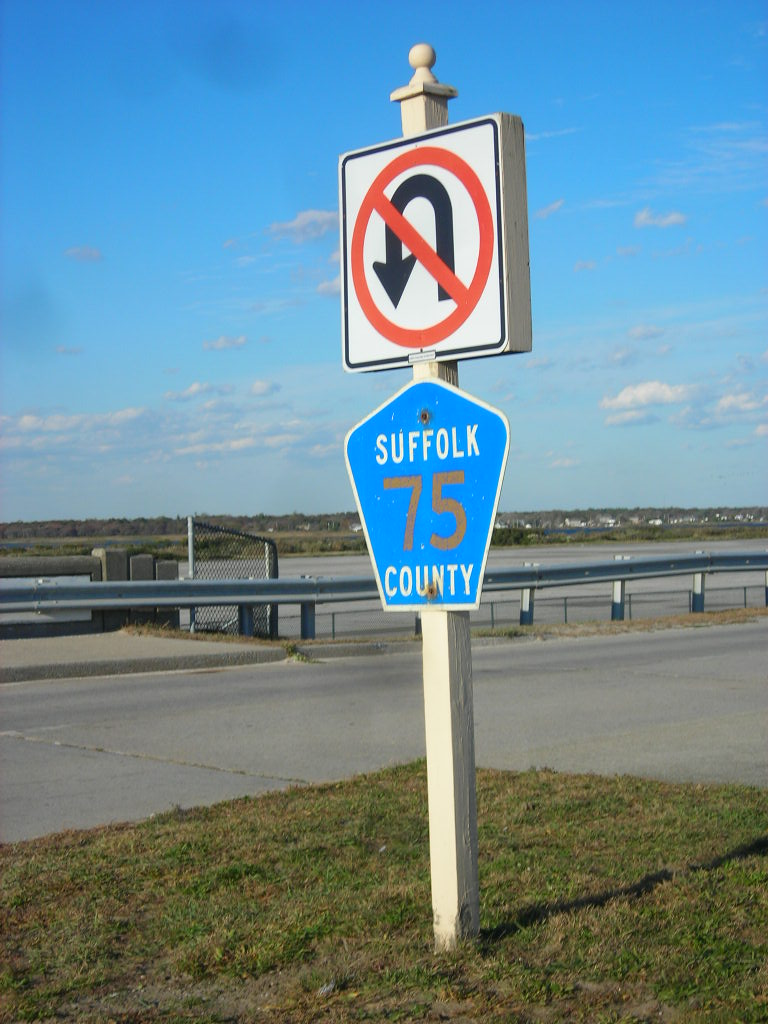
- CR 75 signage along Fire Island Beach Road

Highway names
- Interstates: Interstate X (I-X)
- US Highways: U.S. Route X (US X)
- State: New York State Route X (NY X)
- County: County Route X (CR X)

System links
- New York Highways; Interstate; US; State; Reference; Parkways

County routes in Suffolk County, New York, are maintained by the Suffolk County Department of Public Works and signed with the Manual on Uniform Traffic Control Devices-standard yellow-on-blue pentagon route marker. The designations do not follow any fixed pattern. Routes 51 to 75 are listed below.

== County Route 51 ==
County Route 51
- Location: East Moriches–Riverside
- Length: 8.46 mi (13.62 km)
- Existed: 1933–present

County Route 51 is a major road running southwest-to-northeast from CR 80 to NY 24 and CR 94 in Riverside.

Route description

The road begins at CR 80 (Montauk Highway) just east of the eastern terminus of CR 98 (Frowein Road). The route runs along the west side of two local airports (Lufker Airport and Spadaro Airport) where it also crosses the former right-of-way for the Manorville Branch of the Long Island Rail Road. At NY 27 (Sunrise Highway), CR 51 is one of the roads served by the incomplete exit 61. The other one is CR 55, which served as part of NY 27 until Sunrise Highway was extended east of the interchange. CR 51 became the northern terminus of CR 55 in the 1980s.

The road continues northeast through the hills of the Long Island Pine Barrens. Soon thereafter, CR 51 reaches the intersection of Speonk–Riverhead Road (former CR 88), which leads to the Suffolk County Community College eastern campus. Northeast of that point, the road literally starts to go downhill.

At Wildwood Lake, there is an incomplete at-grade interchange with CR 63 (Lake Avenue), which used to be part of East Moriches–Riverhead Road. From there, the road runs north through Cranberry Bog County Park. It curves northeast again at a plot of land that was originally intended to be the southern terminus of CR 103 (Cedar Swamp Road), then enters a series of Suffolk County Government buildings, where it finally terminates at an at-grade intersection at NY 24 and CR 94 in Riverside.

Major intersections

Location	mi	km	Destinations	Notes
East Moriches	0.00	0.00	CR 80 (Montauk Highway) – East Moriches, Eastport	Southern terminus; former NY 27A
Eastport	1.30	2.09	NY 27 – New York, Montauk	No northbound access to NY 27 west; exit 61 on NY 27
Eastport	1.60	2.57	CR 55 south (Eastport Manor Road) to NY 27 – Manorville	Northern terminus of CR 55; former NY 27
Eastport	2.30	3.70	CR 111 north to I-495 (Long Island Expressway) – Manorville	Interchange
Northampton	5.60	9.01	Speonk–Riverhead Road (CR 88 south) – Speonk, Remsenburg	Serves LIU Riverhead and SCCC East
Riverside	6.90	11.10	CR 63 north – Northampton, Wildwood Lake	No southbound exit; southern terminus of CR 63
Riverside	8.50	13.68	CR 94 (NY 24) to I-495 / NY 25 – Calverton, Hampton Bays	Northern terminus; modified roundabout
1.000 mi = 1.609 km; 1.000 km = 0.621 mi: Incomplete access

== County Route 52 ==
County Route 52
- Location: Tuckahoe
- Length: 0.88 mi (1,420 m)
- Existed: 1935–present

County Route 52 is a short two-lane road called Sandy Hollow Road and is a divided highway with at least one turning ramp only at both ends. The road serves as a connecting route between NY 27/CR 39 and CR 38.

Major intersections

The entire route is in Tuckahoe.

mi	km	Destinations	Notes
0.00	0.00	NY 27 west / CR 39 west	
0.88	1.42	CR 38 (North Sea Road) – North Sea, Noyack, Southampton	
1.000 mi = 1.609 km; 1.000 km = 0.621 mi: Incomplete access

== County Route 53 ==
County Route 53
- Location: Bay Shore
- Existed: c. 1967-1973

County Route 53 was Clinton Avenue in Bay Shore. Today it serves as a southbound only suffixed route of CR 13, known as CR 13A south from the intersection of Reil Place. North of this intersection, Clinton Avenue is a string of roads running parallel to Fifth Avenue maintained by the town of Islip. The CR 53 designation was removed in 1973.

== County Route 54 ==
County Route 54
- Location: Calverton–Wading River
- Length: 1.02 mi (1.64 km)
- Existed: 1935–present

NY 352 ca. 1931 - 1938

County Route 54 is mainly Hulse Landing Road, a two-lane road that runs north and south Wading River.

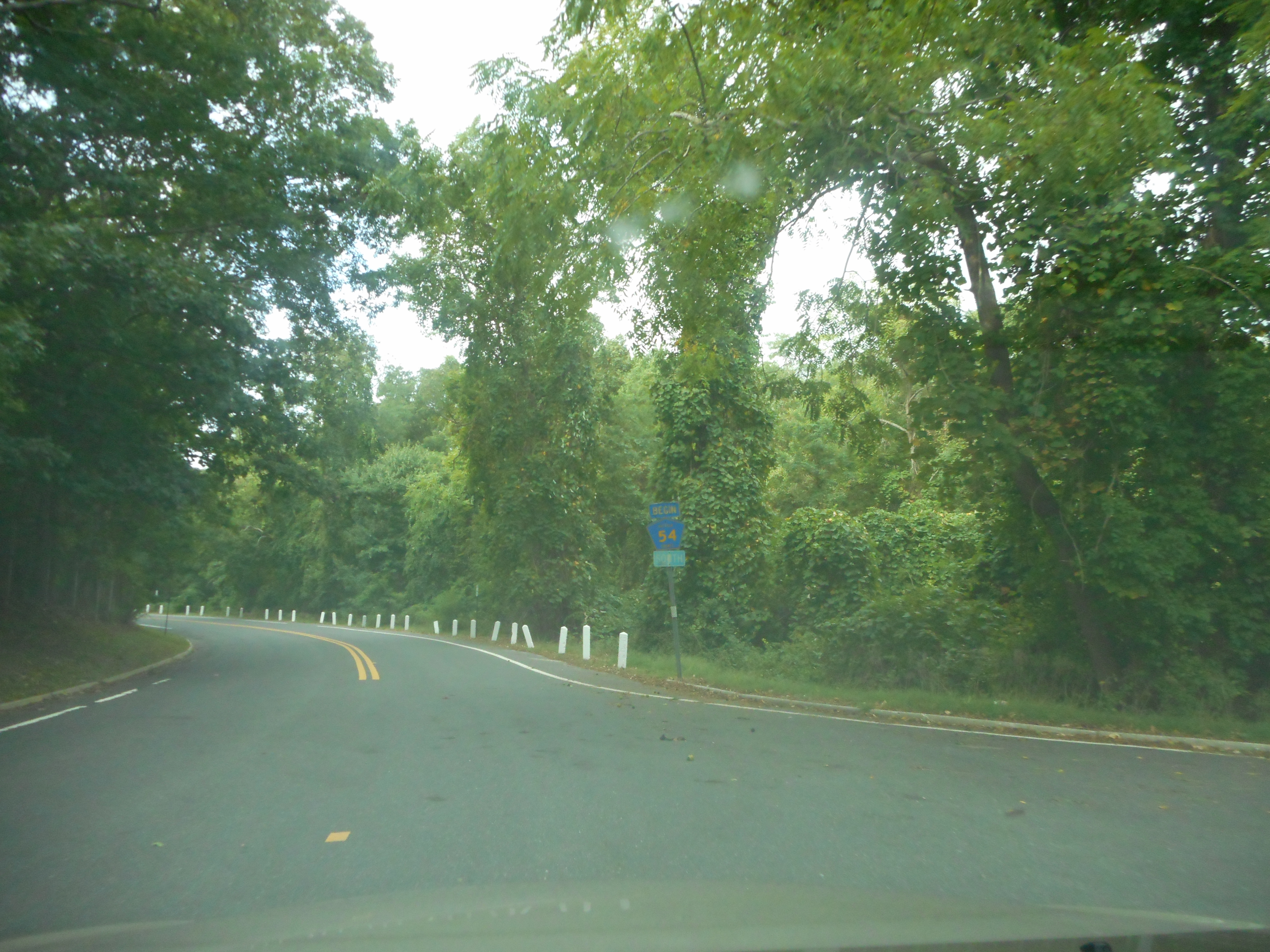
The northern terminus of CR 54 at the wye at Wildwood State Park.

The route begins at Sound Avenue in Wading River, with Hulse Landing Road continuing south from the intersection. The road passes by a Wading River Fire Department depot and several businesses within the housing it passes through.

Though Hulse Landing Road heads straight north toward Old North Country Road along the western border of Wildwood State Park, CR 54 curves northeast into Wildwood Road, the southern entrance of the park.

Although there was signage at the southern terminus of Hulse Landing road at NY 25A, the portion of CR 54 between Sound Avenue and 25A has been decommissioned.

The road formerly began at NY 25A near land formerly owned by the Calverton Naval Weapons Industrial Reserve Plant. Between NY 25A and Sound Avenue the formerly proposed Nugent Drive Extension was supposed to cross over CR 54 at an interchange. The Nugent Drive Extension was intended to serve as the relocated NY 25A. Sound Avenue was to be transformed into a dead end street west of former CR 54. Today, the land intended to be used for the road is now part of a housing development.

The portion of CR 54 north of Sound Avenue was designated as NY 352 from c. 1931 to c. 1938. CR 54 was also designated as NY 254 at some point during the 1930's and 1940's.

Major intersections

The entire route is in Wading River.

Location	mi	km	Destinations	Notes
0.00	0.00	Sound Avenue	Former NY 25A	
1.02	1.64	North Wading River Road – Wildwood State Park	West entrance	
1.000 mi = 1.609 km; 1.000 km = 0.621 mi

== County Route 55 ==
County Route 55
- Location: Eastport
- Length: 1.0 mi (1.6 km)
- Existed: 1935–present

County Route 55 is a short county road in Suffolk County, New York, located in and around Eastport known as Eastport–Manor Road, and sometimes Eastport–Manorville Road. It runs north and south from CR 80 (Montauk Highway, formerly NY 27A) to CR 51 north of Eastport.

History

As the name implies, the road originally went from Manorville to Eastport, and was acquired by the Suffolk County Department of Public Works in 1935. The section between Montauk Highway and CR 71 (Old Country Road) was once part of Montauk Highway itself. When Sunrise Highway terminated at exit 61, NY 27 took a right turn along a temporary concurrency with CR 55 until it reached Montauk Highway, and continued eastward toward Montauk.

Construction of the vast and complex exit 61 interchange forced the realignment of CR 55, as well as Head of the Neck Road. When CR 111 was built between the Long Island Expressway and Sunrise Highway during the 1970s, it replaced Eastport–Manorville Road north of the road's current terminus towards the L.I.E. However, Suffolk County Planning Department wanted to build a new extension of CR 55 north of CR 111 leading to the Grumman Calverton Airport. An interchange with the expressway was also supposed to have been built. Neither of these proposals were ever accepted.

CR 55 was truncated to East Moriches–Riverhead Road in 1986, and the rest of Eastport–Manor Road fell under the jurisdiction of the Town of Brookhaven. This section is the home to the Shrine of Our Lady of The Island.

Major intersections

Location	mi	km	Destinations	Notes
Eastport	0.00	0.00	CR 80 (Montauk Highway)	Former NY 27A
Eastport	0.30	0.48	CR 71 (Old Country Road)	
Eastport	0.80	1.29	To NY 27 – New York, Montauk	Access via service roads between exits 61 and 62
Eastport	1.00 0.00	1.61 0.00	CR 51 – East Moriches, Riverhead	End county maintenance
Manorville	2.10	3.38	CR 111 / Montauk Avenue	Former northern terminus
1.000 mi = 1.609 km; 1.000 km = 0.621 mi

== County Route 56 ==
County Route 56
- Location: Yaphank–Shirley
- Length: 2.20 mi (3.54 km)
- Existed: 1960–present

County Route 56 is a bi-directional frontage road along NY 27 known as Victory Avenue. It stretches from CR 16 between Sunrise Highway and CR 21 and ends at William Floyd Parkway, however Victory Avenue extends east of the CR 56 designation. At one time, it also included Horseblock Road east of Waverly Avenue in Farmingville.

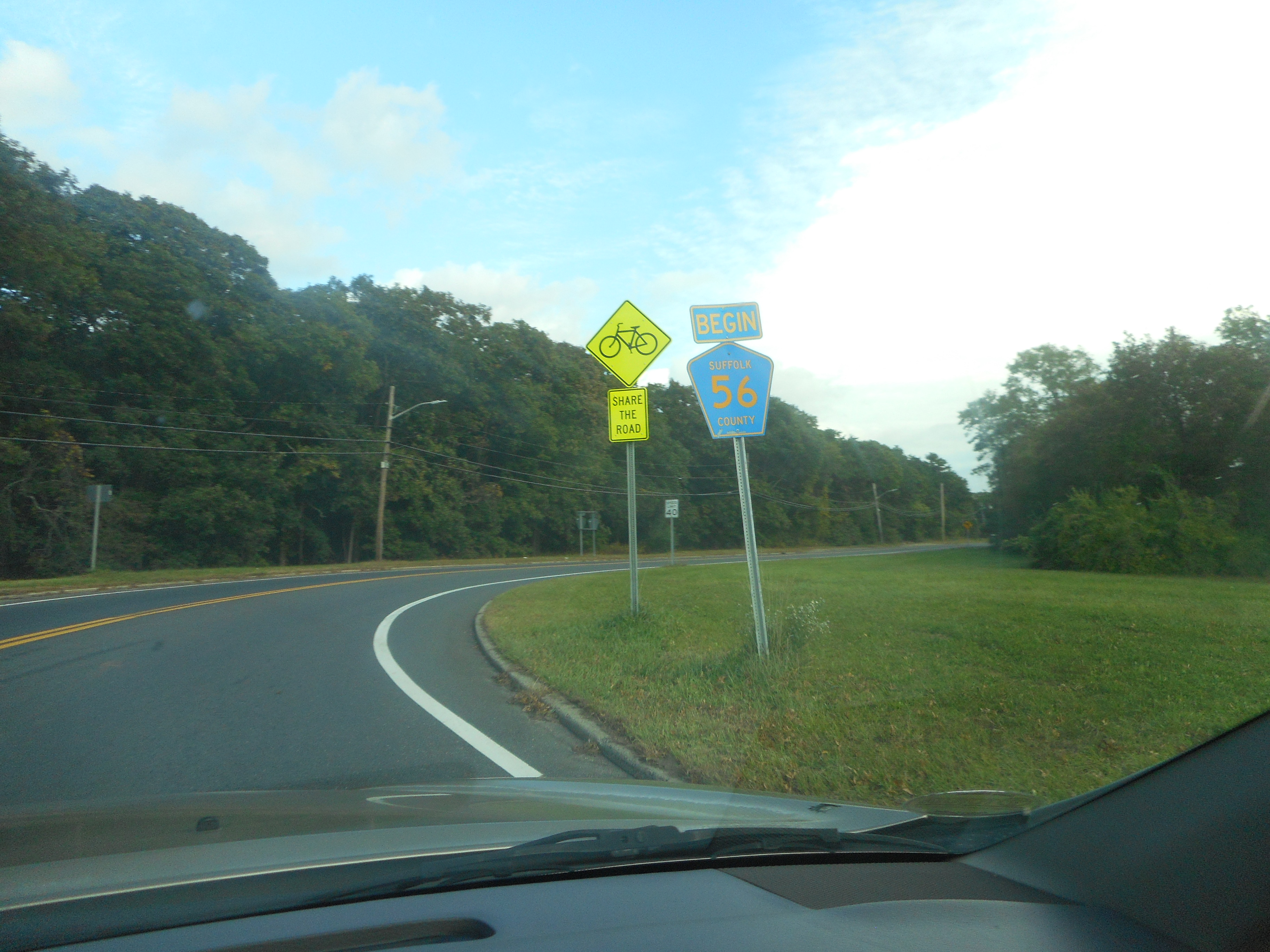
The beginning of CR 56 east of CR 16 at the interchange with NY 27.

CR 56 provides the entrance to Southaven County Park along Carmans River, and the median of Sunrise Highway near this section contains a pine tree lined median in front of those entrances. The setting along these roads is similar to the one on the Southern State Parkway west of Belmont Lake State Park. After the intersection of River Road, a westbound on-ramp to Sunrise Highway, which was originally built with two different access points.

East of the William Floyd Parkway interchange, Victory Boulevard remains a two-lane bi-directional frontage road for Sunrise Highway, but this section is a Town of Brookhaven maintained road. It skirts along the south end of the runway for Brookhaven Airport west of Winters Drive, and goes as far east as Barnes Road in Moriches.

Major intersections

Location	mi	km	Destinations	Notes
Yaphank	0.00	0.00	NY 27 / CR 16 (Horseblock Road) / CR 21 (Yaphank Avenue)	Western terminus; exit 57N on NY 27
Shirley	1.70	2.74	NY 27 west	Exit 58N on NY 27
Shirley	2.20	3.54	NY 27 east / CR 46 (William Floyd Parkway)	Eastern terminus
1.000 mi = 1.609 km; 1.000 km = 0.621 mi

== County Route 57 ==
County Route 57
- Location: Deer Park–Bay Shore
- Length: 4.8 mi (7.7 km)
- Existed: 1935–present

County Route 57 runs mostly east and west from NY 231 in Deer Park to NY 27A in downtown Bay Shore. It includes Bay Shore Road, Howell's Road, and Third Avenue.

Route description

No sooner does CR 57 start at NY 231 in a sharp southeasterly direction, does it encounter Carl’s Path and CR 4 (Commack Road). The intersection of Weeks Road is where the road crosses the Babylon–Islip Town Line, the southeastern angle of the road levels off, and was where the Babylon–Northport Expressway was intended to cross over, with a possible interchange. CR 82's northern terminus is at CR 57, however Udall's Road continues north of this terminus as a town of Islip Street. Howell's Road is cut off by the interchange with the Southern State Parkway and Robert Moses Causeway. Originally it crossed Bay Shore Road, then moved along the south side and intersected with Bay Shore Road again along with Muncey Road.

At the intersection of Muncey Road, CR 57 moves from Bay Shore Road to Howell's Road. From there it becomes the northern border of the village of Brightwaters. Eastbound and westbound carriageways are separated by two different underpasses beneath the interchange with NY 27 (Sunrise Highway), both of which briefly join the service roads. When the eastbound and westbound lanes merge again, the first site the encounter is The John Thomas Inne on the southeast corner of Howell's Road and the eastbound service road. At Manatuck Boulevard, the Brightwaters village line moves from the north side of CR 57 to the south side, but still runs along the road until Clinton Avenue, where CR 57 leaves Brightwaters just west of the intersection of CR 13. CR 57 turns south onto Third Avenue, where it crosses CR 50, and finally terminates at NY 27A in downtown Bay Shore.

Major intersections

Location	mi	km	Destinations	Notes
Deer Park	0.00	0.00	NY 231 (Deer Park Avenue)	
Deer Park	0.30	0.48	CR 4 (Commack Road)	
West Islip	1.70	2.74	CR 82 south (Udall Road)	Northern terminus of CR 82
West Islip	2.20	3.54	Southern State Parkway / Robert Moses Causeway south – New York, East Islip	Robert Moses Causeway not signed; exit 41 on Southern State Parkway
Brightwaters	3.20	5.15	NY 27	Roundabout with service roads; exit 42 on NY 27
Bay Shore	3.70	5.95	CR 13 (Fifth Avenue) – Fire Island Ferries	
Bay Shore	4.50	7.24	CR 50 (Union Boulevard)	
Bay Shore	4.80	7.72	NY 27A (Montauk Highway)	
1.000 mi = 1.609 km; 1.000 km = 0.621 mi

== County Route 57A ==
County Route 57A
- Location: Bay Shore
- Existed: 1935–1967

County Route 57A was the former designation for Third Avenue south of Howell's Road towards NY 27A in Bay Shore. It became part of CR 57.

== County Route 57B ==
County Route 57B
- Location: Bay Shore–North Bay Shore
- Existed: 1935–1967

County Route 57B was the former designation for Third Avenue north of Howell's Road to either Sunrise Highway eastbound service road, or possibly as far north as CR 13 and Brook Avenue. The road was decommissioned and is now maintained by the town of Islip.

== County Route 58 ==
County Route 58
- Location: Calverton–Riverhead
- Length: 4.4 mi (7.1 km)
- Existed: 1936–present

County Route 58, locally known as Old Country Road, serves as a northern bypass of the section of NY 25 that runs through the downtown area of Riverhead. Built through what were once relatively desolate fields, the road is now home to several large shopping centers and big box stores, and as such, has become, at least on the weekends, even more choked than the road it is supposed to bypass.

Route description

The highway starts at the sprawling junction of NY 25 and I-495, as a four-lane divided highway. The western split between NY 25 and CR 58 is entirely grade-separated with turnarounds in the median. This was built in conjunction with the interchanges with the Long Island Expressway at exits 72 and 73. After the incomplete interchange with I-495 (which would have been expanded when I-495 was extended eastward), the road quickly narrows to four lanes with a center-turn lane as it passes the large Tanger Outlet Center complex, which was built during the 1990s.

Continuing eastward, the road alternates between three lanes and four lanes, always with a center turn lane. The portion of the road between the outlet center and the traffic circle at CR 73 has been the site of the most active retail development, spread over several decades. As such, the road's width and treatment vary because the task of widening largely fell to each individual developer of the new strip malls. Of course, the area is now very congested, particularly because the number of traffic lights on the road has increased from six in 1990 to 13 in 2007.

After the traffic circle at CR 73, the road continues for the rest of its length with only two lanes plus the center-turn lane. It terminates at NY 25 northeast of the town of Riverhead.

Major intersections

Location	mi	km	Destinations	Notes
Calverton	0.00	0.00	NY 25	Western terminus
Calverton	0.60	0.97	I-495 west – New York	Interchange; westbound exit and eastbound entrance; eastern terminus and exit 73 on I-495
Community of Riverhead	3.10	4.99	CR 73 (Roanoke Avenue)	Roundabout
Community of Riverhead	3.90	6.28	CR 43 (Northville Turnpike)	
Community of Riverhead	4.40	7.08	NY 25 – Greenport, Orient, Riverhead	Eastern terminus
1.000 mi = 1.609 km; 1.000 km = 0.621 mi: Incomplete access

== County Route 59 ==
County Route 59
- Location: East Hampton–East Hampton North
- Length: 1.2 mi (1.9 km)

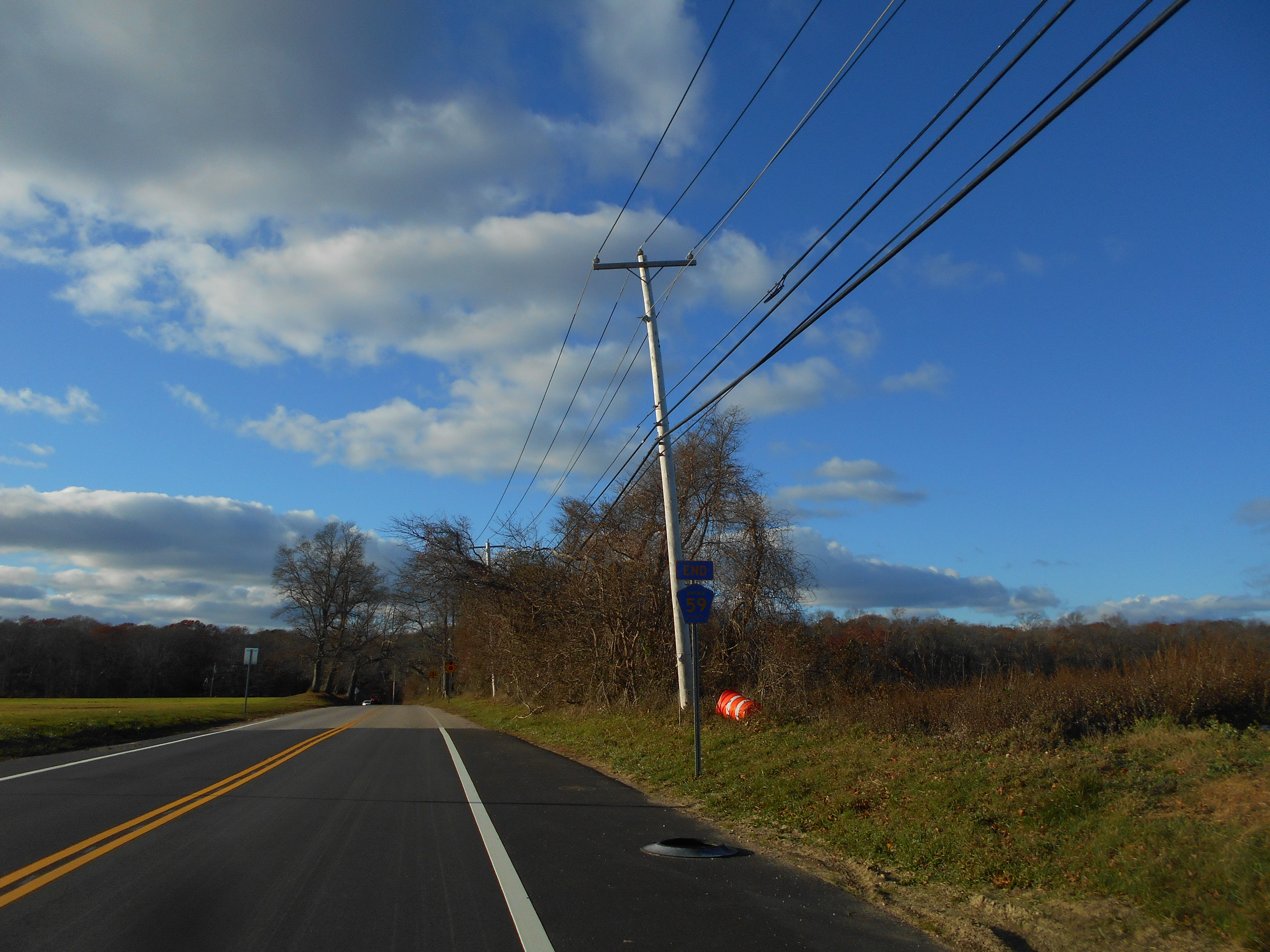
CR 59 near Stephen Hands Path

County Route 59 is Long Lane in the town of East Hampton. It was once proposed to be extended and serve as a realigned section of NY 114.

Major intersections

Location	mi	km	Destinations	Notes
Village of East Hampton	0.00	0.00	Newtown Lane south	Continues south without designation to NY 27
East Hampton North	1.20	1.93	Stephen Hands Path (CR 113) / Two Holes of Water Road north	Continues north without designation
1.000 mi = 1.609 km; 1.000 km = 0.621 mi

== County Route 60 ==
County Route 60
- Location: Noyack–North Haven
- Length: 1.7 mi (2.7 km)
- Existed: 1970s–present

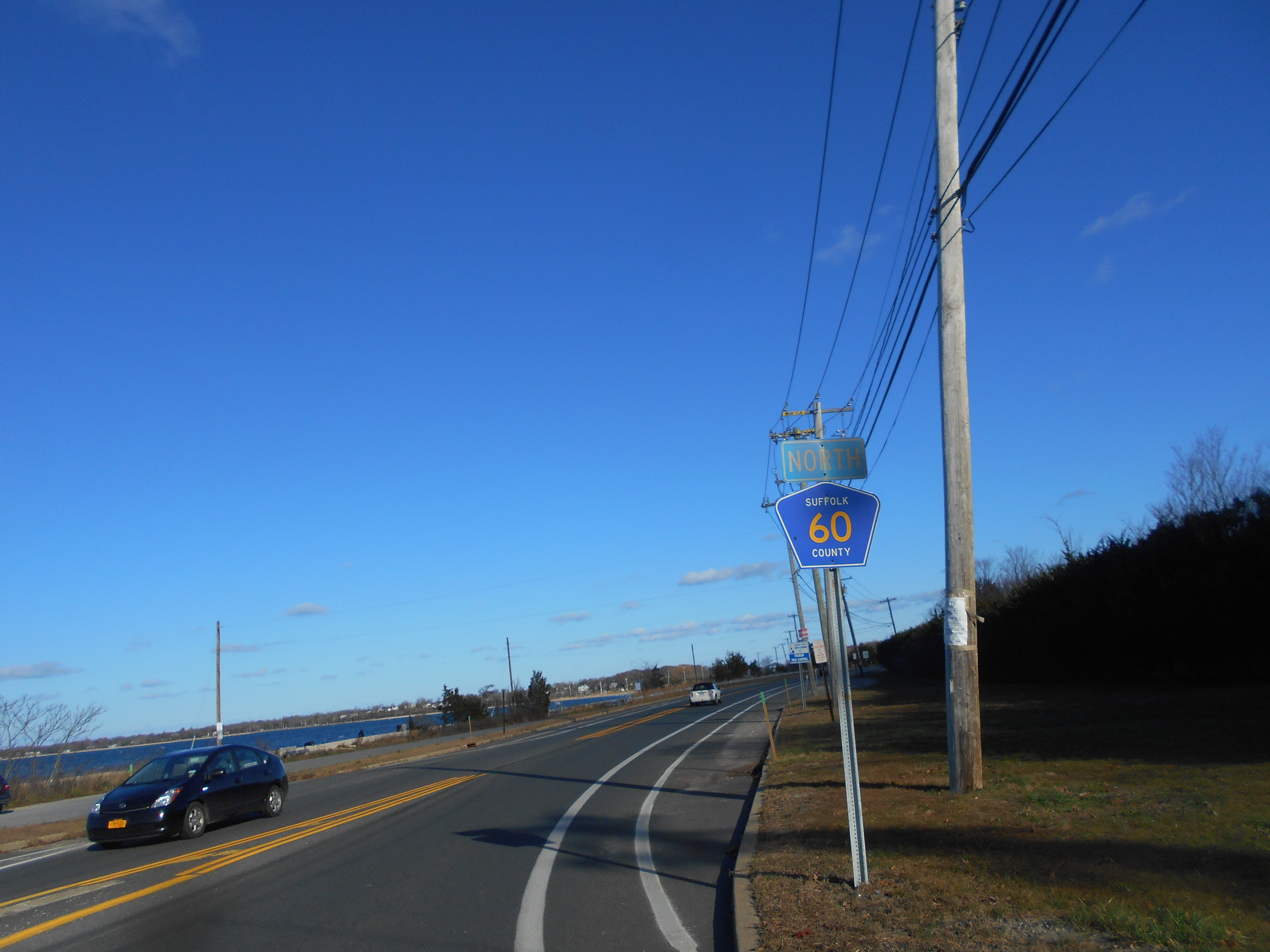
CR 60 in Noyack

County Route 60 is a county road formerly known as CR 38A. It is a pair of two-lane roads (Noyack–Long Beach Road and Short Beach Road) that run along the peninsula connecting Noyack with North Haven.

Noyack–Long Beach Road was previously known as Long and Short Beach Highway. CR 60 begins at an at-grade interchange with CR 38 in Noyack between Noyac Bay and Payne's Creek. It narrows down to a two-lane undivided highway which runs on a peninsula, with a parallel park access road on the north side and a bicycle lane on the south side. The western interchange indicates a potential proposal to widen the road to a possible four-lane divided highway that was never built.

The peninsula ends in North Haven, where Noyack–Long Beach Road becomes Short Beach Road at Third Street. CR 60 ends at a traffic circle at NY 114 and Tyndall Road, although NY 114 continues in the same direction as Short Beach Road until it curves to the north and reaches the South Ferry Port to Shelter Island.

Major intersections

Location	mi	km	Destinations	Notes
Noyack	0.00	0.00	Noyac Road	Modified traffic circle; former CR 38
North Haven	1.70	2.74	NY 114 / Tyndall Road – Sag Harbor, North Haven, Shelter Island	Traffic circle
1.000 mi = 1.609 km; 1.000 km = 0.621 mi

== County Route 61 ==
County Route 61
- Location: Holtsville–Farmingville
- Length: 3.5 mi (5.6 km)
- Existed: 1975–present

County Route 61 is unsigned Waverly Avenue, a mainly two-lane road that runs north and south along the Islip–Brookhaven town line until the town line makes a sharp left along the Greenport Branch of the Long Island Rail Road.

Route description

CR 61 begins at CR 19, in the town of Brookhaven where that section of Waverly Avenue becomes Patchogue–Holbrook Road, and Log Road becomes a dead end street. From here, road takes a northeasterly turn and straightens out along the Islip–Brookhaven town line. CR 61 is the last interchange along Woodside Avenue (CR 99) before its western terminus at Patchogue–Holbrook Road. Access is only available from Woodside Avenue; however this interchange also includes an underpass for a driveway to the Holtsville I.R.S. office. Further north, motorists will encounter the southern terminus of Blue Point Road, which until the town of Islip allowed development on the west side of the road in the mid-20th century, actually reached Blue Point.

The last intersection within range of the town of Islip is for Furrow Roads (eastern terminus of CR 90) and Barretts Avenue, both of which were once intended to be integrated into the Central Suffolk Highway. Before the grade crossing of the Main Line of the Long Island Rail Road, a driveway for the former site of the Holtsville train station, can be found on the right side, while the Islip–Brookhaven town line takes a left turn to follow the tracks into Ronkonkoma, and Lakeland. After this crossing, Waverly Avenue immediately crosses Long Island Avenue, which until the mid-1970s terminated at Waverly Avenue, forcing westbound motorists to make a right turn and then a left onto Union Avenue across from the Holtsville Fire Department.

Waverly Avenue crosses over the Long Island Expressway with no access other than to the service roads. However, until CR 97 (Nicolls Road) was extended to the Long Island Expressway, it served as one of the eastbound destinations for exit 62. On the northeast corner of the westbound service road is the Waverly Avenue Elementary School. The remainder of CR 61 is residential and wooded. Due to the lack of county route shields, CR 61 ends unceremoniously at CR 16 (Horseblock Road), east of where CR 16 moves from the eastern terminus of Portion Road onto Horseblock Road. North of Horseblock Road, a town maintained extension of Waverly Avenue curves through the hills of a housing development towards College Road, at the former intersection with Highview Drive, a partial dirt road that had street name signs years after being closed off.

Major intersections

Location	mi	km	Destinations	Notes
Holtsville	0.00	0.00	CR 19 (Patchogue–Holbrook Road)	
Holtsville	0.30	0.48	CR 99	Interchange; off-ramps from CR 99 only
Holtsville	1.90	3.06	Furrows Road west / Barrets Avenue east (CR 90)	
Holtsville	2.50	4.02	To I-495	Access via service roads
Farmingville	3.50	5.63	CR 16 (Horseblock Road)	
1.000 mi = 1.609 km; 1.000 km = 0.621 mi: Incomplete access

== County Route 62 ==
County Route 62
- Location: Hampton Bays
- Length: 0.9 mi (1,400 m)
- Existed: 1936–present

County Route 62 can be found on the west side of the Shinnecock Canal along Newtown Road north of Montauk Highway and partially into Sunset Avenue at the Shinnecock County Marina. The entire route is in the hamlet of Hampton Bays.

Route description

CR 62 begins as Newtown Road at a divided section of Montauk Highway (CR 80) and is the last intersection on the highway before it crosses the Shinnecock Canal. Access to CR 62 is available from both directions on Montauk Highway, but traffic entering it can only do so from a south to westbound ramp that may have been a former segment of Montauk Highway itself. A U-turn ramp exists for north to westbound traffic. The road then passes by some town of Southampton parkland, and then an 11-foot-7-inch (3.53 m) bridge beneath the Montauk Branch of the Long Island Rail Road. Further north, a local street named Gate Street leads to the only street that runs closer to the canal than Newtown Road does.

Like CR 39B on the east side of the canal, CR 62 runs beneath the Sunrise Highway Bridge over the canal, but has no access to that road. After passing by some marinas and shore front homes, CR 62 seems to terminate at a T-intersection, but in reality makes a right turn at that intersection onto Sunset Avenue. Newtown Road, on the other hand, continues northwest through part of the Shinnecock Indian Reservation along the coast of the Great Peconic Bay and then west along the south end of Squire Pond before the intersection of Squiretown Road which leads to CR 32 and the Ponquogue Bridge, and Red Creek Road, which runs along the bay again towards NY 24.

Major intersections

The entire route is in Hampton Bays.

mi	km	Destinations	Notes
0.00	0.00	CR 80 west (Montauk Highway)	Former NY 27A
0.60	0.97	Newtown Road	To CR 32
0.90	1.45	Shinnecock County Marina	Dead end
1.000 mi = 1.609 km; 1.000 km = 0.621 mi

== County Route 63 ==
County Route 63
- Location: Riverside–Riverhead
- Length: 1.6 mi (2.6 km)
- Existed: 1963–present

County Route 63 is a two-lane north–south highway that connects Riverside and NY 24 with Riverhead and NY 25. It is named Lake Avenue (formerly Old East Moriches–Riverhead Road) south of a roundabout with NY 24 and Peconic Avenue north of it. It has a posted 55 mph (89 km/h) speed limit for a majority of its length. The road begins at an intersection with CR 51 and heads northeast, roughly continuing the track of CR 51 while that road curves north onto Center Drive South. It passes the shores of Wildwood Lake and provides access to streets leading to homes along the north and east side of the lake. The road then intersects a roundabout, which forms the gateway into downtown Riverhead. Here, it links with CR 104, CR 94, and NY 24. The road then continues a short ways north via Peconic Avenue to terminate at an intersection with NY 25. The road is a former portion of CR 51, and the CR 63 designation was given to this section when CR 51 was shifted to the newly built Center Drive South.

Major intersections

Location	mi	km	Destinations	Notes
Riverside	0.0	0.0	CR 51 to NY 27 (Sunrise Highway) – Northampton, Wildwood Lake, South Shore	Southern terminus
Riverside	1.6	2.6	NY 24 / CR 94 west / CR 104 south to I-495 – Hampton Bays, Montauk, New York, Gabreski Airport, Westhampton, Quogue	Roundabout; eastern terminus of CR 94; northern terminus of CR 104
Community of Riverhead	1.8	2.9	NY 25 (Main Street)	Northern terminus
1.000 mi = 1.609 km; 1.000 km = 0.621 mi

== County Route 64 ==
County Route 64
- Location: Bellport–Coram
- Length: 8.8 mi (14.2 km)
- Existed: 1998–present

County Route 64 is the unsigned designation for Bellport Avenue, and Station Road from the village of Bellport to Coram–Yaphank (Mill) Road and for Coram–Yaphank Road from Bellport Avenue to NY 112 since 1998. In the 1960s it was applied to Dunes Road–not to be confused with CR 89 in Westhampton Beach–near Meschutt Park at the Shinnecock Canal. On October 30, 1975 it was applied to Long Island Avenue (also known as Patchogue Road) between CR 101 and CR 21 on the north side of the Long Island Expressway in Yaphank.

Major intersections

Location	mi	km	Destinations	Notes
Bellport	0.00	0.00	South Country Road (CR 36)	Former routing of Montauk Highway
North Bellport	1.20	1.93	CR 80 (Montauk Highway)	Former NY 27A
North Bellport	2.20	3.54	NY 27 – New York	Exit 64 on NY 27
North Bellport	2.90	4.67	Woodside Avenue (CR 99)	
Medford–Yaphank line	3.70	5.95	Sills Road (CR 101)	
Medford–Yaphank line	3.90	6.28	CR 16 (Horseblock Road) – Ronkonkoma, Smithtown, New York	
Medford–Yaphank line	4.60	7.40	Long Island Avenue	Former designation of CR 64
Medford–Yaphank line	4.80	7.72	To I-495	Access via service roads
Coram	8.80	14.16	Grant Smith Road north	Northern terminus in the vicinity of NY 25 and NY 112
1.000 mi = 1.609 km; 1.000 km = 0.621 mi

== County Route 65 ==
County Route 65
- Location: Sayville–Patchogue
- Length: 4.8 mi (7.7 km)
- Existed: 1937–present

County Route 65 is primarily Middle Road from Sayville to Patchogue, where it includes Atlantic Avenue, Weeks Street, River Avenue, and Division Street. In the late 1990s, Middle Road was converted into a one-way street between Main Street and Foster Avenue, forcing Foster Avenue to become part of CR 65.

Route description

CR 65 begins as Middle Road at CR 85 (Main Street), although this section is only a one-way street until it reaches the first intersection at Collins Avenue, which is across the street from the NRHP-listed Sayville Congregational Church. The next intersection is Foster Avenue, which is the only two-way access to Montauk Highway. From here Middle Road passes by St. Anne's Episcopal Church, which was recently added to the National Register of Historic Places, and contains the St. Anne's Cemetery in the back. The road then runs through the Sans Soucci Lakes County Park, with a driveway to the NRHP-listed John Ellis Roosevelt Estate on the north side. East of the parkland, the road officially enters the hamlet of Bayport. The first intersection to pass for a major intersection within Bayport is McConnell Avenue. At the intersection with the two-lane divided Edgewater Avenue, CR 65 takes a northeasterly turn and serves as the southern border of Bayport Commons Park. Bayview Avenue is also across from this park, which ends just west of the intersection of Connetquot Road. Snedecor Avenue intersects Middle Road and is one of the few streets along the road to span from Montauk Highway to the Great South Bay, thus making it an important street by local standards.

One of the few areas of commercial zoning along the road is at the blinker-light intersection of Bayport Avenue, where Middle Road moves slightly to the southeast, only to return to the northeast before reaching Gillette Avenue. Shortly after this, CR 65 crosses the Islip–Brookhaven town line, where it enters the hamlet of Blue Point. In what will be a common pattern in the town of Brookhaven, Middle Road makes a sharp left turn to the north, then a right turn at the intersections of Humphrey Road (to the west) and Avery Lane (to the north). CR 65 then crosses a creek that's within a New York State Department of Environmental Conservation preserve area. Once the road exits this preserve, it intersects Land's End and Nelson Avenue, where it runs between two mansions, one of which is the St. Ursula Retreat Center on the southwest corner of the intersection with Blue Point Avenue. Blue Point Avenue and Middle Road has another set of blinker-lights, partially because it is a four-way stop intersection and partially because it is actually a pair of T-intersections set close to one another that requires a slight shift to the right for all traffic on Middle Road. After this fiasco, the road passes Bergen Avenue and makes a slight curve to the northeast, only to curve east again and cross the Corey's Creek Bridge, where one can find sites such as the Blue Point Marina, Corey's Creek Park, and a local roadside luncheonette.

Middle Road ends at Atlantic Avenue and CR 65 turns north onto Atlantic Avenue, until it reaches the intersection of Weeks Street, and turns back east again. From there, it crosses Tuthills Creek and enters the village of Patchogue, where it ends at River Avenue, and as Middle Road did with Atlantic Avenue, CR 65 turns north onto River Avenue. Just before River Avenue reaches the at-grade crossing with the Montauk Branch of the Long Island Rail Road, CR 65 turns east one last time at the intersection of Division Avenue, which runs directly along the south side of the tracks. Before crossing the Patchogue River, CR 65 move slightly away from the edge of the tracks, but not far enough away to be out of sight from the tracks. CR 65 ends at CR 19 (West Avenue). Consequently, CR 19's southern terminus is also at this intersection, but West Avenue continues south as a Patchogue Village street to Patchogue Bay. Likewise, Division Street east of CR 65 is also a village maintained street that continues eastward in front of Patchogue Railroad Station which spans the north side of Division Street between West Avenue and South Ocean Avenue. The road then become Baker Street at Patchogue Village Hall and finally terminates at Rider Avenue.

Major intersections

Location	mi	km	Destinations	Notes
Sayville	0.00	0.00	CR 85 (Montauk Highway)	Westbound access to CR 85 is via Foster Avenue; former NY 27A
Sayville	0.20	0.32	Foster Avenue	
Patchogue	4.80	7.72	CR 19 north (West Avenue)	Southern terminus of CR 19
1.000 mi = 1.609 km; 1.000 km = 0.621 mi: Incomplete access

== County Route 66 ==
County Route 66
- Location: Dix Hills
- Length: 1.0 mi (1.6 km)
- Existed: 1972–present

County Route 66 is Deer Park Road East in Dix Hills, serving as a connecting spur between NY 231 (via CR 35) and NY 25. Until 1972, it was designated CR 35B.

Route description

CR 66 begins at a wye intersection with CR 35, which at one time was also intended to include a North Deer Park Avenue Spur connecting to the Babylon–Northport Expressway. The only other major intersection between the two termini of CR 66 is a segment of DeForest Road which begins as the off-ramp of exit 42N of the Northern State Parkway. All other intersections at this point are residential streets. CR 66 ends at NY 25 in Elwood, just west of Elwood Road, where the interchange for the former Babylon–Northport Expressway was supposed to exist.

Major intersections

mi	km	Destinations	Notes
0.00	0.00	NY 231 south CR 35 ends	Continuation south; southern terminus of CR 35
0.00	0.00	Northern State Parkway – New York, Hauppauge	Exit 42N on Northern State Parkway
0.10	0.16	CR 35 north – Huntington	North end of CR 35 overlap
1.00	1.61	NY 25 east	Northern terminus
1.000 mi = 1.609 km; 1.000 km = 0.621 mi: Concurrency terminus

== County Route 67 ==
County Route 67
- Location: Dix Hills–Lake Ronkonkoma
- Length: 17.2 mi (27.7 km)

County Route 67 consists of part of Half Hollow Hills Road and all of the remaining segment of Long Island Motor Parkway that is still suitable for motor vehicles.

Major intersections

Location	mi	km	Destinations	Notes
Melville	0.00	0.00	CR 3 (Pinelawn Road)	
Melville	0.70	1.13	To I-495	Access via service roads
Dix Hills	2.60	4.18	Half Hollow Road east	Former CR 67A
Dix Hills	4.60	7.40	NY 231 (Deer Park Road) to I-495	
Dix Hills	7.00	11.27	Northern State Parkway east – Hauppauge	Eastbound Exit 43 on Northern Parkway
Commack	4.20	6.76	CR 4 (Commack Road) to Northern State Parkway west / CR 13 south	
Commack	7.50	12.07	Harned Road north (CR 14)	Southern terminus of CR 14
Brentwood	8.80	14.16	CR 7 south (Wicks Road) to I-495 west	Northern terminus of CR 7
Brentwood	9.90	15.93	To I-495 west	Access via westbound service road
Brentwood	10.60	17.06	CR 108 north to CR 6 north	Western terminus of concurrency with CR 108
Brentwood–Hauppauge hamlet line	10.70	17.22	I-495	Exit 55 on I-495
Hauppauge	11.10	17.86	Calebs Path south (CR 108) – Bethpage Ballpark	Eastern terminus of concurrency with CR 108
Hauppauge	11.90	19.15	NY 111 (Joshua's Path) – Bethpage Ballpark	
Hauppauge	12.10	19.47	CR 17 (Wheeler Road) – Bethpage Ballpark	
Islandia	13.40	21.57	I-495	Exit 57 on I-495
Islandia	13.80	22.21	NY 454 (Veterans Highway)	
Lake Ronkonkoma	17.20	27.68	CR 93 (Rosevale Avenue)	
1.000 mi = 1.609 km; 1.000 km = 0.621 mi: Incomplete access

== County Route 67A ==
County Route 67A
- Location: Melville–Half Hollow Hills
- Existed: 1960s

County Route 67A was originally Half Hollow Hills Road from Pinelawn Road to Motor Parkway, that served as an extension of CR 67. It was eventually decommissioned and merged into CR 67.

== County Route 68 ==
County Route 68
- Location: Stony Brook–Setuaket
- Length: 3.0 mi (4.8 km)

County Route 68 is an unsigned two-lane road that runs through historic Stony Brook along Main Street, Christian Avenue, and eventually into Setauket along Ridgeway Avenue, part of which was at one time part of NY 25A. The entire route is also shared with New York State Bicycle Route 25.

Route description

CR 68 begins as Main Street at NY 25A near the Stony Brook Museum and Carriage House, as a north–south road. It begins at a segment of NY 25A that briefly runs north and south within Stony Brook before making a sharp right turn towards Setauket, Port Jefferson and points east. A west-to-northbound ramp exists on the northeast corner of the intersection, When CR 68 runs through the Stony Brook village center, it turns into an east–west road. At a fork in the road with Hollow Road which heads southeast, CR 68 moves onto Christian Avenue and heads northeast. The rest of CR 68 is surrounded by historic houses, although it also includes the North Shore Montessori School and a local Methodist Church and Cemetery. From there it intersects the appropriately named Blinker Light Road and Cedar Street, which are less than five feet away from each other. Cedar Street heads toward The Stony Brook School and Stony Brook's train station, while CR 68 continues northeast into what is commonly referred to by mapmakers as "Old Stony Brook."

Christian Avenue continues northeast but CR 68 moves southeast onto Bailey Hollow Road, which ends at the intersection of Quaker Path Road, and becomes Ridgeway Avenue. Here, it also leaves Stony Brook and enters Setauket. The next major intersection is North Country Road to the south and Main Street to the north. The former connecting north-to-eastbound ramp which was used by eastbound NY 25A can still be seen on the southeast corner of North Country Road and Ridgeway Avenue. CR 68 then climbs a hill before ending at NY 25A just north of the formerly proposed Setauket–Port Jefferson Bypass.

Major intersections

Location	mi	km	Destinations	Notes
Stony Brook	0.00	0.00	NY 25A	
Setauket	2.60	4.18	North Country Road	Former NY 25A
Setauket	3.00	4.83	NY 25A	
1.000 mi = 1.609 km; 1.000 km = 0.621 mi

== County Route 69 ==
County Route 69
- Location: Shelter Island
- Length: 1.4 mi (2.3 km)

County Route 69 is the designation for the two-lane Cartwright Road on Shelter Island. The road begins at a traffic circle on NY 114; however, this designation only goes as far north as Ram Island Road.

Major intersections

The entire route is in Shelter Island.

mi	km	Destinations	Notes
0.00	0.00	NY 114 – Sag Harbor, Dering Harbor, Shelter Island Heights	Traffic circle
0.80	1.29	CR 117 west (Burns Avenue)	Eastern terminus of CR 117
1.40	2.25	Ram Island Road	To CR 37
1.000 mi = 1.609 km; 1.000 km = 0.621 mi

== County Route 70 ==
County Route 70
- Location: Montauk
- Length: 1.0 mi (1.6 km)

County Route 70 is Old West Lake Drive and formerly CR 77A. The road runs northwest from NY 27 along the southwest side of Montauk Lake before reaching CR 77.

Major intersections

The entire route is in Montauk.

mi	km	Destinations	Notes
0.00	0.00	CR 77 (West Lake Drive) / Fairview Avenue west	Continues west without designation
1.00	1.61	NY 27 (Montauk Point State Parkway)	
1.000 mi = 1.609 km; 1.000 km = 0.621 mi

== County Route 71 ==
County Route 71
- Location: Eastport–Westhampton Beach
- Length: 6.1 mi (9.8 km)
- Existed: 1942–present

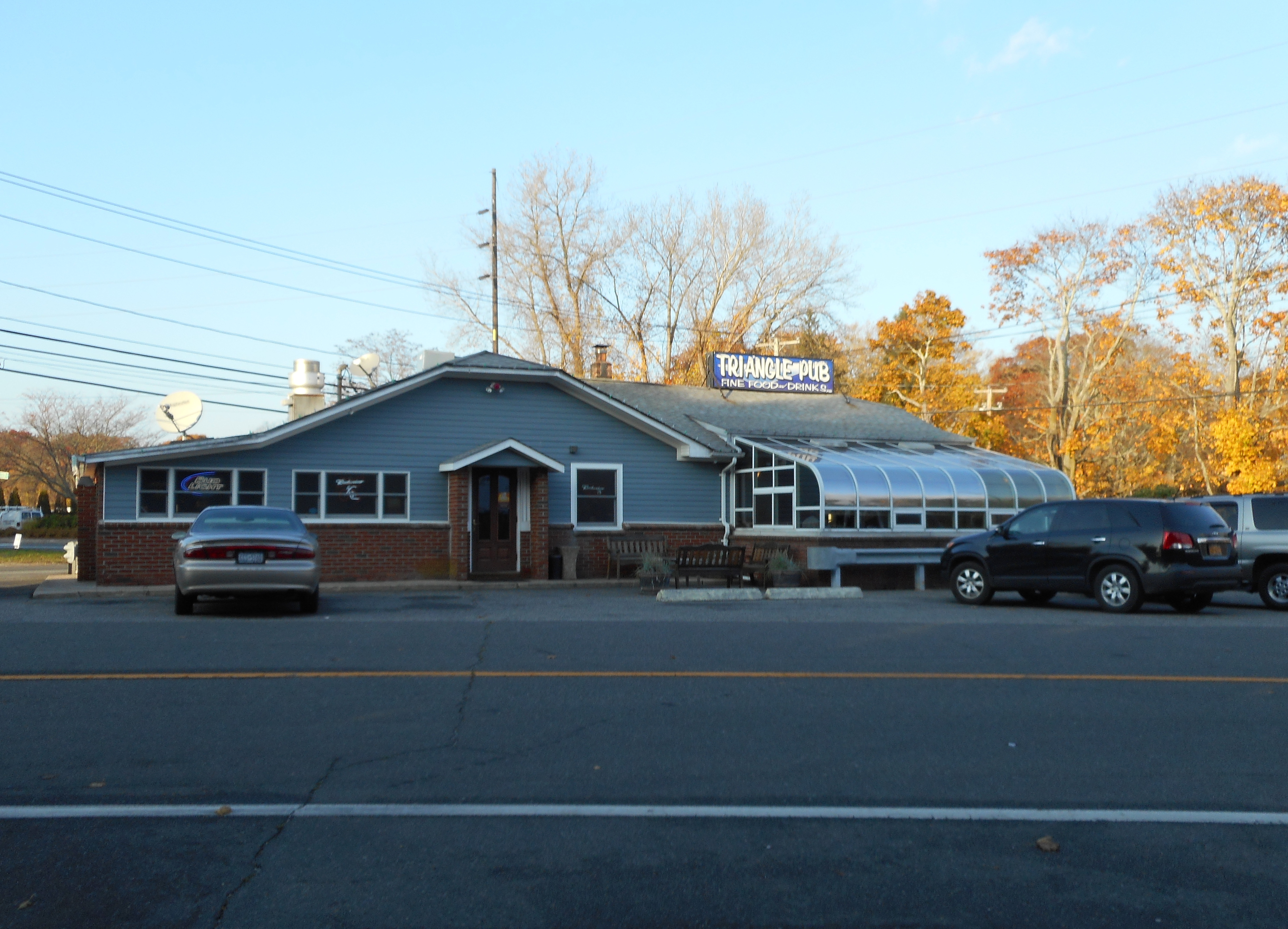
The turning ramp between CRs 71 and 55 that used to be part of Montauk Highway.

County Route 71 is also Old Country Road, but strictly in Eastport and the western town of Southampton. It is a former section of Montauk Highway. The last segment to be part of Montauk Highway was in Eastport from the current west end to CR 55 (Eastport–Manor Road). The right turn ramp from Old Country Road to Eastport–Manor Road is where eastbound Montauk Highway used to go.

The segment southeast of the railroad crossing at the Montauk Branch of the Long Island Rail Road in Westhampton was intended to be replaced by the formerly proposed Westhampton segment of the Port Jefferson–Westhampton Beach Highway.

Major intersections

Location	mi	km	Destinations	Notes
Eastport	0.00	0.00	CR 80 (Montauk Highway)	Western terminus; former NY 27A
Eastport	0.40	0.64	CR 55 (Eastport–Manor Road)	
Eastport			CR 80 Truck (North Bay Avenue)	Western end of CR 80 Truck concurrency
Speonk			CR 80 Truck (North Phillips Avenue)	Eastern end of CR 80 Truck concurrency
Speonk	2.70	4.35	Speonk–Riverhead Road (CR 88 north)	
Westhampton	4.70	7.56	CR 80 (Montauk Highway)	
Westhampton Beach	5.70	9.17	To NY 27	Roundabout; access via Potunk Lane
Westhampton Beach	6.10	9.82	Main Street	Eastern terminus
1.000 mi = 1.609 km; 1.000 km = 0.621 mi: Concurrency terminus

== County Route 72 ==
County Route 72
- Location: East Moriches
- Existed: 1973

County Route 72 was Atlantic Avenue in East Moriches until 1973. The road remains a north and south two-lane street that begins at West Cove near Moriches Bay then intersects with Moriches Avenue which leads to USCG Station East Moriches on Hart's Cove. It terminated at NY 27A (now CR 80), but Atlantic Avenue continues northbound into Pine Street, the former location of East Moriches Station. Pine Street crosses CR 98 (Moriches Bypass), then East Chapman Boulevard, before becoming a dead-end street at the right-of-way for the eastbound service road of NY 27, only to begin again on the other side on the westbound service road, cross the former LIRR Manorville Branch right-of-way, and end at Head of the Neck Road.

Major intersections

The entire route is in East Moriches, Suffolk County.

mi	km	Destinations	Notes
0.0	0.0	West Cove	Along Moriches Bay
		Moriches Avenue	Serves USCG Station East Moriches
		NY 27A	Now CR 80
1.000 mi = 1.609 km; 1.000 km = 0.621 mi

== County Route 73 ==
County Route 73
- Location: Riverhead
- Length: 4.1 mi (6.6 km)
- Existed: 1943–present

County Route 73 is Roanoke Avenue from downtown Riverhead north towards the farms along the Long Island Sound. Roanoke Avenue in Downtown Riverhead was originally part of CR 43 between NY 25 (Main Street) and Northville Turnpike. This segment was replaced in 1943, when CR 73 was established on Roanoke Avenue. In 1957, CR 73 was expanded to overlap CR 73A, which was eliminated in 1973.

Major intersections

The entire route is in the Community of Riverhead.

mi	km	Destinations	Notes
0.00	0.00	NY 25 west to I-495 west	
0.20	0.32	CR 43 north (Northville Turnpike)	Southern terminus of CR 43
1.30	2.09	CR 58 (Old Country Road)	Roundabout
4.10	6.60	Sound Avenue / Ronaoke Avenue north	Former routing of NY 25A; continues north without designation
1.000 mi = 1.609 km; 1.000 km = 0.621 mi

== County Route 73A ==
County Route 73A
- Location: Riverhead–Roanoke
- Existed: 1943–1973

County Route 73A was Roanoke Avenue north of the Old Country Road traffic circle. It was eventually integrated into part of CR 73.

== County Route 74 ==
County Route 74
- Location: Amagansett–Napeague
- Length: 2.1 mi (3.4 km)

County Route 74 was the unmarked Abrahams Landing Road and Bendigo Road from near NY 27 at the Amagansett train station past the Devon Yacht Club north of Napeague Bay, to Cranberry Hole Road (CR 33). It was intended to be reassigned to the Promised Land Road Extension, a proposed western extension of CR 33 to Abrahams Landing Road terminating at CR 45 (Springs–Amagansett Road) near Montauk Highway.

Major intersections

Location	mi	km	Destinations	Notes
Amagansett	0.00	0.00	Old Stone Highway to NY 27	Former southern terminus of CR 45
Amagansett	1.60	2.57	Devon Yacht Club	
Napeague	2.10	3.38	Cranberry Hole Road	Former CR 33
1.000 mi = 1.609 km; 1.000 km = 0.621 mi

== County Route 75 ==
County Route 75
- Location: Smith Point County Park
- Length: 0.5 mi (800 m)

County Route 75 is a short divided highway in Smith Point County Park that was intended to be part of the formerly proposed Ocean Parkway extension.

Major intersections

The entire route is in Smith Point County Park.

mi	km	Destinations	Notes
0.00	0.00	CR 46 north (William Floyd Parkway)	Roundabout; western terminus; southern terminus of CR 46
0.50	0.80	Smith Point	Roundabout; eastern terminus
1.000 mi = 1.609 km; 1.000 km = 0.621 mi
