= County Route 111 (Suffolk County, New York) =

Expressway in Suffolk County, New York, US

County Route 111
- Map of Suffolk County on Long Island with CR 111 highlighted in red

Route information
- Maintained by SCDPW
- Length: 4.77 mi (7.68 km)
- Existed: 1975–present

Major junctions
- South end: NY 27 in Eastport
- CR 51 in Eastport
- North end: I-495 in Manorville

Location
- Country: United States
- State: New York
- County: Suffolk

Highway system
- County routes in New York; County Routes in Suffolk County
← CR 110	→ CR 112

County Route 111 (CR 111) is a north–south county road in Suffolk County, New York, in the United States. It runs northwest and southeast from New York State Route 27 (NY 27) at exit 62 near Eastport to Interstate 495 (I-495) at exit 70 in Manorville. It serves as a connecting route between central Long Island and the Hamptons. The road is known as Captain Daniel Roe Highway, for Captain Daniel Roe (1740–1820) of Selden, who served in the French and Indian War and was a captain in the Revolutionary War. Within Manorville, the road is also known as Eastport Manor Road. It also appears on maps as Port Jefferson-Westhampton Road, for the communities in which the route was originally intended to have its north and south endpoints in.

== Route description ==
CR 111 begins at an incomplete interchange with NY 27. Currently designed as a diamond interchange with collector/distributor roads, the intersection was originally planned as a cloverleaf with the service roads. The route heads northwest through rural areas as a four-lane expressway with a wide grassy median and a speed limit of 55 miles per hour (89 km/h).

The highway intersects with CR 51 (East Moriches–Riverhead Road) by way of a half-diamond interchange, with an exit ramp from CR 111 south and an entrance ramp to CR 111 north. Following this junction, it crosses over a long dirt road named Toppings Path.

As CR 111 advances northwest of Toppings Path, it approaches a slightly more residential area of Manorville to the west and Manorville Hills County Park to the east. The southbound lanes feature a right-in/right-out interchange with Gordon Street, leading to Eastport–Manor Road (formerly CR 55). Subsequently, CR 111 meets the northern end of Eastport Manor Road at a signalized intersection with the southbound lanes.

North of this intersection, CR 111 transitions from an expressway to a surface road with a lower speed limit of 45 miles per hour (72 km/h), proceeding via the original alignment of Eastport–Manor Road for the duration of the route.

Upon encountering a pair of traffic signals with Halsey Manor Road and Chapman Boulevard, CR 111 enters a more commercial area, housing two main shopping centers anchored by a King Kullen supermarket and CVS Pharmacy. Further northwest, CR 111 intersects with exit 70 of Interstate 495 (Long Island Expressway), a diamond interchange with traffic signals.

CR 111 concludes at the northern signal with I-495 west. However, Eastport Manor Road extends for a short distance as a two-lane, 30-mile-per-hour (48 km/h) road.

== History ==
The route was first planned by Suffolk County in the 1960s to serve as a link between major locations on the northern and southern shores. However, the only part of this route to ever be constructed is a small section between Eastport and Manorville. The initial plans were cancelled due to county budget cuts and environmental opposition to constructing a highway through the Pine Barrens region.

=== Completed segment ===
The current CR 111 opened to traffic in early 1975. It runs from the Long Island Expressway (I-495) in Manorville to Sunrise Highway (NY-27) in Eastport. It is a major link in the road network on Long Island. This is due to how it connects NY-27 to I-495, given the fact that it provides motorists with a link between the Hamptons and New York City, in addition to its suburbs in Nassau County and western Suffolk.

=== Unbuilt segments ===
New York State Route 113
- Port Jefferson–Westhampton Beach Road
- Location: Port Jefferson Station–Westhampton Beach

A map showing the built (black) and unbuilt (red) segments of CR 111 (also known as Port Jefferson–Westhampton Beach Road).'"`UNIQ--ref-0000002E-QINU`"''"`UNIQ--ref-0000002F-QINU`"''"`UNIQ--ref-00000030-QINU`"'

As suggested by its name, Port Jefferson–Westhampton Beach Road (CR 111) was intended to travel between Port Jefferson and Westhampton Beach, and connect to several highways via interchanges: the east end of CR 90, the west end of the cancelled extension of CR 105, and a cancelled northern extension of CR 55 (Eastport–Manor Road). As originally planned, CR 111 would have been a 21-mile (34 km) highway extending from North Country Road (NY 25A) and NY 347 in Port Jefferson Station, to Montauk Highway (CR 80) in Westhampton Beach. In addition to being a convenient travel route, the routing would have been strategic, as well, as it was intentionally planned as a link between the deep-water port of Port Jefferson Harbor and the Calverton Naval Weapons Reserve Plant in Calverton to the former Suffolk County AFB in Westhampton Beach.

As per the 1970 Nassau-Suffolk Regional Planning Board recommendation, CR 111 would be transferred to the New York State Department of Transportation (NYSDOT). This would have resulted in CR 111 being renamed as New York State Route 113.

==== Proposed routing ====
Heading southeast from NY 25A and NY 347, CR 111 was to replace Canal Road. It would then have interchanges with CR 83 (Patchogue–Mount Sinai Road) and Coram–Mount Sinai Road, where it would have broken away from Canal Road and run along its south side. CR 111 would then replace Whiskey Road west of its intersection with Miller Place–Middle Island Road and Coram–Sweezeytown Road. It would break away from Whiskey Road east of Middle Island Boulevard, cross over Miller Place–Yaphank Road, and reunite with Whiskey Road again until the proposed interchange with CR 21 (Rocky Point–Yaphank Road). CR 111 would then shift to the northeast corner of CR 21 and Whiskey Road, running parallel with Whiskey Road until north of the intersection with Currans Road, where it would cross over Whiskey Road and remain along its south side until its terminus at CR 46 (William Floyd Parkway) in Ridge.

East of William Floyd Parkway (CR 46), CR 111 was intended to have an interchange and then curve south through Brookhaven State Park on land formerly owned by the Brookhaven National Laboratory. After the interchange with Middle Country Road (NY 25), it would shift eastward along the northern border of Brookhaven Lab, crossing the Robert Cushman Murphy County Park twice. In between this Suffolk County Preserve area, it would run through the grounds of the Grumman Calverton Naval Weapons Industrial Reserve Plant. It was to then follow along Wading River–Center Moriches Road (former CR 25) before heading south again toward the Peconic River. The road would join its existing section on the northeast corner of the westbound service road on the Long Island Expressway (I-495) at exit 70.

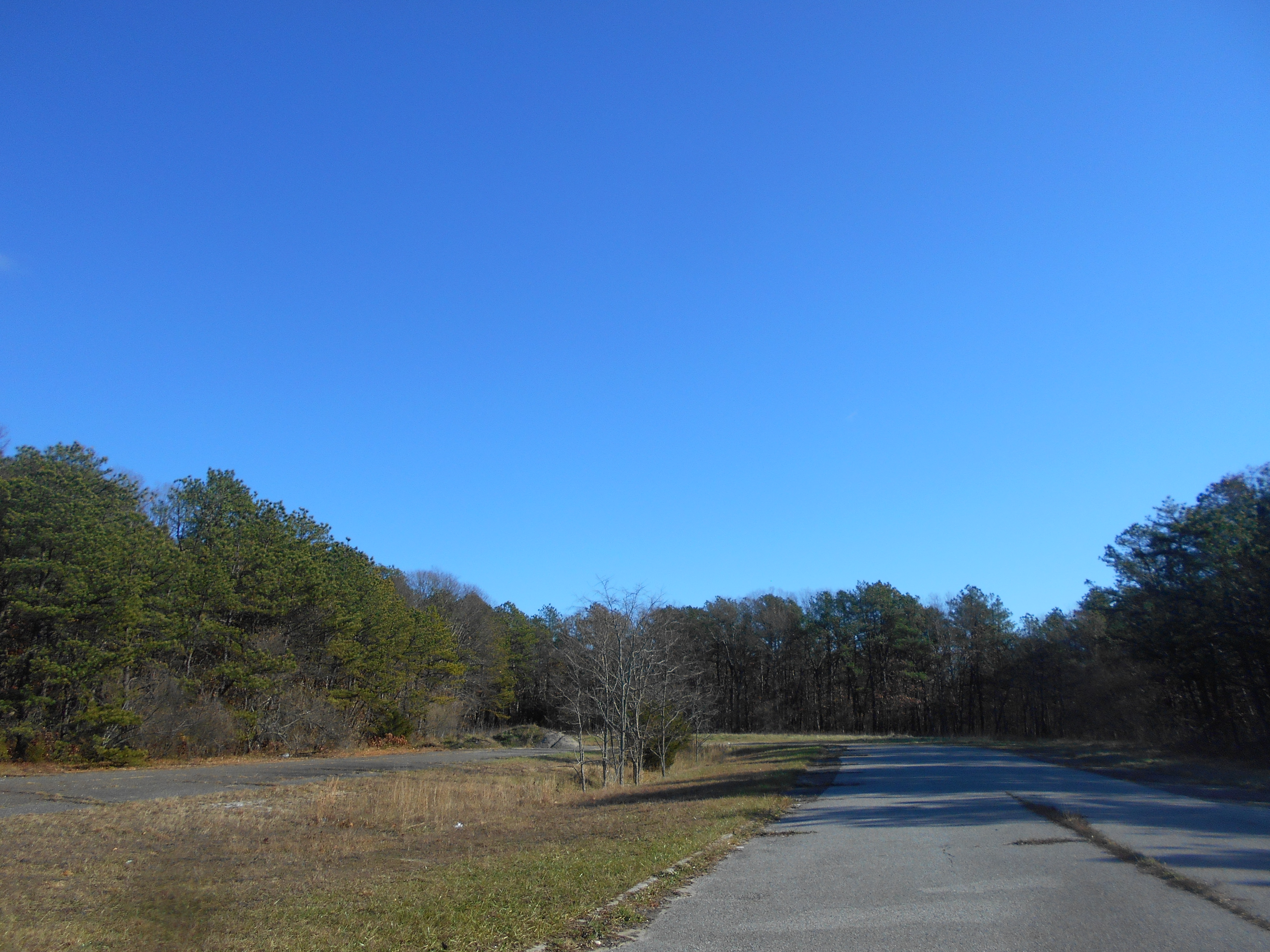
Abandoned stub at a frontage road for NY 27 for a CR 111 extension to Westhampton Beach

Continuing southeast from the existing highway's southeastern end at the interchange with NY 27, CR 111 was to run southeast across the Pine Barrens. It would run roughly parallel to CR 71 (Old Country Road) before intersecting with it at the Montauk Branch of the Long Island Rail Road. It was then intended to replace CR 71 as it crossed Montauk Highway and headed through the village of Westhampton Beach towards the Atlantic Ocean coastline.

Much of the right-of-way for the unbuilt portions of the highway is now part of a public nature preserve, with the Paumanok Path running along parts of the right-of-way.

== Safety improvements ==
Local residents and political leaders have made considerable efforts to enhance the safety conditions on County Route 111 (CR 111), particularly during peak travel times in the summer season. CR 111 acts as a significant conduit for travelers moving between the Long Island Expressway (I-495) and NY 27, often resulting in traffic congestion during Friday and Sunday afternoons. This issue is particularly noticeable in Manorville, where CR 111 plays a vital role in linking local services and stores.

In the 2010s, a controversy arose regarding a series of tall, metal transmission line poles, which had been recently installed along the highway by LIPA and PSEG Long Island. It was argued that the poles, which were placed too close to the road (at times a mere 3 feet (1 m) from the edge of the pavement), presented major safety hazards to motorists, and that the placement of the poles did not conform with federal laws. Among the politicians who called for the removal of the poles and the burial of the line was Brookhaven Town Supervisor Edward Romaine. Ultimately, the lines were buried and the poles were removed, with LIPA and PSEG using capital funds for the project.

== Major intersections ==
The entire route is in Suffolk County.

Location	mi	km	Destinations	Notes
Eastport	0.00	0.00	NY 27 – New York, Montauk	Southern terminus; exit 62 on NY 27
Eastport	0.74	1.19	CR 51 – East Moriches, Eastport	Southbound exit and northbound entrance
Manorville	1.75	2.82	Eastport Manor Road	At-grade intersection; former CR 55
Manorville			Northern end of limited-access section	
Manorville	4.77	7.68	I-495 – New York, Riverhead	Northern terminus; exit 70 on I-495
1.000 mi = 1.609 km; 1.000 km = 0.621 mi: Incomplete access
