= Northampton, New York =

Northampton is the name of some places in the U.S. state of New York:

- Northampton, Fulton County, New York, a town
- Northampton, Suffolk County, New York, a census-designated place (CDP) and hamlet
- The town of Gates, New York, called "Northampton" from 1797 until 1812
