= Old Country Road (disambiguation) =

Old Country Road is an east–west highway in Nassau and Suffolk counties in New York, in the United States.

Old Country Road may also refer to:

- County Route 58 (Suffolk County, New York), north of the hamlet of Riverhead
- County Route 71 (Suffolk County, New York), along the south shore of Long Island near the hamlet of Westhampton
