= Lufker Airport =

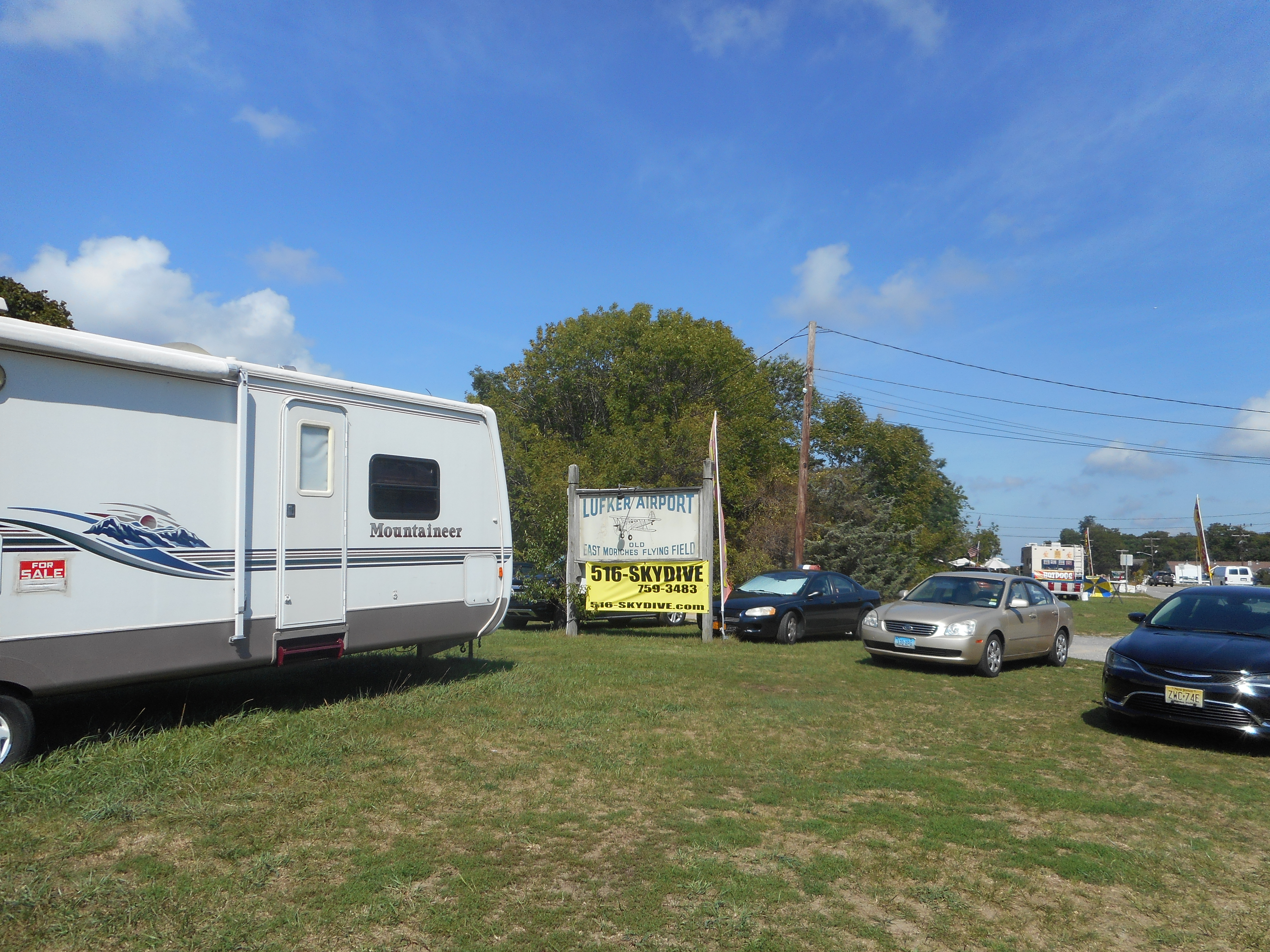
- Sign for Lufker Airport, off of Montauk Highway
- IATA: none; ICAO: none; FAA LID: 49N

Summary
- Airport type: Public use
- Owner: Louis Lufker
- Serves: East Moriches, New York
- Elevation AMSL: 57 ft / 17 m
- Coordinates: 40°49′29″N 072°45′03″W

Map
- Location of airport in New York

Runways
Direction	Length		Surface
Direction	ft	m	Surface
N/S	2,300	701	Turf

Statistics (2010)
- Aircraft operations: 2,500
- Based aircraft: 43
- Source: Federal Aviation Administration

Lufker Airport (FAA LID: 49N, formerly O00) is a privately owned, public use airport located one nautical mile (2 km) northeast of the central business district of East Moriches, in Suffolk County, New York, United States.

It has a 36/18 2300 ft turf runway and has a pattern altitude of 800 ft MSL and shares a taxiway with Spadaro Airport.

The field is mainly used for banner towing, skydiving, glider towing, and flight instruction, and has been operational since the late 1940s. The airport was purchased April 1984 by Louis Lufker from Teddy Kijowski. The airfield is open to the public and has FAA Identifier: 49N. There is no control tower and operations are restricted to daylight hours.

== History ==
The airport was originally a farm field owned by Teddy Kijowski's father. The farm was used to grow cabbage, melons etc. Teddy began taking flying lessons from Frog Chapman's Airfield in the late 1940s which was located one mile to the west of Lufker Airport in the same town of East Moriches (Frog Chapmans Airport has long been closed and the East Moriches Elementary School sits were the airport used to be). This happens to be the same airport (Chapmans) where Juan Trippe (The founder of Pan American Airlines) bought his first airplane, a "Curtiss Jenny" for the Harvard Aero Club. After Teddy soloed his first airplane, he began taking airplanes into his father's field. He used a dirt road that ran down the middle of the fields as his runway. The dirt road is where the current runway lays. Eventually, Teddy bought his own airplane and began keeping it on the field. He also turned the dirt road into a grass runway. Friends began to bring their airplanes there and people started to rent tie down spaces. It was not until 1963 that Bart Spadaro bought land next to Teddy's Airfield and decided to put a runway in that paralleled Teddy's runway. In the 1970s the airport was used for flight instruction and several airplanes were built from the ground up. Including one built by Donald Trumps cousin Al Creighton.

=== Airport sold ===
Teddy Kijowski sold the airfield to Louis Lufker in April 1984. Lou Lufker was a Suffolk County police officer who was interested in the field for several years. At the time Mr. Lufker was operating an aerial advertising business around the New York City area and was looking for his own field. Lou was familiar with the field, many years prior he gave flight instruction lessons (out of Zahn's and Bayport Airports) and brought his students in there. Mr. Lufker was also operating seaplanes (charter) around the Long Island area around the same time. As an Army Reserve Aviator, Lou brought Army helicopters into Teddy's Field and gave Mr. Kijowski rides. A friendship started which eventually led to Teddy selling the field to Mr. Lufker.

=== Lufker Airport today ===
Since 1984, Mr. Lufker has rented the field out to several banner towing operations and at one time operated a glider school. He also gave aerobatic flight lessons in his 1941 Stearman Biplane. Mr. Lufker is an A and P mechanic and maintains aircraft on the field. In the early 1990s Mr. Lufker opened a machine shop at the field. Lufker Precision Manufacturing made precision metal and plastic gears for the aircraft, automotive and medical industry. The field is home to general aviation aircraft including antique biplanes, ultralights, powered parachutes, helicopters, and gliders. There is also a skydiving operation and a non profit airplane museum called "The Pioneers of Flight". During the summer, there is a flea market on the airport grounds. The EAA (Experimental Aircraft Association) has a chapter on the field. In the past years, the field has also hosted carnivals and a circus during the summer months. On July 16, 2025, demolition began at the airport to convert it to an open, green space. This marks the end of an airport that's been on long Island for 85 years.

=== Trivia ===
In 1995 Mr. Lufker purchased a 1931 open cockpit Bird biplane in Penn Valley, California. With his eldest son, he flew it back to Lufker Field. During the 52 hours that it took to traverse the country they encountered extreme heat over the Mojave Desert, severe turbulence, strong headwinds over Texas, and a rainstorm in Alabama. A leaking magnetic compass put them off course by 50 miles forcing Mr. Lufker to use his hand held survival compass the remainder of the flight. The trip was accomplished strictly by dead reckoning and pilotage navigation. No radios or GPS were used.

The field has also been used by Hollywood actor Cliff Robertson. He flew into the field in the 1970s and hang around. John F. Kennedy Jr. also flew in and park his airplane and go out to the Hamptons. Mr. Lufker owns a plane (Marine Corps L-19) that President John F. Kennedy bought and put on his compound so John Jr. could play in as a kid. New York State Governor George Pataki used the field in the state helicopter.

== Facilities and aircraft ==
Lufker Airport covers an area of 30 acres (12 ha) at an elevation of 57 feet (17 m) above mean sea level. It has one runway designated N/S with a turf surface measuring 2,300 by 100 feet (701 x 30 m).

For the 12-month period ending September 8, 2010, the airport had 2,500 general aviation aircraft operations, an average of 208 per month. At that time there were 43 aircraft based at this airport: 58% single-engine, 35% ultralight, and 7% glider.

== See also ==
- List of airports in New York
