= Spadaro Airport =

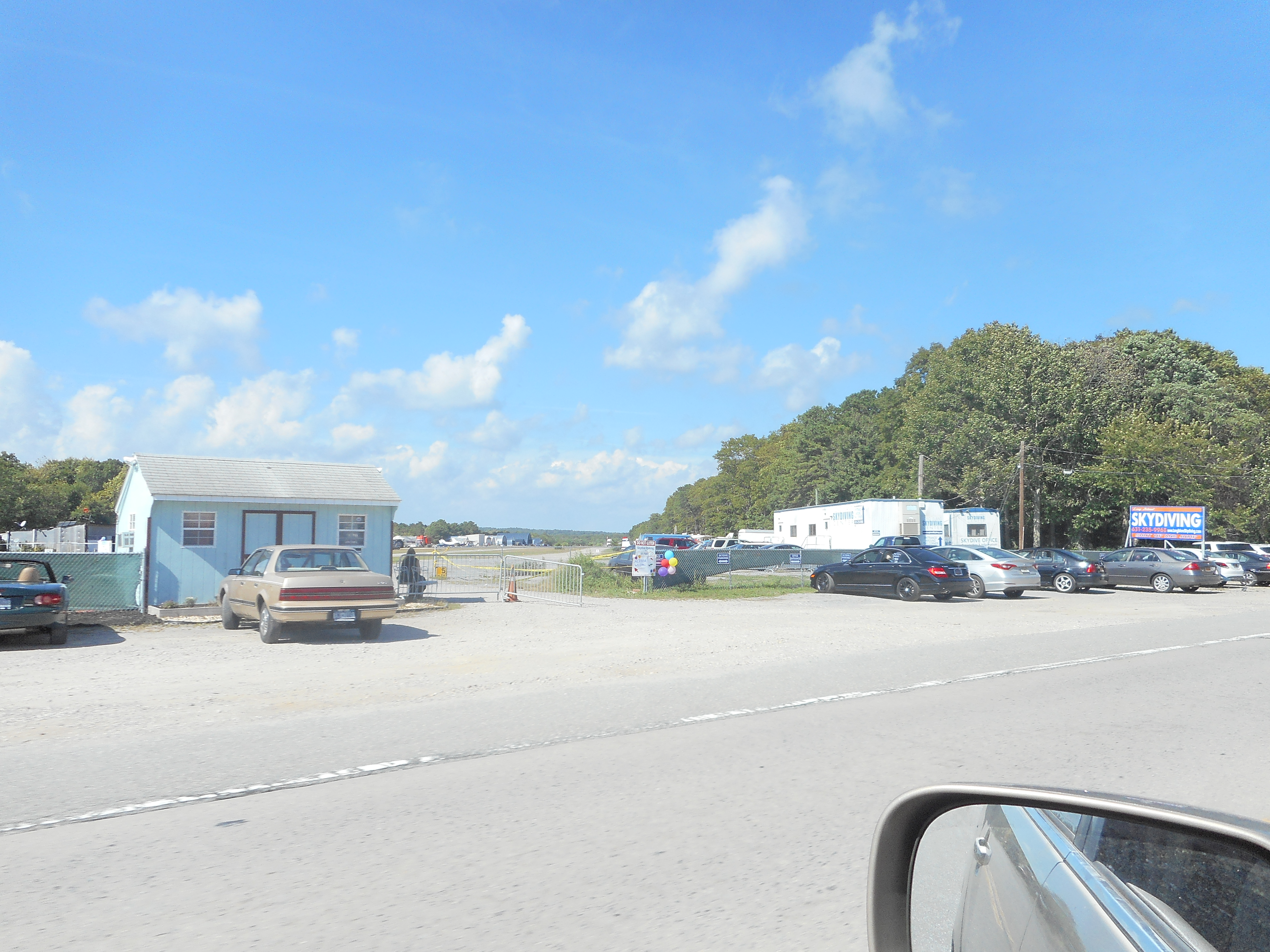
- Spadaro Airport, as seen from Montauk Highway
- IATA: none; ICAO: none; FAA LID: 1N2

Summary
- Airport type: Public use
- Owner: Bart Spadaro
- Serves: East Moriches, New York
- Elevation AMSL: 50 ft / 15 m
- Coordinates: 40.8232313°N 72.7487313°W

Map
- Location of airport in New York 1N2 (the United States)

Runways
Direction	Length		Surface
Direction	ft	m	Surface
18/36	2,400	732	Asphalt

Statistics (2010)
- Aircraft operations: 6,100
- Based aircraft: 29
- Source: Federal Aviation Administration

Spadaro Airport (FAA LID: 1N2) was a privately owned, public use airport located one nautical mile (2 km) northeast of the central business district of East Moriches, in Suffolk County, New York, United States. It was included in the National Plan of Integrated Airport Systems for 2011–2015, which categorized it as a reliever airport.

Spadaro was connected to Lufker Airport via a taxiway and aircraft are able to taxi from one airport to the other.

It was named for Bartholomew Spadaro, who originally owned the airport.

== Facilities and aircraft ==
Spadaro Airport covered an area of 50 acres (20 ha) at an elevation of 50 feet (15 m) above mean sea level. It had one runway designated 18/36 with an asphalt surface measuring 2,400 by 25 feet (732 x 8 m).

For the 12-month period ending September 8, 2010, the airport had 6,100 general aviation aircraft operations, an average of 16 per day. At that time there were 29 aircraft based at this airport: 52% ultralight, 41% single-engine, 3% multi-engine, and 3% helicopter.

Bart Spadaro (founder of the airport) died October 5, 2013, at which time Susan Spadaro (Bart's daughter) had assumed control of the airport. Since then, aviation services such as aircraft maintenance, aircraft repair, aircraft inspections, aircraft rentals, flight instruction, sightseeing, etc. were no longer available at this facility. Skydiving operations continued at the airport and were provided by an independent operator. Airport maintenance was the removal of debris around the perimeter of the airport as well as removal of abandoned vehicles and hangars. The dirt taxiway was not very well maintained. The segmented circle was typically overgrown with weeds and was not visible during warmer months. There were no wind sock, flags or any other devices on the field to indicate wind direction or wind speed. The asphalt runway surface was in generally good condition although there was a pothole near the beginning of runway 18 on the right side. Markings for runway 18 were faded to the point of no longer being visible. Adjacent to the runway was mostly bare sandy ground that was prone to creating dust clouds and flung gravel in the presence of propeller blast. Susan Spadaro is not known to hold any credentials in the field of aviation. As of 2016, the airport is closed to operations. The town of Brookhaven decided to shut down the airport, due to failure of pilots to action the noise abatement procedures established by the town, bringing a series of complaints that led to its closure, as well as the closure of Lufker Airport for three months. In 2018, the airport and the land were listed for sale, the listing price, 2,900,000 USD.

== See also ==
- List of airports in New York
