= Long Island Game Farm =

Long Island Game Farm - Wildlife Park & Children's Zoo
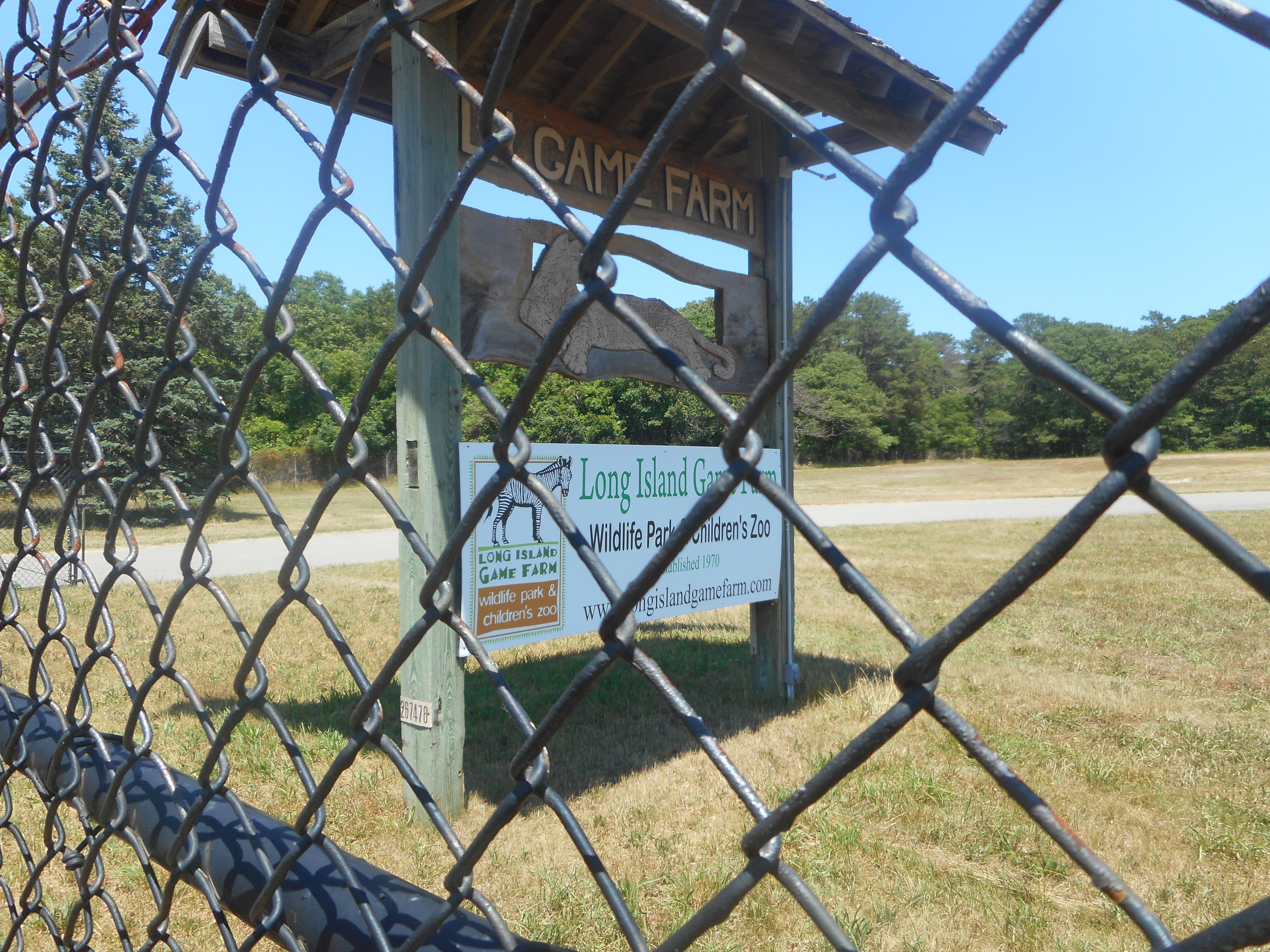
- Sign for the Long Island Game Farm off of 489 Chapman Boulevard; June 25, 2016.
- Interactive map of Long Island Game Farm - Wildlife Park & Children's Zoo
- 40°50′54″N 72°47′20″W
- Date opened: 1970
- Location: Manorville, New York, United States
- Land area: 29 acres (12 ha)
- Website: www.longislandgamefarm.com

The Long Island Game Farm, situated at 489 Chapman Boulevard in Manorville, New York, was established in 1970 by Stanley and Diane Novak. The park is now home to bison, camels, zebras, deer, goats, lambs, lemurs, wallabies, foxes, capybaras, and exotic birds (emus and cockatoos), which also include various education areas and entertainment.

Stanley Novak, his wife Diane and daughters Melinda and Susan built the zoo on 29 acres (12 ha). It is the largest children’s zoo and wildlife park on Long Island.
