= Eastport-South Manor Central School District =

School district in the U.S. state of New York

Location
- Towns of Brookhaven, Riverhead, and Southampton Suffolk County, New York; United States

District information
- Type: Public
- Established: 2000
- Superintendent: Joseph A. Steimel
- Budget: $115,802,809

Students and staff
- Students: 2,705 (2025-2026)
- Staff: 611
- District mascot: Sharks
- Colors: Navy Silver

Other information
- District Offices: 149 Dayton Avenue Manorville, NY 11949
- Website: www.esmonline.org

Eastport-South Manor Central School District is a school district that serves parts of the towns of Brookhaven, Riverhead, and Southampton towns in eastern Suffolk County, New York. Commonly known as "ESM", the district serves seven hamlets; all of Eastport, almost the entirety of Manorville and parts of Ridge, Upton (Brookhaven National Laboratory), Calverton, Mastic, and Remsenburg-Speonk.

== History ==
The school district was formed in 2000 from the merger of two local districts, Eastport Union Free School District (UFSD) in Eastport, and South Manor UFSD in Manorville.

These two districts, along with several others, participated in a study in the mid-1990s to determine the feasibility of combining the many local districts into one centralized district. Proponents suggested that this would benefit the schools through lower central administration costs, and would allow significantly better programming for students, since a combined district would have a much higher enrollment than any of the individual districts. Further, the area covered in the scope of the study had experienced significant growth, particularly in Manorville, which had doubled the population in a span of only ten years. Finally, neither South Manor UFSD nor East Moriches UFSD (a nearby district that also participated in the study) had high schools of their own and were paying costly tuition to send their students to other high schools. Ultimately, only Eastport and South Manor decided to combine to create a new district.

Before the merger, Eastport's mascot was the Duck, paying tribute to the large local duck farming industry, due to which Eastport was commonly referred to as "the duck capital of the world". The mascot of the South Manor school district was the Mustang.

The total enrollment for the 2015-2016 school year was 3,525 students, dropping by over 800 students in just ten years.

== Schools ==
- South Street School (Grades K-2)
- Tuttle Avenue Elementary School (Grades K-2)
- Dayton Avenue School (Grades 3-6)
- Eastport Elementary School (Grades 3 - 6)
- Eastport-South Manor Junior/Senior High School (Grades 7-12)

Before the two school districts merged, South Street School and Dayton Avenue School were the two schools of South Manor UFSD, serving grades K-9. Eastport Elementary was known as Eastport High School, but served all thirteen grades in one building. It was the only school in the former Eastport UFSD.

== Extracurricular activities ==
=== Theatre ===
The theater facilities include a black box theater capable of holding 250 audience members, a main stage theater with nearly 1000 seats, lighting and sound equipment, a booth, a lighting catwalk, rigging system, costume building facilities, dressing-rooms, an orchestra pit, and a scene shop. Several shows are put on in the Black Box stage. Two shows are put on a year on the Main Stage. Usually, the main stage productions consist of a Fall Drama/Comedy Play and a Spring Musical. However, some years the Fall play has been replaced with the "5 Day Play Challenge", where students write, produce, direct, and act in their own plays; all done in 5 days.

Since opening in 2003 the following shows have been put on:

- Moon Over Buffalo
- Guys and Dolls
- The Laramie Project
- Fiddler on the Roof
- Rumors
- Little Women
- The Crucible
- South Pacific
- Noises Off
- Les Miserables
- Picnic
- Anything Goes
- Lend Me a Tenor
- Beauty and The Beast
- West Side Story
- Inherit the Wind
- The Music Man
- Blithe Spirit
- The Sound Of Music
- The Diary of Anne Frank
- A Chorus Line
- The Last Night of Ballyhoo
- Little Shop of Horrors
- Crimes of the Heart
- Mary Poppins
- Sylvia
- Godspell
- The Little Mermaid
- Legally Blonde Canceled due to Covid-19
- Radium Girls
- The Addams Family
- Mean Girls
- Clue
- Chicago
- The Crucible
- Into the Woods
- Footloose
- The Curious Savage

=== Sports ===
The school is also known for its sports program. The school offers (most for both boys and girls): Lacrosse, Cross Country, Volleyball, Football, Wrestling, Basketball, Baseball, Softball, Track, Tennis, Soccer, Golf, Ice Hockey, Field Hockey, and Bowling.

=== Clubs ===
The Eastport-South Manor school district also provides its students with many extracurricular clubs and activities:

- Stage Crew
- Marching Band
- Color Guard
- Jazz Band
- Science Club
- S.A.L.T (Students Aiding Living Things)
- Yearbook Club
- National Junior Honor Society
- National Honor Society
- World Language Honor Society
- Student Council/Government
- Key Club
- Tri-M Music Honor Society
- Varsity Leaders Club
- Show Choir
- Chess Club
- Coding Club
- Debate Club

== Wall of Honor Project ==
From 2011-2013 at Eastport South Manor Junior-Senior High School, a committee of students, parents, teachers and administrators met to decide on an appropriate manner in which the community could honor the students that voluntarily enter the military upon their graduation from the high school. The ESM community decided to construct a Wall of Honor as a means to express their gratitude to the courageous alumni serving in the United States Armed Forces. This wall is designed to recognize graduates from the first graduation class (2004) to the present. The names of future graduates whom enter the military will also have their names added to the Wall of Honor. In order to support its construction, volunteers raised over $60,000.
