= Wildwood State Park =

Park in New York, United States

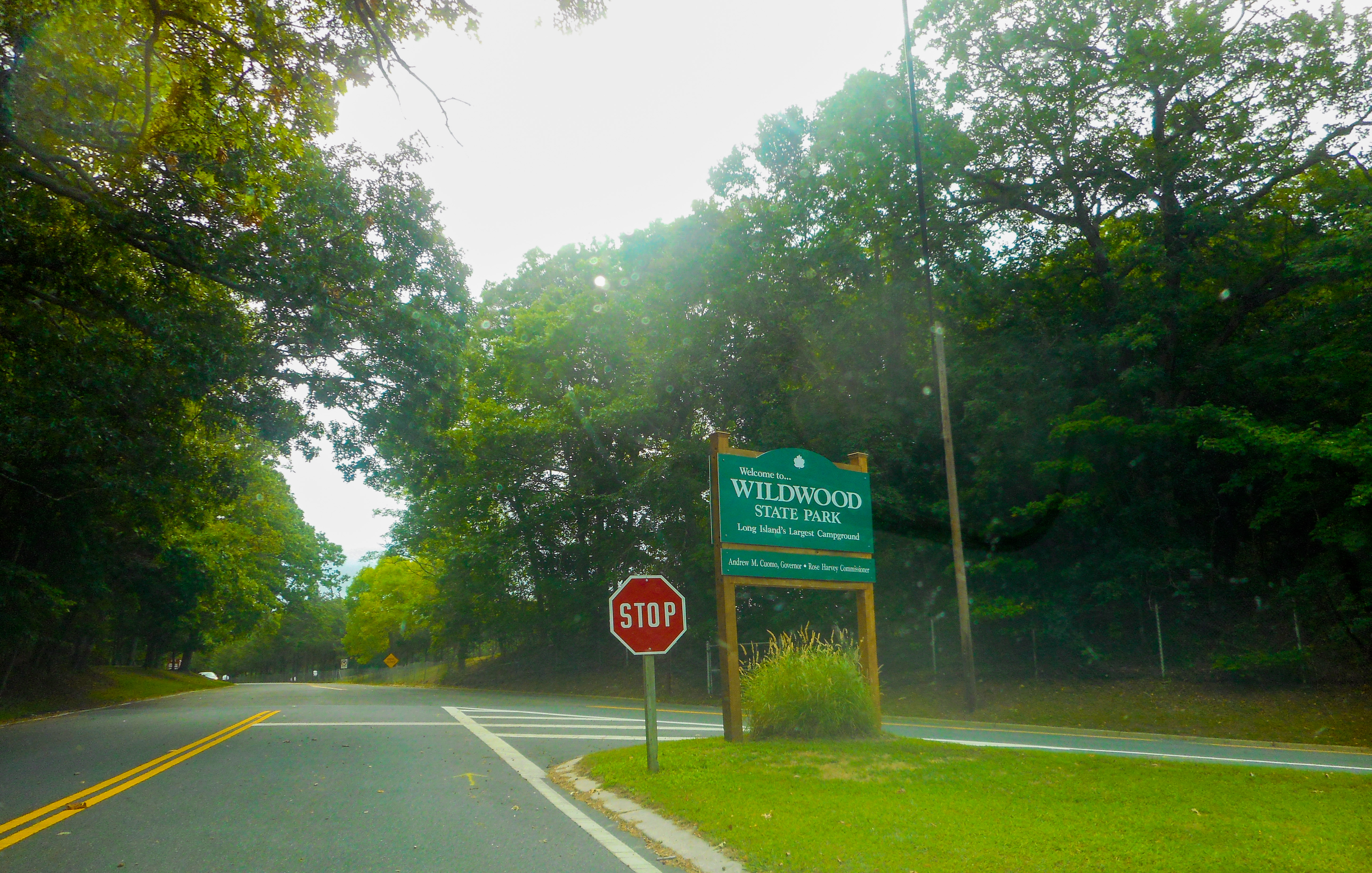
- The Wye at Wildwood State Park, where the two entrances from North Wading River Road and Hulse Landing Road converge.
- Interactive map of Wildwood State Park
- Location: Wading River, New York
- Coordinates: 40°57′38″N 72°47′43″W
- Area: 767 acres (3.10 km^{2})
- Created: 1925
- Operator: New York State Office of Parks, Recreation and Historic Preservation
- Visitors: 499,848 (in 2024)

Wildwood State Park is a 772-acre (3.12 km^{2}) state park located in Suffolk County, New York. The park is in the Town of Riverhead on the north shore of Long Island. The park includes a beach on Long Island Sound.

The park offers a beach, a playground, picnic tables, hiking and biking, fishing, a campground with tent and trailer sites, cross-country skiing, recreation programs and a food concession.

== See also ==
- List of New York state parks
