= Northampton, Suffolk County, New York =

Northampton, New York
- Hamlet and census-designated place
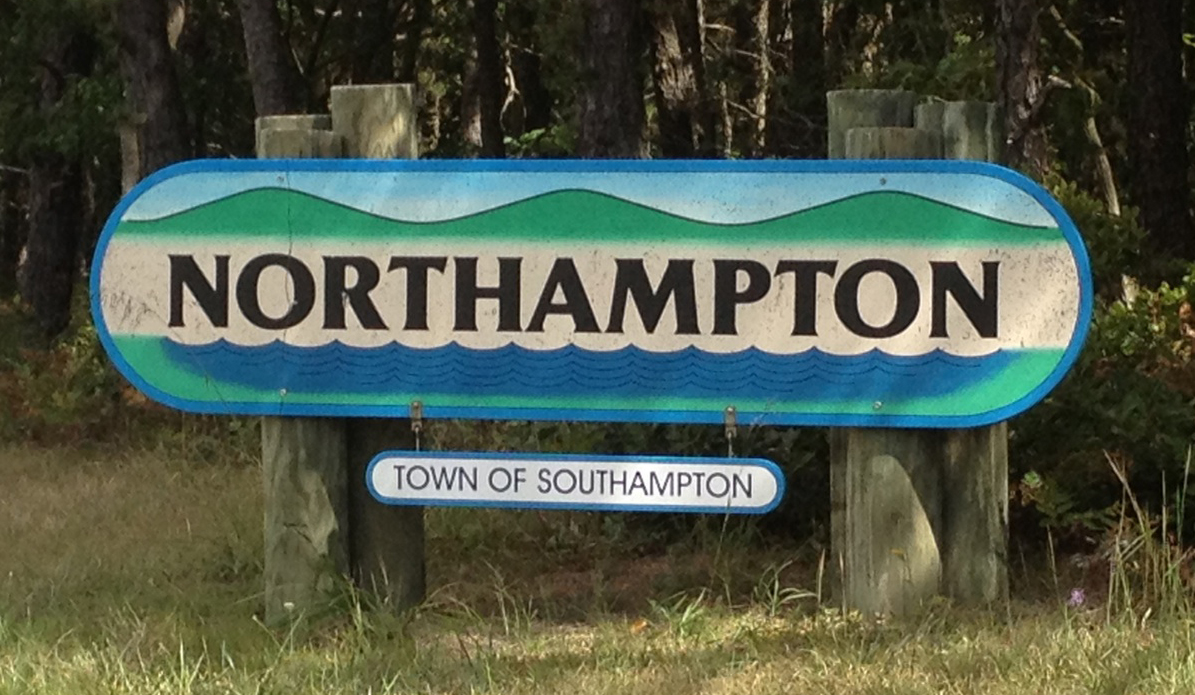
- Northampton sign on CR 51.

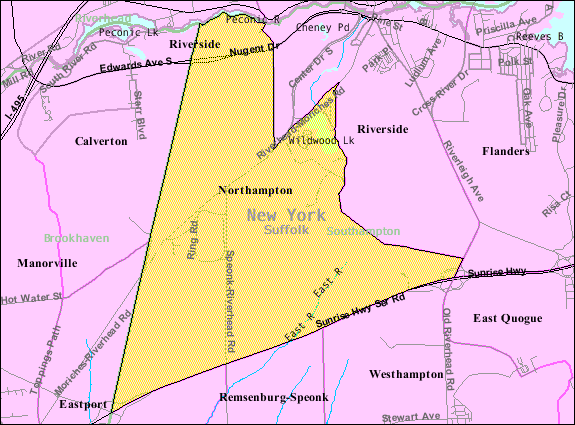
- U.S. Census map

- Location within the state of New York
- Coordinates: 40°52′47″N 72°41′49″W
- Country: United States
- State: New York
- County: Suffolk
- Town: Southampton

Area
  - Total: 11.47 sq mi (29.70 km^{2})
  - Land: 11.37 sq mi (29.44 km^{2})
  - Water: 0.10 sq mi (0.26 km^{2})

Population (2020)
  - Total: 763
  - Density: 67.1/sq mi (25.91/km^{2})
- Time zone: UTC-5 (Eastern (EST))
  - Summer (DST): UTC-4 (EDT)
- FIPS code: 36-51418

Northampton (/ˈnɔːrθæmptən, -ɔːrðæ-/ NOR-thamp-tən, -dhamp-) is a hamlet and census-designated place (CDP) in Suffolk County, New York, United States on Long Island. The CDP population was 570 at the 2010 census.

Northampton is in the Town of Southampton. The Eastern Campus of Suffolk County Community College is located in Northampton.

== Geography ==
Northampton is at 40°52′47″N 72°41′49″W (40.879853, -72.696948).

According to the United States Census Bureau, the CDP has a total area of 11.7 square miles (30.2 km^{2}), of which 11.5 square miles (29.9 km^{2}) is land and 0.12 square miles (0.3 km^{2}), or 0.86%, is water.

The CDP was created for the 2000 census and includes part of the former village of Pine Valley, which disincorporated in 1991.

Historical population
Census	Pop.	Note	%±
2020	763		—
U.S. Decennial Census

== Demographics ==
As of the census of 2000, there were 468 people, 158 households, and 121 families residing in the CDP. The population density was 51.6 inhabitants per square mile (19.9/km^{2}). There were 205 housing units at an average density of 22.6 per square mile (8.7/km^{2}). The racial makeup of the CDP was 46.37% White, 44.23% African American, 0.85% Native American, 0.85% Asian, 2.35% from other races, and 5.34% from two or more races. Hispanic or Latino of any race were 8.33% of the population.

There were 158 households, out of which 38.0% had children under the age of 18 living with them, 48.7% were married couples living together, 20.9% had a female householder with no husband present, and 23.4% were non-families. 20.3% of all households were made up of individuals, and 5.7% had someone living alone who was 65 years of age or older. The average household size was 2.96 and the average family size was 3.31.

In the CDP, the population was spread out, with 29.3% under the age of 18, 9.6% from 18 to 24, 30.3% from 25 to 44, 20.9% from 45 to 64, and 9.8% who were 65 years of age or older. The median age was 34 years. For every 100 females, there were 91.0 males. For every 100 females age 18 and over, there were 82.9 males.

The median income for a household in the CDP was $47,500, and the median income for a family was $35,893. Males had a median income of $32,292 versus $30,956 for females. The per capita income for the CDP was $23,660. About 6.6% of families and 9.0% of the population were below the poverty line, including 6.5% of those under age 18 and none of those age 65 or over.

== See also ==
- Wildwood Lake (New York)
