= Wildwood Lake (New York) =

Lake in New York, United States

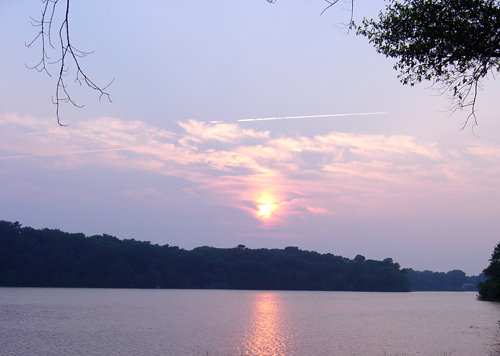
- Wildwood Lake in July 2004

- Location within New York Location within the United States
- Location: Suffolk County, Long Island, New York
- Coordinates: 40°53′41″N 72°40′26″W
- Basin countries: United States
- Surface area: 64 acres (26 ha)
- Max. depth: 60 ft (18 m)
- Surface elevation: 13 ft (4 m)

Wildwood Lake is a natural lake located in Suffolk County on Long Island in Northampton near Riverhead, New York, United States. The lake was formed by glaciers during the last Ice age. There is a variety of fish species present in the lake, including:

- Largemouth Bass
- Chain Pickerel
- Pumpkinseed
- Yellow Perch
- White Perch
- Brown bullhead
- Rock Bass

The lake is also stocked with Trout by the Town of Southampton.

Fishing in Wildwood Lake is limited to Southampton residents or persons accompanied by a resident guide only.{{ There is a state DEC access ramp for small hand- or electric-powered craft, but fishing is limited, as stated above.

It is said that there was once a road crossing through the middle of the lake, but it has never been proven.
