= Manorville, New York =

- Hamlet and census-designated place
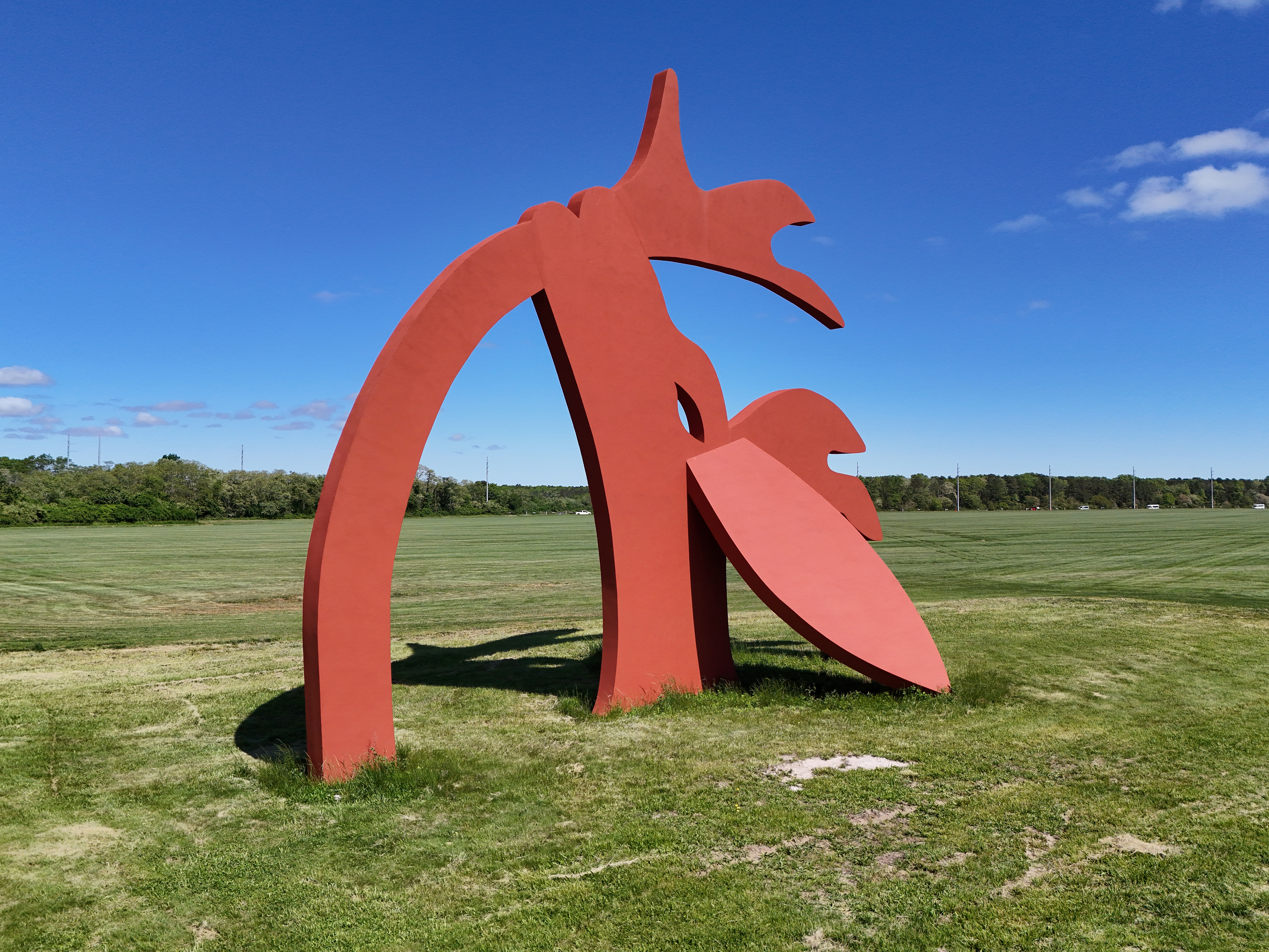
- Stargazer by Linda Scott on CR111
- Motto: "The Gateway to the Hamptons"
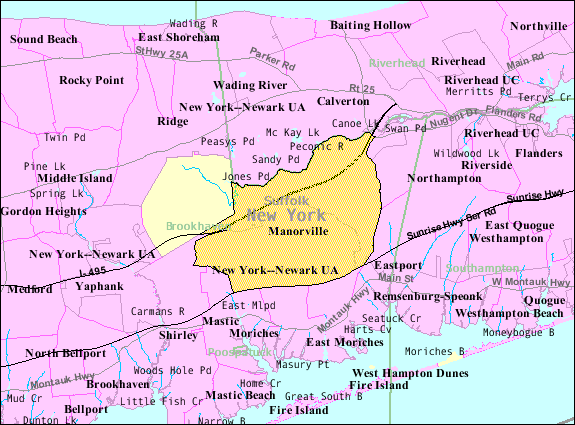
- U.S. Census map

- Location on Long Island Location within the state of New York
- Coordinates: 40°50′53″N 72°47′38″W
- Country: United States
- State: New York
- County: Suffolk
- Town: Brookhaven

Area
  - Total: 25.48 sq mi (65.98 km^{2})
  - Land: 25.43 sq mi (65.87 km^{2})
  - Water: 0.042 sq mi (0.11 km^{2})
- Elevation: 52 ft (16 m)

Population (2020)
  - Total: 14,317
  - Density: 563.0/sq mi (217.36/km^{2})
- Time zone: UTC−05:00 (Eastern Time Zone)
  - Summer (DST): UTC−04:00
- ZIP Code: 11949
- Area codes: 631, 934
- FIPS code: 36-45139
- GNIS feature ID: 0970329

Manorville is a hamlet and census-designated place (CDP) in Suffolk County, New York, United States. The population was 14,317 at the time of the 2020 census.

Manorville is mostly in the Town of Brookhaven, but its northeast corner is in the Town of Riverhead. Due to its proximity to The Hamptons, Manorville is nicknamed "The Gateway to the Hamptons".

== History ==
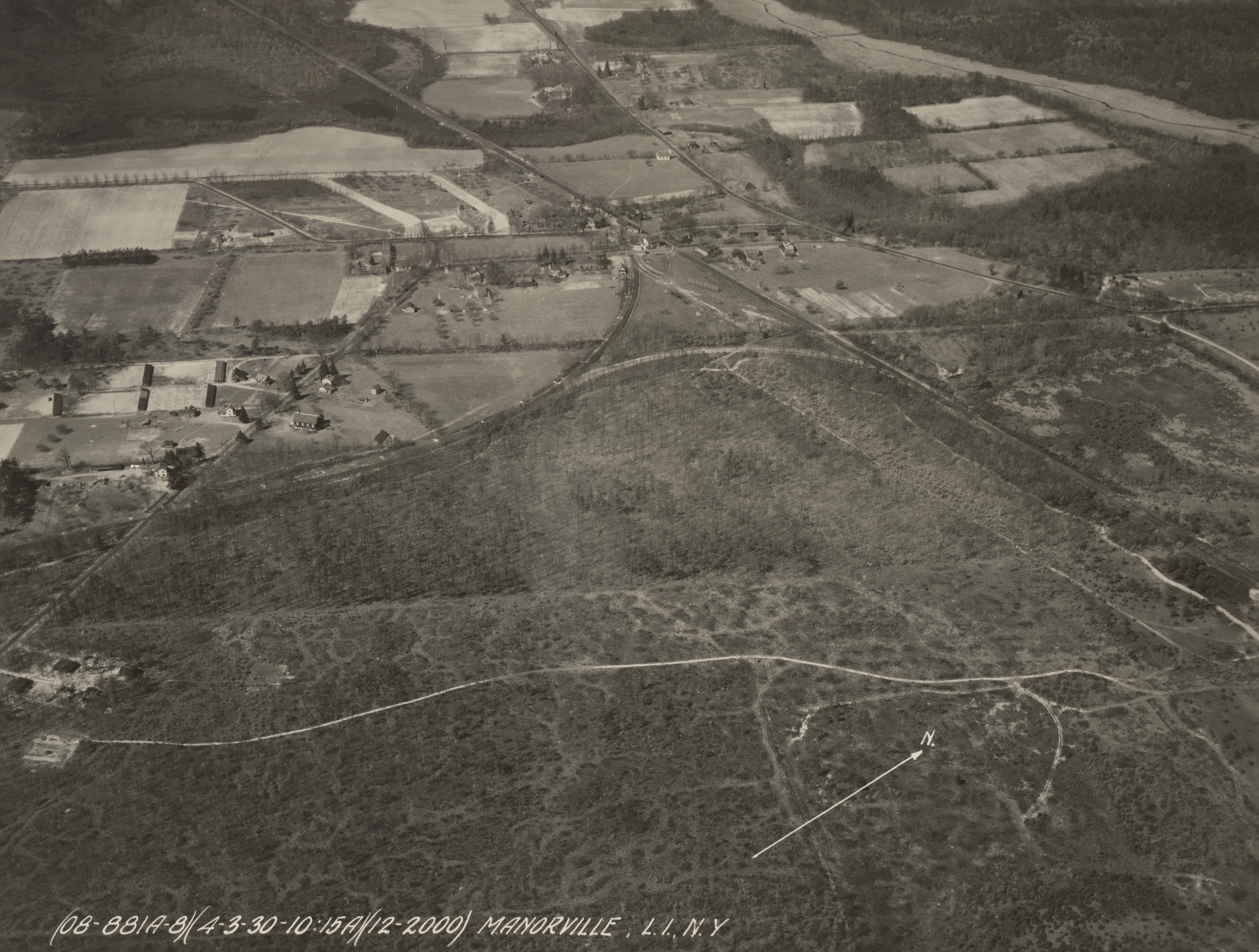
Manorville in 1931

The hamlet of Manorville was a small farming community for many years. The area of the hamlet once laid within the huge tract of land known as Manor St. George, a land grant given to Col. William "Tangier" Smith in 1693 for recognition of his service as governor of Tangier in Morocco. In 1844, the Long Island Rail Road built a station called St. George's Manor, which was situated off of Ryerson Avenue. However, Seth Raynor, the station agent who was a patriot during the American Revolutionary War, disliked the name due to its similarity to the British and their colonial dominance (Saint George, the patron saint of England, is a symbol of the English monarchy), and decided to paint over the sign, leaving only the word "Manor". The hamlet changed its name to "Manorville" with the opening of its post office in 1907, but timetables and Long Island Rail Road documents retained the name "Manor" until 1907 or 1908.

The Long Island serial killer is sometimes dubbed the "Manorville killer" because four victims' remains were discovered in Manorville from 2000 to 2011.

== Geography ==
According to the United States Census Bureau, the CDP has an area of 25.5 square miles (66.1 km^{2}), of which 25.5 square miles (66.0 km^{2}) is land and 0.04 square miles (0.1 km^{2}), or 0.16%, is water.

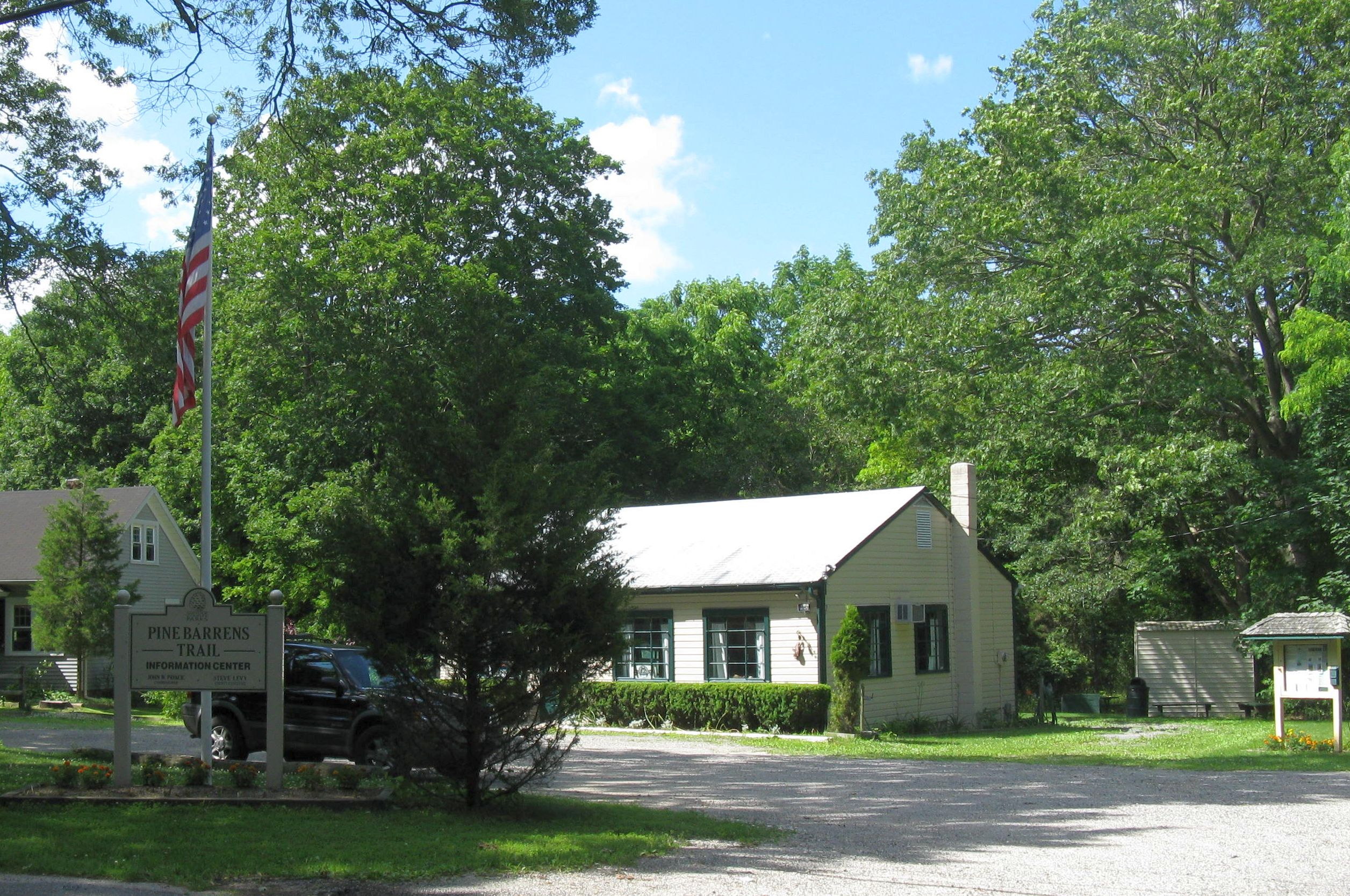
Headquarters of Long Island Central Pine Barrens in the community

The hamlet is at the western edge of, and partially within, the Long Island Central Pine Barrens. The land is heavily wooded, and features some wetlands, particularly in the northern section near the Peconic River. Much of the northeastern portion of the hamlet is in the Pine Barrens' "Core Preservation Area", where no further development is allowed. This area also serves as a primary source for Long Island's groundwater preserve.

Manorville is in the center of Long Island with no access to the water. It lies partially on the Ronkonkoma terminal moraine, which creates some slightly rolling topography, especially in the central portion of the hamlet. The glacial topography of the area features several kettle hole ponds, the most well-known of which is Punk's Hole, where a Revolutionary War captain was rumored to have hid from the British.

== Demographics ==
=== 2020 census ===
As of the 2020 census, Manorville had a population of 14,317. The median age was 43.7 years. 21.4% of residents were under the age of 18 and 16.6% of residents were 65 years of age or older. For every 100 females there were 96.5 males, and for every 100 females age 18 and over there were 94.3 males age 18 and over.

93.4% of residents lived in urban areas, while 6.6% lived in rural areas.

There were 5,159 households in Manorville, of which 31.9% had children under the age of 18 living in them. Of all households, 57.3% were married-couple households, 14.2% were households with a male householder and no spouse or partner present, and 22.6% were households with a female householder and no spouse or partner present. About 23.7% of all households were made up of individuals and 11.9% had someone living alone who was 65 years of age or older.

There were 5,364 housing units, of which 3.8% were vacant. The homeowner vacancy rate was 1.0% and the rental vacancy rate was 3.3%.

Racial composition as of the 2020 census
Race	Number	Percent
White	12,244	85.5%
Black or African American	362	2.5%
American Indian and Alaska Native	38	0.3%
Asian	254	1.8%
Native Hawaiian and Other Pacific Islander	0	0.0%
Some other race	355	2.5%
Two or more races	1,064	7.4%
Hispanic or Latino (of any race)	1,428	10.0%

=== 2000 census ===
As of the 2000 census, there were 11,131 people, 4,122 households, and 2,938 families residing in the CDP. The population density was 438.9 inhabitants per square mile (169.5/km^{2}). There were 4,243 housing units at an average density of 167.3 per square mile (64.6/km^{2}). The racial makeup of the CDP was 96.38% White, 1.18% African American, 0.12% Native American, 0.66% Asian, 0.04% Pacific Islander, 0.75% from other races, and 0.89% from two or more races. Hispanic or Latino of any race were 4.14% of the population.

There were 4,122 households, out of which 36.4% had children under the age of 18 living with them, 63.4% were married couples living together, 5.9% had a female householder with no husband present, and 28.7% were non-families. 24.4% of all households were made up of individuals, and 9.6% had someone living alone who was 65 years of age or older. The average household size was 2.69 persons and the average family size was 3.25 persons.

In the hamlet, the population was spread out, with 27.6% under the age of 18, 5.2% from 18 to 24, 33.1% from 25 to 44, 20.9% from 45 to 64, and 13.2% who were 65 years of age or older and the median age was 37 years. For every 100 females, there were 98.4 males and for every 100 females age 18 and over, there were 94.7 males.

=== Income and poverty ===
According to a 2018 estimate, the median income for a household was $95,851, and the median income for a family was $131,910. The per capita income for the CDP was $41,120. About 2.4% of families and 2.8% of the population were below the poverty threshold, including 2.3% of those under age 18 and 3.2% of those age 65 or over.

== Education ==
Manorville is served by the Eastport-South Manor Central School District.

== Media ==
W245BA and WEHM are radio stations licensed to serve Manorville.

== Notable people ==
- Tom Clarke - a leader of the Irish Republican Brotherhood had a 60-acre (240,000 m^{2}) farm in 1906-07 before returning to Ireland
- Seth Raynor - noted golf course architect
- Matt Goncalves - NFL Player

== Attractions ==
Built in 1975, the 18-foot-high (5.5 m) Shrine of Our Lady of the Island overlooks Moriches Bay. On the 70 acres surrounding the statue, there are several attractions including a Rosary walk through the woods, the Stations of the Cross, and a large Pietà.

== See also ==
- Long Island Game Farm
