= Eastport, New York =

- Hamlet and census-designated place
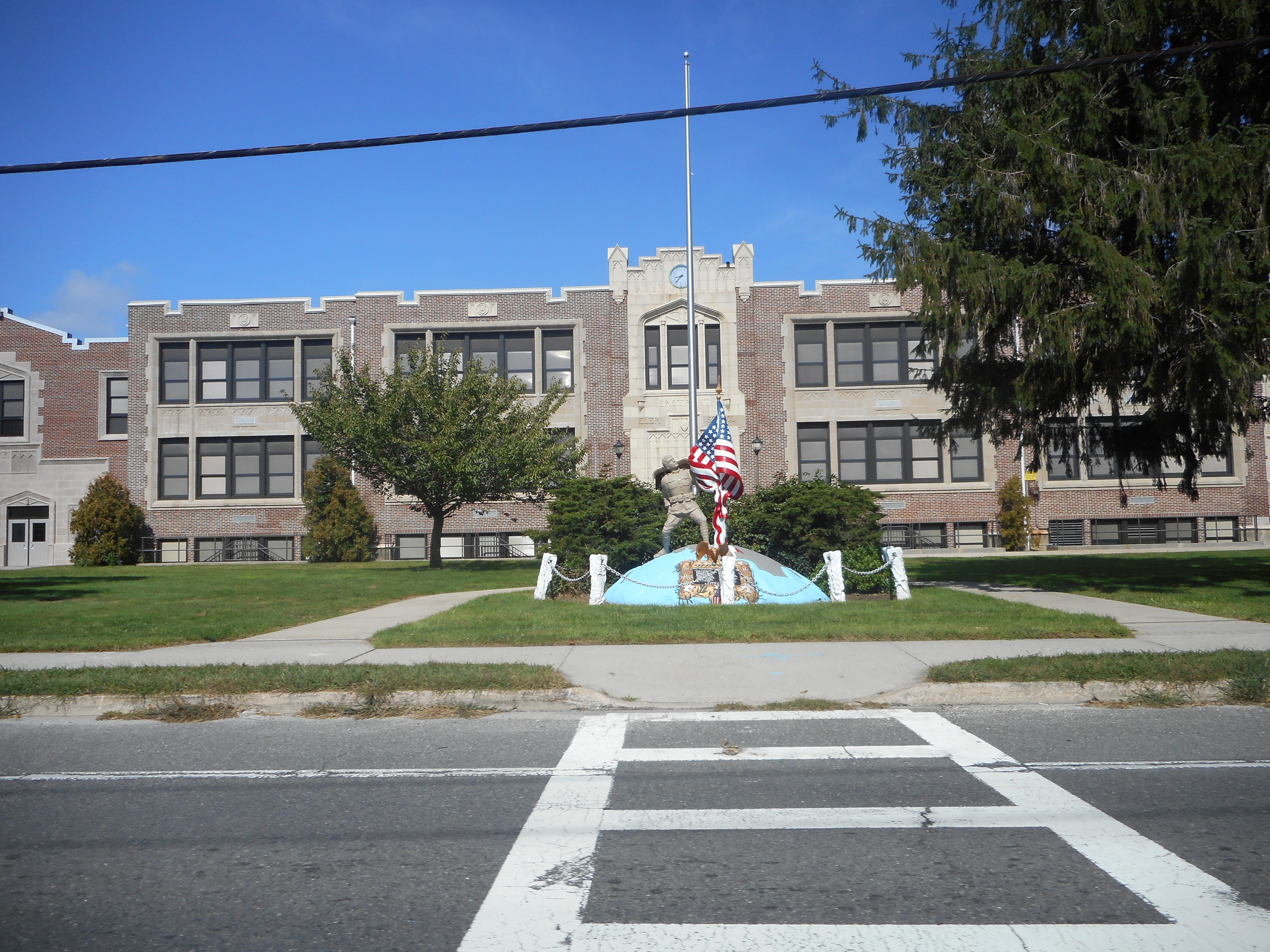
- The Eastport Elementary School on Montauk Highway with a World War I memorial in front of it.

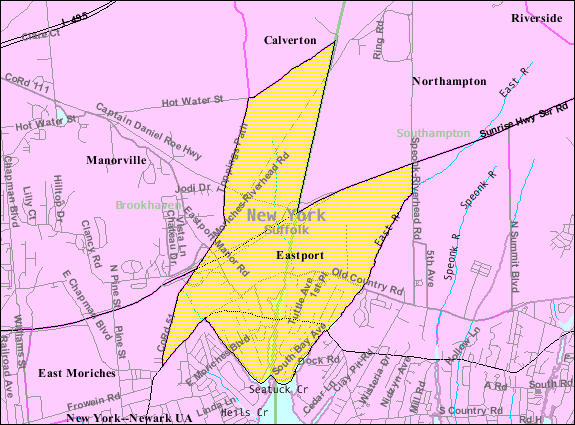

- Location within Long Island Location within New York
- Coordinates: 40°49′52″N 72°43′47″W
- Country: United States
- State: New York
- County: Suffolk

Area
  - Total: 4.58 sq mi (11.85 km^{2})
  - Land: 4.45 sq mi (11.52 km^{2})
  - Water: 0.13 sq mi (0.33 km^{2})
- Elevation: 30 ft (9 m)

Population (2020)
  - Total: 2,219
  - Density: 498.9/sq mi (192.62/km^{2})
- Time zone: UTC−05:00 (Eastern Time Zone)
  - Summer (DST): UTC−04:00
- ZIP Code: 11941
- Area codes: 631, 934
- FIPS code: 36-22810
- GNIS feature ID: 0949307

Eastport is a hamlet and census-designated place (CDP) in Suffolk County, New York, United States, on the South Shore of Long Island. As of the 2020 census, Eastport had a population of 2,219.

== History ==
Eastport town is built on Shinnecock land. The present hamlet dates to 1772, when two men built the dam that formed what has come to be called the West Pond, which created a dividing line between Brookaven and Southampton. They built two mills below the dam, a saw mill and a gristmill. By 1845, the area to the east of the West Pond had come to be known as Waterville. The land to the west was called Seatuck, after a nearby creek. When, in 1860, the United States Postal Department needed to define the town to deliver mail, it combined the two areas. The name Seatuck was dropped for being too similar to Setauket, New York and the combined area was named Eastport.

Eastport was long and best known as the center of Long Island's duck industry. The first duck farms were established in the area in the 1880s. In the first half of the 20th century it was the capital of the production of Long Island ducks, producing 6.5 million ducks a year from 29 farms going to market. By 1915, the Long Island Duck Growers' Association was located in Eastport; and, in 1949, Cornell University established the Duck Disease Research Laboratory there. Routine surveillance carried out by the Duck Disease Research Laboratory identified the first case of Duck hepatitis virus (DHV-1) in the United States 1949 and, in 1967, the first case of Duck plague on the American Continent.

Practically all duck farms have been phased out and the descendants of the original farmers sold the valuable waterfront property for residential development projects.

== Geography ==
Eastport straddles the border of the towns of Brookhaven and Southampton.

According to the United States Census Bureau, the CDP has a total area of 5.4 square miles (14.0 km^{2}), of which 5.3 square miles (13.6 km^{2}) is land and 0.12 square miles (0.3 km^{2}), or 2.41%, is water.

Historical population
Census	Pop.	Note	%±
2020	2,219		—
U.S. Decennial Census

== Demographics ==
=== 2020 census ===
As of the 2020 census, Eastport had a population of 2,219. The median age was 52.4 years. 14.7% of residents were under the age of 18 and 32.1% were 65 years of age or older. For every 100 females, there were 98.3 males, and for every 100 females age 18 and over, there were 96.0 males age 18 and over.

98.5% of residents lived in urban areas, while 1.5% lived in rural areas.

There were 907 households in Eastport, of which 21.8% had children under the age of 18 living in them. Of all households, 57.4% were married-couple households, 14.0% were households with a male householder and no spouse or partner present, and 22.7% were households with a female householder and no spouse or partner present. About 24.1% of all households were made up of individuals and 14.2% had someone living alone who was 65 years of age or older.

There were 1,015 housing units, of which 10.6% were vacant. The homeowner vacancy rate was 2.2% and the rental vacancy rate was 2.3%.

Racial composition as of the 2020 census
Race	Number	Percent
White	1,846	83.2%
Black or African American	36	1.6%
American Indian and Alaska Native	10	0.5%
Asian	23	1.0%
Native Hawaiian and Other Pacific Islander	2	0.1%
Some other race	146	6.6%
Two or more races	156	7.0%
Hispanic or Latino (of any race)	300	13.5%

=== Demographic estimates ===
According to the 2021 American Community Survey, the population was 2,095. The age distribution was 19.9% under the age of 18, 4.9% from 18 to 24, 24.1% from 25 to 44, 28.5% from 45 to 64, and 22.7% who were 65 years of age or older. The median age was 45.3 years. For every 100 females, there were 90.6 males. Hispanic or Latino of any race were 12.6% of the population.

=== Income and poverty ===
The median income was $121,250 and the median family income was $138,333. The per capita income for the CDP was $45,891. 6.01% of the population were below the poverty threshold, with 3.34% of those aged 60 or over.

== Education ==
Eastport is located within the Eastport-South Manor Central School District.

== Notable people ==
- Scott Disick, American media personality and socialite
