= East Moriches, New York =

Hamlet and census-designated place in Suffolk County, United States

- Hamlet and census-designated place
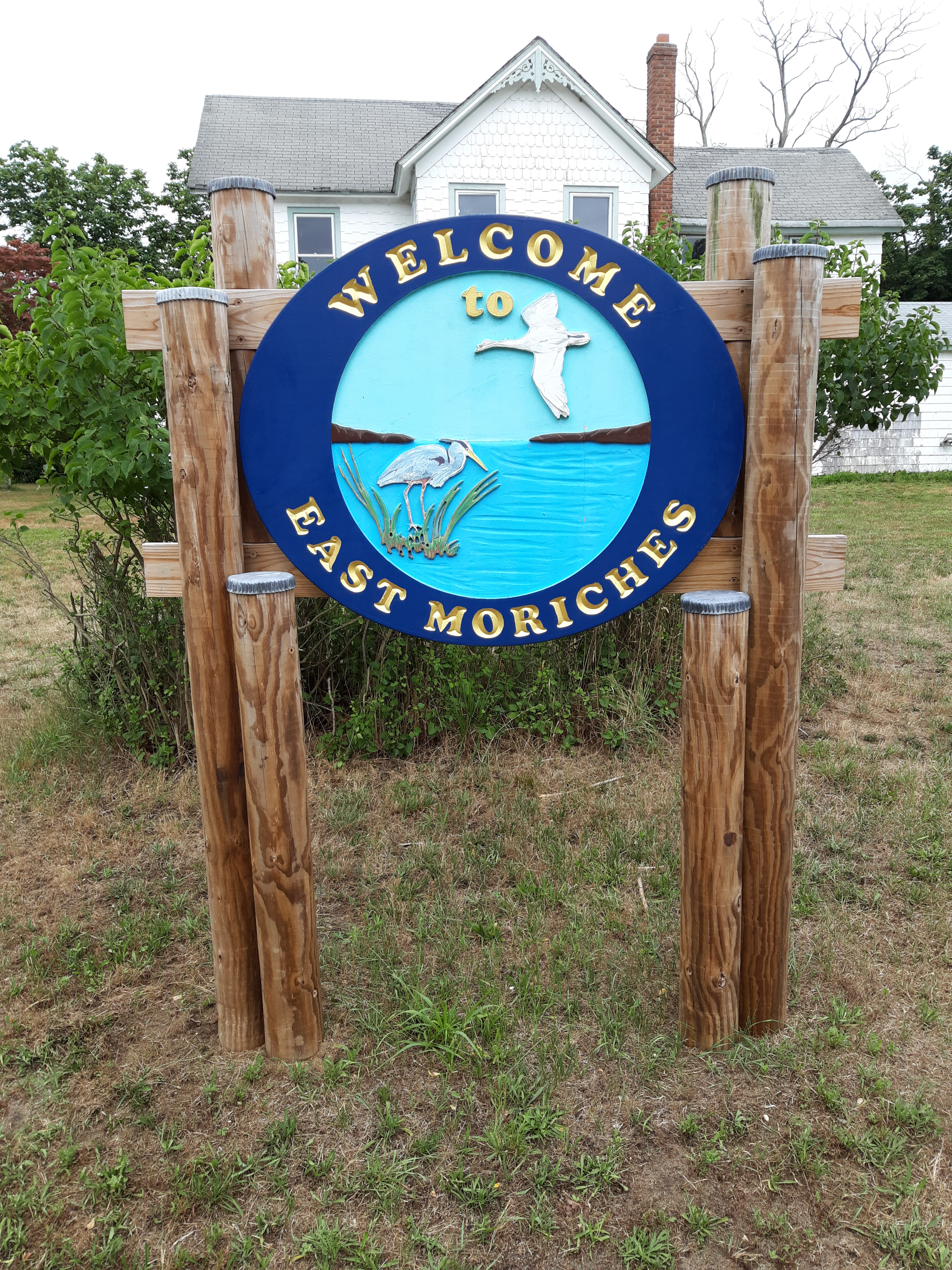
- East Moriches' welcome sign
- Motto: Long Island's Best Kept Secret
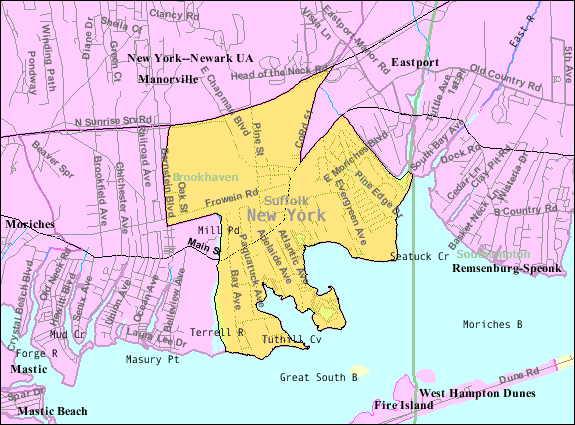
- U.S. Census map

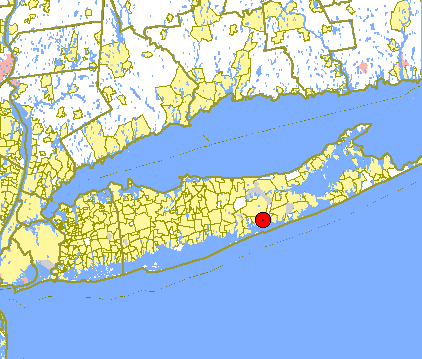
- Map of East Moriches

- Location on Long Island Location in the state of New York
- Coordinates: 40°48′18″N 72°45′39″W
- Country: United States
- State: New York
- County: Suffolk
- Town: Brookhaven

Area
  - Total: 6.01 sq mi (15.57 km^{2})
  - Land: 5.43 sq mi (14.06 km^{2})
  - Water: 0.58 sq mi (1.51 km^{2})
- Elevation: 30 ft (9 m)

Population (2020)
  - Total: 5,946
  - Density: 1,095.4/sq mi (422.93/km^{2})
- Time zone: UTC−05:00 (Eastern Time Zone)
  - Summer (DST): UTC−04:00
- ZIP Code: 11940
- Area codes: 631, 934
- FIPS code: 36-22546
- GNIS feature ID: 0970099

East Moriches (/moʊˈrɪtʃɪz/ moh-RITCH-iz) is a hamlet and census-designated place in the Town of Brookhaven, Suffolk County, New York, United States near the south coast of Long Island. As of the 2020 census, East Moriches had a population of 5,946.

The name Moriches comes from Meritces, a Native American who owned land on The Moriches Neck.

== Geography ==
According to the United States Census Bureau, the CDP has a total area of 5.6 sq mi (14.6 km^{2}), of which 5.6 sq mi (14.4 km^{2}) is land and 0.15 sq mi (0.4 km^{2}), or 2.55%, is water.

Historical population
Census	Pop.	Note	%±
2020	5,946		—
U.S. Decennial Census

== Demographics ==
=== 2020 census ===
As of the 2020 census, East Moriches had a population of 5,946. The median age was 46.5 years. 20.7% of residents were under the age of 18 and 21.6% of residents were 65 years of age or older. For every 100 females there were 92.1 males, and for every 100 females age 18 and over there were 90.6 males age 18 and over.

99.1% of residents lived in urban areas, while 0.9% lived in rural areas.

There were 2,120 households in East Moriches, of which 32.6% had children under the age of 18 living in them. Of all households, 61.6% were married-couple households, 12.8% were households with a male householder and no spouse or partner present, and 21.1% were households with a female householder and no spouse or partner present. About 19.9% of all households were made up of individuals and 11.6% had someone living alone who was 65 years of age or older.

There were 2,349 housing units, of which 9.7% were vacant. The homeowner vacancy rate was 1.6% and the rental vacancy rate was 5.9%.

Racial composition as of the 2020 census
Race	Number	Percent
White	5,141	86.5%
Black or African American	121	2.0%
American Indian and Alaska Native	17	0.3%
Asian	90	1.5%
Native Hawaiian and Other Pacific Islander	0	0.0%
Some other race	225	3.8%
Two or more races	352	5.9%
Hispanic or Latino (of any race)	571	9.6%

=== 2000 census ===
As of the census of 2000, there were 4,555 people, 1,510 households, and 1,180 families residing in the CDP. The population density was 836.3 inhabitants per square mile (322.9/km^{2}). There were 1,668 housing units at an average density of 306.6 per square mile (118.4/km^{2}). The racial makeup of the CDP was 95.55% White, 5.16% Hispanic or Latino, 1.58% African American, 0.04% Native American, 1.45% Asian, 0.24% Pacific Islander, 1.01% from other races, and 1.12% from two or more races.

There were 1,510 households, out of which 39.7% had children under the age of 18 living with them, 67.5% were married couples living together, 6.8% had a female householder with no husband present, and 21.7% were non-families. 17.0% of all households were made up of individuals, and 7.4% had someone living alone who was 65 years of age or older. The average household size was 2.90 and the average family size was 3.27.

In the CDP, the population was spread out, with 26.4% under the age of 18, 6.0% from 18 to 24, 30.2% from 25 to 44, 24.9% from 45 to 64, and 12.5% who were 65 years of age or older. The median age was 38 years. For every 100 females, there were 97.1 males. For every 100 females age 18 and over, there were 93.8 males.

The median income for a household in the CDP was $62,005, and the median income for a family was $71,000. Males had a median income of $50,991 versus $30,650 for females. The per capita income for the CDP was $24,086. About 2.2% of families and 3.5% of the population were below the poverty threshold, including 2.2% of those under age 18 and 5.8% of those age 65 or over.

== Education ==
East Moriches has an elementary school, recently built, as well as a middle school. Once a student graduates 8th grade, they may choose to attend one of three high schools; Westhampton Beach, Center Moriches, or Eastport-South Manor.

Students from the East Moriches school district commonly refer to themselves as EMO, as an abbreviation for East Moriches.

== TWA Flight 800 ==
East Moriches became known internationally on July 17, 1996, when TWA Flight 800 exploded 8 miles (13 km) off the coast and fell into the Atlantic Ocean. The United States Coast Guard Station, East Moriches, was used by emergency responders, and was the site where the bodies were initially prepared for transport. A helipad was constructed at the station, and the media located their equipment and crews there for breaking news. Today there are parks in Smith Point and Center Moriches on Long Island, New York dedicated to those who died in the crash, and a plaque bearing their names. The cause of the explosion, which killed all 230 passengers and crew on board, was determined to be a short circuit which caused the contents of the centre-wing fuel tank to explode; however, many alternative theories exist.
