= List of county routes in Suffolk County, New York (26–50C) =

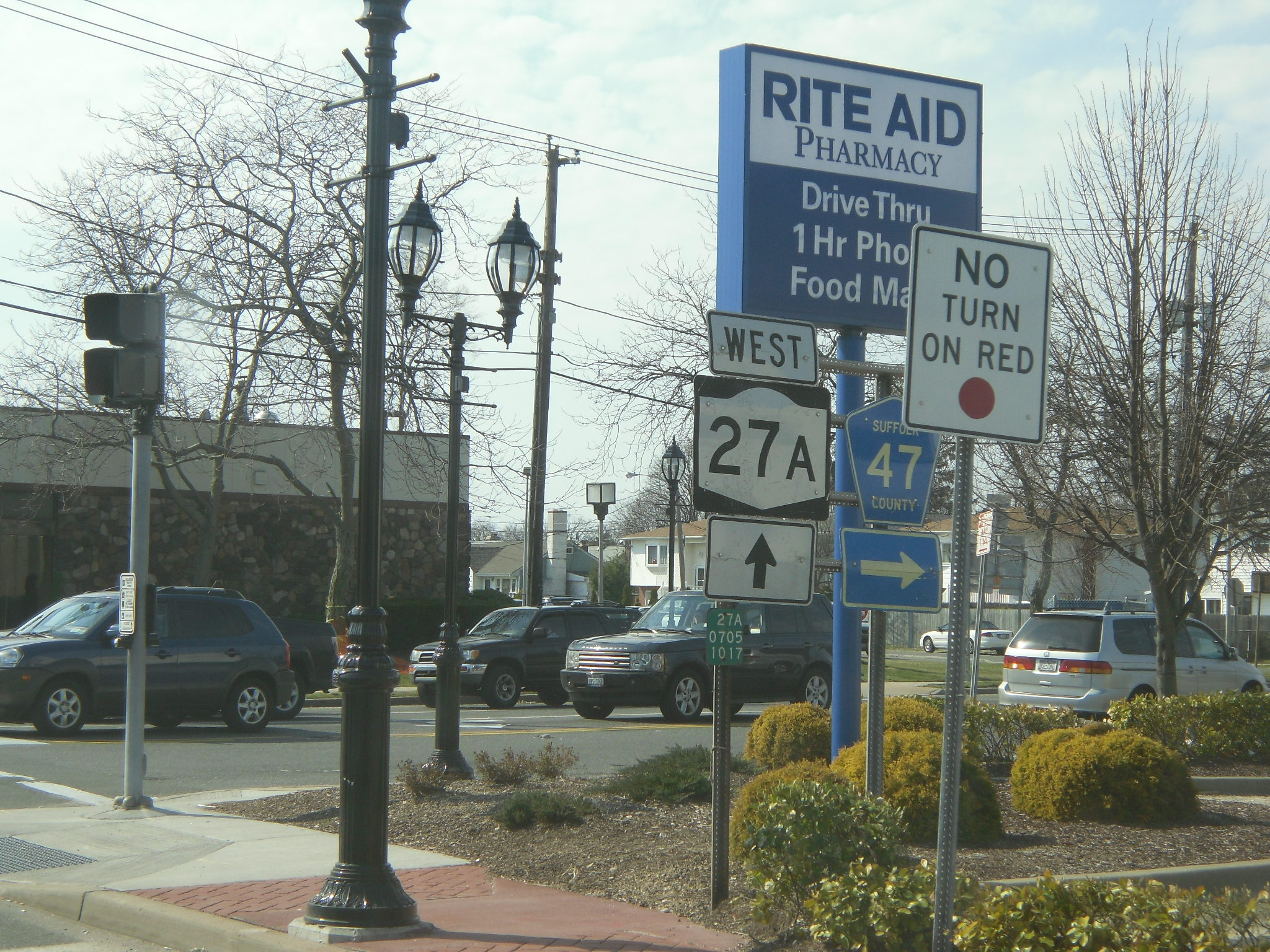
- Suffolk County Road 47 begins at NY 27A in Copiague.

Highway names
- Interstates: Interstate X (I-X)
- US Highways: U.S. Route X (US X)
- State: New York State Route X (NY X)
- County: County Route X (CR X)

System links
- New York Highways; Interstate; US; State; Reference; Parkways

County routes in Suffolk County, New York, are maintained by the Suffolk County Department of Public Works and signed with the Manual on Uniform Traffic Control Devices-standard yellow-on-blue pentagon route marker. The designations do not follow any fixed pattern. Routes 26 to 50 (including former suffixed routes of CR 50) are listed below.

== County Route 26 ==
County Route 26
- Location: Mattituck–Cutchogue
- Length: 4.7 mi (7.6 km)
- Existed: 1930–present

County Route 26 was the designation for New Suffolk Road from Mattituck to New Suffolk, and New Suffolk Lane from New Suffolk to Cutchogue. This designation was proposed to be relocated to the formerly proposed North Brookhaven Expressway, a former eastern extension of NY 347 from Mount Sinai to Wading River.

Major intersections

| Location | mi | km | Destinations | Notes |
|---|---|---|---|---|
| Mattituck | 0.00 | 0.00 | NY 25 – Riverhead | |
| New Suffolk | 3.20 | 5.15 | Main Street / 5th Street | Route direction changes from east/west to north/south |
| Cutchogue | 4.70 | 7.56 | NY 25 – Mattituck, Greenport, Orient | |
1.000 mi = 1.609 km; 1.000 km = 0.621 mi

== County Route 27 ==
County Route 27
- Location: Mattituck–Greenport
- Existed: 1930–1980s

County Route 27 was the original designation for Middle Road on the North Fork of Long Island. This road is now known as CR 48.

== County Route 27A ==
County Route 27A
- Location: Mattituck–East Mattituck
- Existed: 1960s–1960s

County Route 27A was a newer section of Middle Road in Mattituck called New Middle Road. It was merged into CR 27 before that route was replaced by CR 48.

== County Route 27B ==
County Route 27B
- Location: Mattituck–East Mattituck
- Existed: 1960s–1960s

County Route 27B was Wickham Avenue, a former segment of Middle Road that is now owned by the town of Southold.

== County Route 28 ==
County Route 28
- Location: North Amityville–Melville
- Length: 2.31 mi (3.72 km)

County Route 28 is a north-south road in southwestern Suffolk County known as New Highway and Republic Road. Officially designated as the Corporal Tony Casamento Highway, the road is a four-lane undivided highway between NY 27 and the interchange with Southern State Parkway where the road narrows down to two lanes. According to the New York State Department of Transportation, CR 28 is split into two sections: the signed portion that is New Highway between NY 27 and the Southern State Parkway, and the unsigned Republic Road between the Town of Babylon/Town of Huntington town line and CR 5 (Ruland Road).

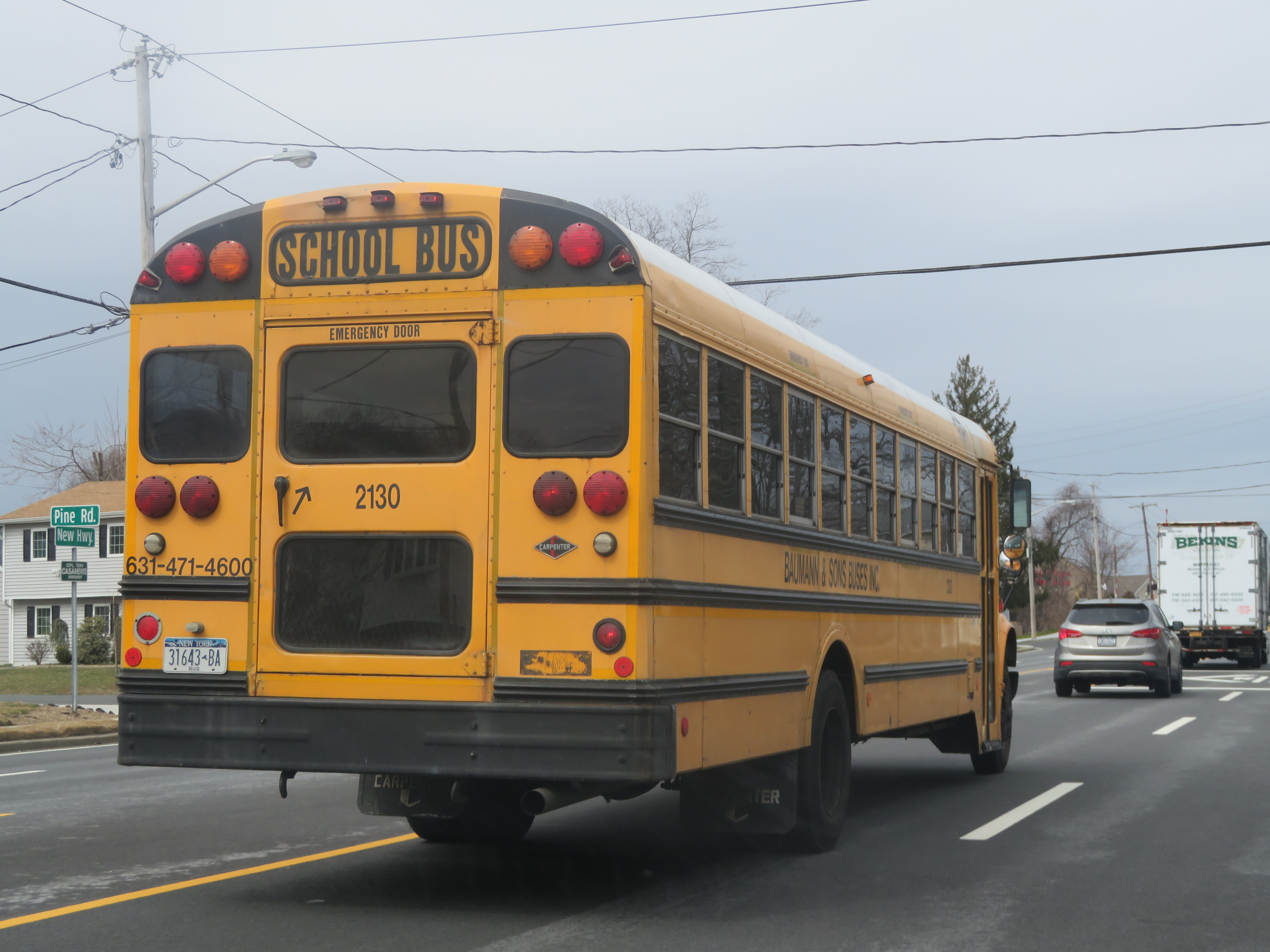
A school bus runs north along CR 28 in North Amityville, New York

Route description

The road begins at NY 27 just west of the intersection of CR 2 (Straight Path), and an Educational Bus Transport garage for school buses and intercity buses of Suffolk County Transit. This section of the road then curves towards the old section which runs along Trinity Cemetery, the site of the former Zahn's Airport, and behind the Sisters of St. Dominic Motherhouse Complex, which was previously known as the Queen of the Rosary Academy. After bi-secting Albany Avenue, the road approaches an at-grade crossing of the Central Branch of the Long Island Rail Road and immediately intersects NY 109. After the immediate intersection with NY 109, CR 28's southern section terminates with the Southern State Parkway, but the roadway continues northward on the south and eastern circumferences of Republic Airport.

North of the industrial zone in East Farmingdale, Republic Road regains the designation of CR 28 at the Babylon/Huntington town line. Republic Road and CR 28 terminates 0.41 miles north of the line at CR 5 (Ruland Road) in Melville; however, just to the east of this terminus is a de facto extension called Maxess Road, which leads to the eastbound service road of the Long Island Expressway between NY 110 and CR 3 (Pinelawn Road). This extension, however, is not included on CR 28's route.

Major intersections

| Location | mi | km | Destinations | Notes |
|---|---|---|---|---|
| North Amityville | 0.00 | 0.00 | NY 27 (Sunrise Highway) – New York, Montauk | |
| North Amityville | 1.23 | 1.98 | Albany Avenue | |
| East Farmingdale | 1.82 | 2.93 | NY 109 / Southern State Parkway west – New York | Exit 33 on Southern Parkway |
| East Farmingdale | 1.90 | 3.06 | Southern State Parkway east – East Islip | Exit 34 on Southern Parkway |
Gap in route designation; connection made via New Highway and Republic Road
| Melville | 0.00 | 0.00 | Town of Babylon/Town of Huntington town line | |
| Melville | 0.41 | 0.66 | Ruland Road (CR 5) | To NY 110 via Ruland Road west |
1.000 mi = 1.609 km; 1.000 km = 0.621 mi

== County Route 29 ==
County Route 29
- Location: Bohemia–Ronkonkoma
- Length: 1.8 mi (2.9 km)

County Route 29 was an unsigned county route connecting CR 93 to the Long Island Expressway. The road was widened during the period that the Ronkonkoma Station was facing major reconstruction itself, and included a replacement for the wooden bridge that previously crossed over the Main Line of the Long Island Rail Road. The CR 29 signs were installed between 1989 and 1995, but have since been taken down.

Within the town of Islip, the road is named Smithtown Avenue. After it crosses the Main Line of the Long Island Rail Road and simultaneously the Town of Islip–Town of Brookhaven town line, it becomes Ronkonkoma Avenue, a name that continues north of the terminus of I-495 until it reaches Hawkins Avenue in Lake Ronkonkoma. The route is no longer recognized by the Suffolk County Department of Public Works nor the New York State Department of Transportation.

Major intersections

| Location | mi | km | Destinations | Notes |
|---|---|---|---|---|
| Bohemia | 0.00 | 0.00 | CR 93 (Lakeland Avenue) – Sayville, MacArthur Airport | To NY 454 via CR 93 south |
| Bohemia | 1.30 | 2.09 | Railroad Avenue – LIRR Commuter Parking | Right-in/right-out connections only |
| Ronkonkoma | 1.80 | 2.90 | I-495 / Ronkonkoma Avenue – New York, Riverhead | Exit 60 on I-495; Ronkonkoma Avenue continues north |
1.000 mi = 1.609 km; 1.000 km = 0.621 mi: Incomplete access

== County Route 30 ==
County Route 30
- Location: Montauk
- Length: 2.9 mi (4.7 km)
- Existed: 1979–present

County Route 30 was the north-south road along the east side of Lake Montauk, known as East Lake Drive. The east side of this road consists of parts of Montauk County Park, a residential enclave, and Montauk Airport. The road terminates at the a parking lot north of the Inlet Seafood Restaurant on the Block Island Sound.

Major intersections

The entire route is located in Montauk.

| mi | km | Destinations | Notes |
|---|---|---|---|
| 0.00 | 0.00 | NY 27 (Montauk Highway) | |
| 2.20 | 3.54 | Montauk Airport | |
| 2.90 | 4.67 | Block Island Sound | Dead end at parking lot with beach access |
1.000 mi = 1.609 km; 1.000 km = 0.621 mi

== County Route 31 ==
County Route 31
- Location: Westhampton Beach–Riverside
- Length: 4.02 mi (6.47 km)
- Existed: 1930–present

County Route 31 is a short north-south county highway running across rural eastern Suffolk County. The road serves as a connection between Westhampton Beach and the Riverhead area, feeding directly into CR 104 as it makes its way north.

Route description

The road begins at Montauk Highway (CR 80), just north of the downtown area of Westhampton Beach. It serves in function as a continuation of Oak Street, which heads south to connect with the town's main street before crossing over to the Dune Road beaches.

Heading north, this arrow-straight portion of the road crosses the Long Island Rail Road's Montauk Branch railroad tracks and then runs through the grounds of Francis S. Gabreski Airport, a former base of the United States Air Force, which is now home to the 106th Rescue Wing of the New York Air National Guard.

North of the base, the road continues through a section of the Long Island Central Pine Barrens, which feature the indigenous dwarf pine. This area fell victim to a widespread wildfire that burned a significant portion of the core of the Pine Barrens in 1995. The section of CR 31 within the village of Westhampton Beach is ceremoniously dedicated "Volunteers Way" in honor of volunteer first responders to the Sunrise Fire.

The road widens as it crosses NY 27, with which it has a full cloverleaf interchange. About one-half mile beyond this interchange, the road ends at a traffic circle with CR 104.

History

Between January 18, 1961 and May 23, 1972, CR 31 was extended south of Montauk Highway between Oak Street and Mill Road (formerly CR 100). Mill Road was intended to be converted into part of the formerly proposed Port Jefferson–Westhampton Beach Highway.

Major intersections

| Location | mi | km | Destinations | Notes |
|---|---|---|---|---|
| Westhampton Beach | 0.00 | 0.00 | CR 80 (Montauk Highway) – Westhampton Beach | Former NY 27A |
| Westhampton | 1.49 | 2.40 | Stewart Avenue / Collins Way – Gabreski Airport | Serves Hampton West Park neighborhood |
| Westhampton | 3.46 | 5.57 | NY 27 (Sunrise Highway) – New York, Montauk | Exits 63S-N on NY 27 |
| Riverside | 4.02 | 6.47 | CR 104 – Riverhead, Quogue, East Quogue | Roundabout |
1.000 mi = 1.609 km; 1.000 km = 0.621 mi

== County Route 32 ==
County Route 32
- Location: Hampton Bays
- Length: 0.53 mi (850 m)
- Existed: 1930–present

County Route 32 is the Ponquogue Bridge, the main two-lane highway between Ponquogue Point on Westhampton Beach Barrier Island and the mainland, which, through a maze of roadways, connects to downtown Hampton Bays. The route used to be designated north of the bridge along Lighthouse Road, Foster Avenue, Shinnecock Road, and Ponquogue Avenue to Montauk Highway in Hampton Bays, but neither the Suffolk County Department of Public Works or the New York State Department of Transportation recognize that portion of the roadway as CR 32, just the Ponquogue Bridge portion. The formerly proposed Ponquogue Causeway was intended to either run parallel to or replace CR 32 between the 1930s and 1960s, but the roadway never came to fruition.

Major intersections

The entire route is in Hampton Bays, New York.

| mi | km | Destinations | Notes |
|---|---|---|---|
| 0.00 | 0.00 | Dune Road | Access to Shinnecock Inlet |
| 0.53– 0.77 | 0.85– 1.24 | Ponquogue Bridge over Shinnecock Bay | |
| 0.77 | 1.24 | Lighthouse Road north | Continues north to Montauk Highway |
1.000 mi = 1.609 km; 1.000 km = 0.621 mi

== County Route 32A ==
County Route 32A
- Location: Hampton Bays
- Existed: 1943–1960s

County Route 32A was concurrent with CR 32 from Montauk Highway to the LIRR station.

== County Route 32B ==
County Route 32B
- Location: Westhampton Beach Barrier Island–Ponquogue
- Existed: 1943–1960s

County Route 32B was Foster Avenue and the former Ponquogue Bridge. It was integrated with CR 32.

== County Route 33 ==
County Route 33
- Location: Amagansett–Napeague
- Length: 3.8 mi (6.1 km)
- Existed: 1930–present

County Route 33 was the designation for Cranberry Hole Road, Promised Land Road, and Napeague Meadow Road. The entire road is a former routing of Montauk Highway.

CR 33 began in Amagansett at the intersection of NY 27 and Bluff Road as Cranberry Hole Road, and carried over the Cranberry Hole Road Bridge above the Montauk Branch of the Long Island Rail Road, the easternmost LIRR bridge to exist. The name Cranberry Hole Road continues until the intersection with Bendigo Road (former CR 33A and CR 74). From there it the road becomes Promised Land Road. Both segments of CR 33 ran along the northern edge of Napeague State Park, and continued to run through the park even as it turns southeast onto Napeague Meadow Road. Promised Land Road continues northeast as Lazy Point Road where it enters "downtown" Napeague.

The former route crosses the LIRR Montauk branch for the second time, but this time it is at an at-grade crossing, where it enters a section of Napeague formerly known as East Hampton Beach, before finally terminating at Montauk Point State Parkway (NY 27).

Major intersections

| Location | mi | km | Destinations | Notes |
|---|---|---|---|---|
| Amagansett | 0.00 | 0.00 | NY 27 (Montauk Highway) / Bluff Road | Bluff Road is a former routing of Montauk Highway |
| Napeague | 1.00 | 1.61 | Bendigo Road | Former CR 74; serves Devon Yacht Club |
| Napeague | 3.80 | 6.12 | NY 27 (Montauk Highway) | |
1.000 mi = 1.609 km; 1.000 km = 0.621 mi

== County Route 33A ==
County Route 33A
- Location: Amagansett–Napeague
- Length: 2.44 mi (3.93 km)
- Existed: 1930–1960s

County Route 33A was for Abrahams Landing Road and Bendigo Road. It was a former suffixed route of CR 33, that is now unmarked CR 74.

== County Route 34 ==
County Route 34
- Location: North Babylon
- Length: 1.34 mi (2.16 km)
- Existed: 1970–present

County Route 34 is Deer Park Avenue between the Village of Babylon/Town of Babylon line and New York State Route 231 in North Babylon. It was a former segment of CR 35 that was established in 1970 when the New York State Department of Transportation created (what was intended to be) a temporary alignment of NY 231.

The Village of Babylon used to maintain the section of CR 34 within the village. However, the New York State Department of Transportation, as well as the Suffolk County Department of Public Works, deems that CR 34 exists outside of the Babylon village limits. Outside of the village limits, CR 34 crosses over New York State Route 27 (Sunrise Highway) as part of Exit 40, which is primarily for NY 231 to the east. Though CR 34 terminates at NY 231 in Deer Park, just south of the Southern State Parkway's exit 39, Deer Park Avenue continues northward as NY 231 well into Dix Hills.

Before its current designation, CR 34 was assigned to Greenlawn Road, today a portion of CR 9 along with Cuba Hill Road, until the late 1960s.

Major intersections

The entire route is located in North Babylon.

| mi | km | Destinations | Notes |
|---|---|---|---|
| 0.00 | 0.00 | Village Line Road / Deer Park Avenue south | Continues into the Village of Babylon |
| 0.40 | 0.64 | To NY 27 (Sunrise Highway) | Access via local roads; exit 40 on NY 27 |
| 1.34 | 2.16 | NY 231 (Deer Park Avenue) | Deer Park Avenue continues north along NY 231; to Southern State Parkway |
1.000 mi = 1.609 km; 1.000 km = 0.621 mi

== County Route 35 ==
County Route 35
- Location: Dix Hills–Huntington
- Length: 7.50 mi (12.07 km)
- Existed: 1930–present

County Route 35 serves as a de facto extension of NY 231, spanning from the northern terminus of NY 231 and the Northern State Parkway in Dix Hills northwest to NY 110 in the hamlet of Huntington. The road originally included NY 231 and CR 34 until 1970, when the New York State Department of Transportation turned the segment between Southern and Northern State Parkways into the temporary alignment of NY 231, before the hopeful transfer of the road onto the formerly proposed Babylon–Northport Expressway. The south end of CR 35 and CR 66 and the north end of NY 231 was intended to include a formerly proposed North Deer Park Avenue Spur leading to the unbuilt expressway.

Route description

The segment of CR 35 between NY 231 and NY 25 is four-lanes wide and is known as Deer Park Road West, as opposed to CR 66, which is known as Deer Park Road East. CR 35 is the last intersection with Old Country Road before both move north and intersect with NY 25. After this intersection, CR 35 narrows down to two lanes and becomes Park Avenue, which turns to the northwest at the 2nd Precinct of the Suffolk County Police Department before intersecting with the southern end of CR 86 (Broadway-Greenlawn) in south Greenlawn. At the north end of Dix Hills Road, the road narrows down to two lanes and contains frontage roads for residences. From there, the road serves as the east end of Maplewood Road, where it briefly overlaps with New York State Bicycle Route 25A until it reaches the west end of Little Plains Road, a block away from Little Plains Park.

The road briefly becomes four lanes wide again at the intersection of CR 11, but narrows back down to two lanes. Continuing northwest, CR 35 has an at-grade crossing with the Port Jefferson Branch of the Long Island Rail Road, which has been the site of many tractor-trailer accidents, and was the original location for the first "Low Ground Clearance" warning sign. The next major intersection after this crossing is Broadway, which runs west towards Huntington Station. Here, CR 35 becomes an unconventional two-lane divided highway, where the divider ends at Tasman Lane. As it goes downhill, CR 35 passes by three Jewish Centers and the Town of Huntington's Hilaire Woods Preserve before approaching the Huntington Arts Cinema at the southwest corner of NY 25A. North of NY 25A, CR 35 runs along the eastern edge of Heckscher Park, makes a northeast turn at Sabbath Day Path, and then passes Huntington Memorial Hospital before reaching NY 110. The two routes share a short concurrency between two traffic circles, before CR 35 exits and proceeds west towards West Shore Road. County Route 35 continues northward, then westward (unsigned) along West Shore Road before officially terminating at Landing Road (just east of Gold Star Beach Park).

Major intersections

| Location | mi | km | Destinations | Notes |
|---|---|---|---|---|
| Dix Hills | 0.00 | 0.00 | NY 231 south CR 66 begins | Continuation south; southern terminus of CR 66 |
| Dix Hills | 0.00 | 0.00 | Northern State Parkway – New York, Hauppauge | Exit 42N on Northern State Parkway |
| Dix Hills | 0.14 | 0.23 | CR 66 north (East Deer Park Road) | North end of CR 66 overlap |
| Elwood | 0.99 | 1.59 | Old Country Road | |
| Elwood | 1.38 | 2.22 | NY 25 (Jericho Turnpike) | |
| Elwood | 1.88 | 3.03 | CR 86 (Broadway) – Greenlawn, Centerport | |
| Huntington Station | 3.60 | 5.79 | CR 11 (Pulaski Road) – Greenlawn | |
| Huntington Station | 4.06 | 6.53 | Broadway | To Huntington Station |
| Huntington | 5.45 | 8.77 | NY 25A (Main Street) – Cold Spring Harbor | |
| Halesite | 6.07 | 9.77 | NY 110 south (New York Avenue) | South end of NY 110 overlap; traffic circle |
| Halesite | 6.17 | 9.93 | NY 110 north (New York Avenue) | North end of NY 110 overlap; roundabout |
| Huntington | 6.53 | 10.51 | West Shore Road | |
| Huntington | 7.50 | 12.07 | Landing Road / Browns Road | Northern terminus |
1.000 mi = 1.609 km; 1.000 km = 0.621 mi: Concurrency terminus

== County Route 35A ==
County Route 35A
- Location: Huntington–Halesite
- Existed: 1930–1960s

County Route 35A was an extension of CR 35 that ran north of NY 25A then made a northeast turn at Sabbath Day Path before reaching NY 110. It was eventually absorbed into CR 35. This segment runs along parkland east of Heckscher Park and is the location of Huntington Memorial Hospital.

== County Route 35B ==
County Route 35B
- Location: Dix Hills–Elwood
- Existed: 1940–1972

County Route 35B was Deer Park Road East and today is CR 66.

== County Route 35C ==
County Route 35C
- Location: Halesite–Huntington
- Existed: 1930–c. 1950

County Route 35C was an extension of CR 35 northwest of NY 110 that included Mill Dam Road, and West Shore Road on the west side of Huntington Harbor. The road was integrated into CR 35; however, it was later transferred to the town of Huntington.

== County Route 36 ==
County Route 36
- Location: East Patchogue–Brookhaven
- Length: 5.65 mi (9.09 km)
- Existed: 1930–present

County Route 36 is a former segment of Montauk Highway known as South Country Road. Though it is signed as an east–west road, it runs southeast to northwest from CR 80 (Montauk Highway) and Lake Drive in East Patchogue into Bellport, and northeast to southwest back to Montauk Highway in the hamlet of Brookhaven. The entire road is two lanes wide, with exceptions for provisions for left turns at some intersections.

Route description

South Country Road begins on the east bank of the Swan River at the intersection of Montauk Highway and Lake Drive, with a four way intersection that includes an eastbound connecting ramp. Almost immediately it crosses the Montauk Branch of the Long Island Rail Road after the intersection of Robinson Avenue. The former East Patchogue Station was located west of this intersection (Hagerman Station was further east along the line). Luxurious houses line the road from most of this point on. The bridge over Robinson Pond has a similar appearance to the one on Montauk Highway over the Forge River between Mastic and Moriches. On the opposite side of Robinson Pond is the Mud Creek County Nature Preserve, a protected area controlled by the Suffolk County Department of Parks and Recreation. Other protected land exists along Strongs Creek and Abet's Creek in Hagerman, the latter of which used to be the location of a greenhouse. The last intersection outside of the village of Bellport is Munsell Road, a pre-automotive era road that once went as far north as West Yaphank.

The 1899-built Bellport County Club serves as the unofficial border of the historic village of Bellport, New York. The intersection with Bellport Avenue to the north and Bellport Lane to the south is the heart of Bellport. Bellport Avenue leads to the town's LIRR station, but also through North Bellport, the edges of Yaphank and Medford, and once lead as far north as Gordon Heights. Bellport Lane, along with CR 36, is one of the streets bordering the Bellport Village Historic District, which has been listed on the National Register of Historic Places since 1980.

Just outside the village at Mott's Brook, CR 36 passes by the Gateway Playhouse, which was established in 1941 on the grounds of a former farm owned by J. L. B. Mott. Well past the intersection of Bellhaven Avenue, the road begins to turn north as it follows the west bank of Beaver Dam Creek, which is hidden off to the east. Very little evidence of this or any other waterway exists along this section of the road until it reaches a hidden driveway leading to a Yacht Club near the southeast corner of Beaver Dam Road. Most of the houses along the road appear to be far more Victorian from this point on. For a moment, the road curves back to the east before intersecting with Fireplace Road, then heads back into a northerly direction. The northeastern end runs beneath a low bridge for the Montauk Branch of the Long Island Rail Road where it intersects with Railroad Avenue (the former location of Brookhaven Station) before finally terminating at Montauk Highway.

History

Originally part of Montauk Highway, the road was created on February 24, 1930, when it shared a designation with NY 27 which was part of Montauk Highway at the time. It was completely turned over to Suffolk County on July 17, 1932, when the state of New York realigned Montauk Highway on the north side of the Montauk Branch of the Long Island Rail Road. Since then it has been used as the main road through the village of Bellport.

Until the late 1980s, flood insurance maps published by the Federal Emergency Management Agency have misrepresented South Country Road as being NY 95. South Country Road has never been either NY 95, nor CR 95.

Major intersections

| Location | mi | km | Destinations | Notes |
|---|---|---|---|---|
| East Patchogue | 0.00 | 0.00 | CR 80 (Montauk Highway) – Patchogue | Former NY 27A |
| Bellport | 3.10 | 4.99 | Station Road | Southern terminus of former CR 64 |
| Community of Brookhaven | 4.70 | 7.56 | Beaver Dam Road | To Bellport High School |
| Community of Brookhaven | 5.65 | 9.09 | CR 80 (Montauk Highway) | Former NY 27A |
1.000 mi = 1.609 km; 1.000 km = 0.621 mi

== County Route 37 ==
County Route 37
- Location: Shelter Island
- Existed: yes

County Route 37 was Manwaring Road on Shelter Island. It began at NY 114 and ran east toward the intersection of Ram Island Road, Saint Mary's Road, and Manhassett Road.

== County Route 38 ==
County Route 38
- Location: Southampton–North Sea
- Length: 2.53 mi (4.07 km)
- Existed: 1931–present

County Route 38 is the connector road along between the village of Southampton and North Sea. It begins at the intersection of NY 27/CR 39 on the north border of the Village of Southampton. After this intersection, it continues northwest towards Tuckahoe, where it approaches the northern terminus of CR 52 (Sandy Hollow Road), and moves directly north towards the hamlet of North Sea. The route ends 500 feet north of the intersection with Millstone Brook Road, just before the roadway reaches the "downtown" portion of North Sea. CR 38 used to continue eastward from North Sea to Noyack via Noyack Road, and, eventually, Sag Harbor. The route's mileage and designation is only recognized by the SCDPW or by the New York State Department of Transportation between Southampton Village and North Sea.

History

As far back as the 1930s the road was planned to be extended along the north shore of the South Fork of Long Island to the Amagansett–Promised Land area. Besides the existing segment of North Sea Road (and the former segment of Noyack Road), the new segment was to begin at the intersection of Brick Kiln Road then continue southeast until it reaches Town Line Road, where it would curve east. The CR 38 extension would gradually move southeast again, running along the headwaters of Northwest Creek and Three Mile Harbor, through Barnes Hole, and Devon until reaching Promised Land Road (former CR 33), which it would replace until it reached NY 27 (Montauk Point State Parkway) in the East Hampton Beach section of Napeague. Though the extension was dropped due to anti-highway sentiment, the official description used to include the extension, which was 25 miles.

Major intersections

| Location | mi | km | Destinations | Notes |
|---|---|---|---|---|
| Village of Southampton | 0.00 | 0.00 | NY 27 / CR 39 west / CR 39A east | Continues south to Southampton Village |
| Tuckahoe | 1.33 | 2.14 | CR 52 south (Sandy Hollow Road) | Northern terminus of CR 52 |
| North Sea | 2.53 | 4.07 | North Sea Road – Noyack, Sag Harbor | County maintenance ends 500 feet (150 m) north of Millstone Brook Road |
1.000 mi = 1.609 km; 1.000 km = 0.621 mi

== County Route 38A ==
County Route 38A
- Location: Noyack–North Haven
- Existed: 1931–1970s

County Route 38A is a former spur of CR 38 known as Noyack–Long Beach Road. Today the road is designated as CR 60.

== County Route 39 ==
County Route 39
- Location: Shinnecock Hills–Tuckahoe
- Length: 5.83 mi (9.38 km)
- Existed: 1931–present

County Route 39 is North Highway in the town of Southampton. Most of the road is concurrent with NY 27, where it is known as the Southampton Bypass, except for the portion along the Shinnecock Canal and the Great Peconic Bay. This section has an interchange with NY 27, both at the beginning of the freeway portion (Sunrise Highway) and the first interchange (exit 66). The multiplex between NY 27 and CR 39 was only meant to be temporary, since NY 27 was proposed to be moved to the Sunrise Highway Extension.

Like CR 38, Suffolk County was planning to extend CR 39 east of Flying Point Road through CR 79 (Bridgehampton–Sag Harbor Turnpike) at the proposed Sunrise Highway Extension, and if necessary as a substitute for the Sunrise Highway Extension. These plans also date back to the 1930s, and included what became part of the proposed Sunrise Highway extension.

Major intersections

| Location | mi | km | Destinations | Notes |
|---|---|---|---|---|
| Shinnecock Hills | 0.00 | 0.00 | CR 80 (Montauk Highway) – Hampton Bays | Former NY 27A |
| Shinnecock Hills | 0.29 | 0.47 | NY 27 east / CR 39B east (Canal Road) – Montauk | Western terminus of CR 39B; exit 66 on NY 27 |
| Shinnecock Hills | 0.74 | 1.19 | NY 27 west / CR 39B west – New York | Eastern terminus of CR 39B; exit 66 on NY 27 |
| Shinnecock Hills | 1.86 | 2.99 | NY 27 west (Sunrise Highway) – New York | Gap in route for eastbound CR 39 (connection made via exit 66); western terminus of concurrency with NY 27 |
| Tuckahoe | 2.97 | 4.78 | Tuckahoe Road – Stony Brook Southampton | |
| Tuckahoe | 5.13 | 8.26 | CR 52 north (Sandy Hollow Road) | Southern terminus of CR 52 |
| Village of Southampton | 5.83 | 9.38 | NY 27 east / CR 39A east (Southampton Bypass) / CR 38 north - North Sea, Southampton | Southern terminus of CR 38; western terminus of CR 39A |
1.000 mi = 1.609 km; 1.000 km = 0.621 mi: Concurrency terminus

== County Route 39A ==
County Route 39A
- Location: Tuckahoe - Village of Southampton
- Length: 0.62 mi (1,000 m)

County Route 39A is a little known suffixed route that runs concurrent with NY 27 (also known as North Highway or the Southampton Bypass) between North Sea Road and Montauk Highway. East of David Whites Lane, CR 39 was intended to be rerouted onto the formerly proposed Hampton Bays–Amagansett Road. While all businesses on this short stretch of highway use "County Road 39A" for the street name, it commonly known as part of CR 39. The entire route is signed as CR 39.

Major intersections

| Location | mi | km | Destinations | Notes |
|---|---|---|---|---|
| Village of Southampton | 0.00 | 0.00 | NY 27 west / CR 39 west (Southampton Bypass) / CR 38 north - North Sea, Southampton | Southern terminus of CR 38; eastern terminus of CR 39 |
| Village of Southampton | 0.53 | 0.85 | North Main Street – Southampton | Access to Southampton LIRR Station |
| Tuckahoe | 0.85 | 1.37 | David Whites Lane | Site of formerly proposed Hampton Bays–Amagansett Road |
| Village of Southampton | 1.47 | 2.37 | NY 27 east (Montauk Highway) – Bridgehampton, East Hampton | NY 27 continues east |
1.000 mi = 1.609 km; 1.000 km = 0.621 mi: Concurrency terminus

== County Route 39B ==
County Route 39B
- Location: Shinnecock Hills
- Length: 0.73 mi (1,170 m)

County Route 39B is Canal Road East and Old North Highway on the east side of the Shinnecock Canal. The road runs beneath the Sunrise Highway (NY 27) bridge over the Canal, just as CR 39 does, and provides closer access to Meschutt Beach County Park.

Major intersections

The entire route is in Shinnecock Hills.

| mi | km | Destinations | Notes |
|---|---|---|---|
| 0.00 | 0.00 | CR 39 / NY 27 east – Montauk | Exit 66 on NY 27 east |
| 0.73 | 1.17 | CR 39 / NY 27 west – New York | Exit 66 on NY 27 west |
1.000 mi = 1.609 km; 1.000 km = 0.621 mi

== County Route 40 ==
County Route 40
- Location: East Hampton North–Springs
- Length: 2.51 mi (4.04 km)
- Existed: 1931–present

County Route 40 is known as Three Mile Harbor Road, and extends from the East Hampton village line in East Hampton North to Copeces Lane in Springs.

Route description

CR 40 begins north of the North Main Street Historic District at the East Hampton village line at Cedar Street. The route starts north of the bridge under the Montauk Branch of the Long Island Rail Road. The first major intersection north of the historic district (and the southern terminus of CR 40) is Cedar Street, which leads to Cedar Point County Park, and the second one is CR 41 (Springs Fireplace Road).

A fork in the road for Springy Banks Road is the southern border Three Mile Harbor, both the waterway and the former hamlet. This road leads motorists northwest to Lafarges Landing and Sammy's Beach, while CR 40 continues to the northeast as it passes by East Hampton Marina, Three Mile Harbor Boat Yard, and Gardiner's Marina. After passing Gardiner's Marina, the designation for CR 40 ends at Copeces Lane, just to the south of Marina Lane Waterside Park.

Major intersections

| Location | mi | km | Destinations | Notes |
|---|---|---|---|---|
| East Hampton North | 0.00 | 0.00 | North Main Street / Cedar Street | Continues south without designation to NY 27 |
| East Hampton North | 0.24 | 0.39 | CR 41 north (Springs Fireplace Road) – Springs | Southern terminus of CR 41 |
| Springs | 2.51 | 4.04 | Copeces Lane / Three Mile Harbor Hog Creek Road north | Continues north without designation |
1.000 mi = 1.609 km; 1.000 km = 0.621 mi

== County Route 40A ==
County Route 40A
- Location: East Hampton
- Existed: 1931–post-1960s

County Route 40A was concurrent with CR 40 along Three Mile Harbor Road until after the 1960s.

== County Route 41 ==
County Route 41
- Location: East Hampton North–Springs
- Length: 3.00 mi (4.83 km)
- Existed: 1931–present

County Route 41 is Springs–Fireplace Road, which spans from East Hampton to Springs. Though CR 41 terminates at CR 45 in Springs, Springs–Fireplace Road continues north into the Springs.

Major intersections

| Location | mi | km | Destinations | Notes |
|---|---|---|---|---|
| East Hampton North | 0.00 | 0.00 | CR 40 (Three Mile Harbor Road) | |
| East Hampton North | 1.62 | 2.61 | Abrahams Path | To Amagansett |
| Springs | 3.00 | 4.83 | Woodbine Drive / Springs Fireplace Road northbound | Continues north without designation |
1.000 mi = 1.609 km; 1.000 km = 0.621 mi

== County Route 42 ==
County Route 42
- Location: Shelter Island Heights
- Length: 1.20 mi (1.93 km)

County Route 42 is a short, partially-unsigned east-west county road in the hamlet of Shelter Island Heights, in the town of Shelter Island. It is known as Shore Road, and extends from Rocky Point Road on the west shore of Shelter Island to West Neck Road (CR 115).

Major intersections

The entire route is in Shelter Island Heights.

| mi | km | Destinations | Notes |
|---|---|---|---|
| 0.00 | 0.00 | Rocky Point Road | |
| 1.05 | 1.69 | Sunnyside Drive | To Shelter Island Country Club |
| 1.20 | 1.93 | West Neck Road (CR 115 east) – Ferries, Silver Beach, Westmoreland | Western terminus of CR 115 |
1.000 mi = 1.609 km; 1.000 km = 0.621 mi

== County Route 43 ==
County Route 43
- Location: Riverhead–Northville
- Length: 3.43 mi (5.52 km)
- Existed: 1931–present

County Route 43, known as Northville Turnpike for its entire length, is a county route contained completely within the township of Riverhead. It heads north-northeast from Downtown Riverhead towards the North Shore of Long Island, ending at Sound Avenue in the hamlet of Northville, New York.

Route description

County Route 43 begins at Roanoke Avenue (CR 73) just north of its crossing with the Long Island Rail Road Main Line tracks. After cutting a slice through part of downtown Riverhead, CR 43 heads off in an almost-straight path towards the North Shore. After crossing Old Country Road (CR 58), CR 43 enters the farm fields that characterize much of Riverhead town. The road crosses CR 105 just before its terminus at Sound Avenue.

History

Originally, CR 43's southern terminus was on Roanoke Avenue at NY 25 (Main Street) in Downtown Riverhead. The southern terminus was truncated in 1943, when CR 73 took over Roanoke Avenue.

Major intersections

| Location | mi | km | Destinations | Notes |
|---|---|---|---|---|
| Community of Riverhead | 0.00 | 0.00 | CR 73 (Roanoke Avenue) | To Riverhead LIRR Station |
| Community of Riverhead | 1.15 | 1.85 | CR 58 (Old Country Road) | To I-495 and NY 25 |
| Community of Riverhead | 2.88 | 4.63 | CR 105 – Westhampton, Montauk | At-grade intersection |
| Northville | 3.43 | 5.52 | Sound Avenue | |
1.000 mi = 1.609 km; 1.000 km = 0.621 mi

== County Route 44 ==
County Route 44
- Location: North Haven

County Route 44, was an unbuilt county road along the west side of NY 114 in North Haven that was intended to be four-lanes wide and take motorists to a new bridge across the southern Shelter Island Sound. Suffolk County Department of Public Works had also hoped it would be acquired by the NYSDOT as a realignment for NY 114.

== County Route 45 ==
County Route 45
- Location: Amagansett–Springs
- Length: 5.8 mi (9.3 km)
- Existed: 1931–present

County Route 45 was primarily known the designation for Old Stone Highway (Springs–Amagansett Road), Springs-Fireplace Road, and Hog Creek Road.

Route description

CR 45 began at NY 27 as Abrahams Landing Road, where it instantly crossed the Montauk Branch of the Long Island Rail Road at Amagansett Station, and immediately made a left-turn onto Old Stone Highway (Springs–Amagansett Road) at the South Fork Country Club. The route slanted to the north as it approached the intersection of Town Lane, and then to the northeast. From here, the route continued into Springs, at a former hamlet known as Barnes Hole, where it encounters Red Dirt Road, Barnes Hole Road, and the south end of Neck Path. The route continued to move northeast, but suddenly curved northwest in order to avoid Accabonac Cliff, which is accessible from a side road called Louise Point Road. CR 45 intersected at Neck Path again east of the former hamlet of Kingstown, but this time it merges with the former route and then immediately turns onto Accabonac Road. Curving back to the northwest, CR 45 passed by the Springs General Store, then over a creek leading to Pussys Pond, and instantly intersected a fork in the road at Parsons Place, which leads to the historic Charles Parsons Blacksmith Building as well as the NRHP-listed Ambrose Parsons House. In between both roads are the Springs Cannon, Ashawagh Hall, and for CR 45, the Springs Community Presbyterian Church on the opposite side. In front of the church, Springs–Amagansett Road/Old Stone Highway curves to the right, until it reaches a wye at Springs–Fireplace Road, thus serving as the former northern terminus of CR 41.

This segment of Springs–Fireplace Road is where one can find the NRHP-listed Pollock-Krasner House and Studio. The rest of the road runs along the northwest shore of Accabonac Harbor, along preserved land such as the Meadow Lake and Kaplan Meadows Sanctuaries. CR 45 made a sharp left turn onto Hog Creek Road, and headed north again while Springs–Fireplace Road continues towards Fireplace in Gardiners Bay, as well as a former hamlet called Gerard Park. Along Hog Creek Road, CR 45 skirted the border of Springs and Fireplace, until the intersection of Kings Point Road where it made a sharp left onto Three Mile Harbor Road and terminated at the former northern terminus of CR 40.

Major intersections

| Location | mi | km | Destinations | Notes |
|---|---|---|---|---|
| Amagansett | 0.00 | 0.00 | NY 27 (Main Street) | |
| Amagansett | 0.06 | 0.097 | Abrahams Landing Road | Western terminus of former CR 74 |
| Springs | 4.00 | 6.44 | Springs Fireplace Road | Former northern terminus of CR 41 |
| Springs | 5.80 | 9.33 | Three Mile Harbor Hog Creek Road / Kings Point Road | Former northern terminus of CR 40 |
1.000 mi = 1.609 km; 1.000 km = 0.621 mi

== County Route 46 ==
County Route 46
- Location: Smith Point Park–East Shoreham
- Length: 15.37 mi (24.74 km)
- Existed: March 30, 1931–present

County Route 46 is the county designation for William Floyd Parkway, a four-lane highway spanning from Smith Point County Park to almost near Wading River.

== County Route 46A ==
County Route 46A
- Location: Upton

County Route 46A was the original designation for the alignment along the west side of Brookhaven National Laboratory between Yaphank–Moriches Road and south of the unnumbered interchange with NY 25. It was eventually integrated as part of CR 46 while the old CR 46 (Upton Road) was abandoned to both the lab and private developers.

== County Route 47 ==
County Route 47
- Location: Copiague–East Farmingdale
- Length: 3.77 mi (6.07 km)
- Existed: 1931–present

County Route 47 is the designation for Great Neck Road from NY 27A in Copiague through NY 110 in East Farmingdale until it reaches the Nassau–Suffolk county line in East Farmingdale.

Route description

CR 47 is almost entirely two lanes, with a center-left-turn lane, except at its southern terminus at NY 27A. Aside from the Copiague Fire Department and a school or two, the street is almost entirely residential until the intersection of Hollywood Avenue. There, the route becomes a commercial strip, especially as it approaches CR 12 (Oak Street), which once carried a streetcar line between Amityville and Babylon. One block later CR 47 runs beneath Copiague Station.

The commercial zoning ends at the intersection of Campagnoli Avenue. Scattered commercial operations can be found near the intersection with CR 2 (Dixon Avenue) which spans from Amityville to Dix Hills, but, for the most part, the road remains primarily residential.

As the road runs along the west side of Copiague Middle School, it approaches the cloverleaf interchange with NY 27, where CR 47 becomes a two-lane divided highway. After the interchange with NY 27, the road resumes its status as a two-lane corridor (with a center-left-turn lane) and shifts from north and south to northwest and southeast at the intersection of Bethpage Road. The next major intersection is Albany Avenue, which spans from downtown Amityville to the Sisters of St. Dominic Motherhouse Complex.

Prior to reaching the intersection of NY 110, CR 47 runs over the Southern State Parkway and a former gas station that existed in the median until 1985. It also shared an interchange with the Parkway until the 1950s. Though CR 47 continues north of NY 110, it ceases to be a county road one block away, when it crosses the Nassau County line and becomes South Main Street in both South Farmingdale and Farmingdale.

Major intersections

| Location | mi | km | Destinations | Notes |
|---|---|---|---|---|
| Copiague | 0.00 | 0.00 | NY 27A (Montauk Highway) | |
| Copiague | 0.82 | 1.32 | CR 12 (Oak Street) | To Copiague Station |
| Copiague | 1.19 | 1.92 | CR 2 (Dixon Avenue) | |
| Copiague | 1.61 | 2.59 | NY 27 – New York, Montauk | Cloverleaf interchange |
| North Amityville | 3.58 | 5.76 | NY 110 | To Southern State Parkway |
| North Amityville | 3.77 | 6.07 | Main Street north | Continuation into Nassau County |
1.000 mi = 1.609 km; 1.000 km = 0.621 mi

== County Route 48 ==
County Route 48
- Location: Mattituck–Greenport
- Length: 13.6 mi (21.9 km)
- Existed: 1988–present

County Route 48 is the designation for Middle Road on the North Fork of Long Island between Mattituck and Greenport. It was intended to be converted into an extension of the Long Island Expressway, and was originally designated CR 27. The route includes New York State Route 25 Truck for its entire length.

== County Route 49 ==
County Route 49
- Location: Montauk
- Length: 2.84 mi (4.57 km)

County Route 49 runs south-to-north from NY 27 in Montauk to the loop on the west side of Lake Montauk. It starts along the east side of Fort Pond Bay as Edgemere Street, and then onto Flamingo Avenue before reaching Montauk Station. From this point, the road moves northeast above Fort Pond Bay before reaching CR 77.

Major intersections

The entire route is in Montauk.

| mi | km | Destinations | Notes |
|---|---|---|---|
| 0.00 | 0.00 | NY 27 (Main Street) | Access via Carl Fisher Plaza |
| 1.12 | 1.80 | Montauk Station | |
| | | East Flamingo Avenue | Formerly CR 95, later a former section of CR 49 |
| 2.84 | 4.57 | CR 77 (West Lake Drive) | CR 77 loops around West Lake Drive from this intersection and terminates |
1.000 mi = 1.609 km; 1.000 km = 0.621 mi

== County Route 50 ==
County Route 50
- Location: Babylon–Great River
- Length: 9.93 mi (15.98 km)
- Existed: 1932–present

County Route 50 is an east-west county road running from Babylon to Great River, paralleling the Montauk Branch of the Long Island Rail Road. The road serves as a commuter-feeder route in southwestern Suffolk County. Most of the road is two lanes wide, although there are some areas where it opens up to four lanes or simply allows center-left-turn lanes.

Route description

CR 50 begins at the intersection of New York State Route 109 in the village of Babylon, north of the Montauk Branch of the Long Island Rail Road as Park Avenue. The route straddles northward on Deer Park Avenue for three-tenths of a mile to find its way onto Simon Street but this name doesn't carry the designation very long. At the intersection of Cedar and Cooper streets, CR 50 makes a sharp right turn along Cooper Street to cross under the tracks, which then immediately makes a left onto John Street along the south side of the Montauk Branch. For a slightly longer distance until reaching the quarter cloverleaf interchange with New York State Route 231 (NY 231, the Babylon–Northport Expressway) on the Babylon Village–West Islip border, the road suddenly takes on the name "Union Boulevard", the street that defines CR 50. Union Boulevard continues to carry CR 50 along the south side of the Montauk Branch of the Long Island Rail Road for the rest of its length to the hamlet of Great River.

East of the intersection of CR 82 (Higbie Lane), CR 50 runs beneath a pedestrian-railroad bridge that spans between a shopping center and the intersection of Orinoco Drive and Patricia Avenue across the Montauk Branch, and another limited-access highway known as the Robert Moses Causeway in West Islip. Unlike the Babylon-Northport Expressway, no access to the Causeway is provided. The bridge that carries the Robert Moses Causeway over Union Boulevard also carries it over the LIRR railroad tracks. After passing through the northern sections of West Bay Shore and the village of Brightwaters, CR 50 approaches southbound-only Clinton Avenue (CR 13A) and northbound-only Fifth Avenue (CR 13) in Bay Shore. Continuing eastward on the south side of Bay Shore's LIRR train station, CR 50 then intersects with CR 57 (Third Avenue).

The last major intersection within Bay Shore is Brentwood Road, although Saxon Avenue also leads through NY 27. While Union Boulevard runs south of the railroad tracks, another street called Moffit Boulevard runs parallel on the north side of the tracks, which runs between Brentwood Road and Carleton Avenue (CR 17). As the road enters the heart of the hamlet of Islip, CR 50 intersects Nassau Avenue and, more importantly, NY 111 (the two streets that serve Islip's train station). Shortly after passing over the north end of Knapp Lake and Champlin Creek, the road curves somewhat further southeast as it intersects Irish Avenue where it passes the Islip Art Museum and, then with, Carleton Avenue (CR 17) in East Islip, which was originally a segment of NY 111 until 1966.

Union Boulevard runs beneath a third limited-access road between East Islip and Great River, Heckscher State Parkway. No access to this parkway is provided, however Exit 45W on the parkway leads to Harwood Road, which takes commuters to both NY 27A and CR 50. From the parkway bridge, the road enters both county and state protected areas. CR 50 then intersects with Connetquot Avenue south of Great River's train station. The road finally terminates at an at-grade interchange with NY 27A and the entrance to the Bayard Cutting Arboretum.

Major intersections

| Location | mi | km | Destinations | Notes |
|---|---|---|---|---|
| Village of Babylon | 0.00 | 0.00 | NY 109 (Little East Neck Road) | |
| Village of Babylon | 1.52 | 2.45 | NY 231 north | Parclo interchange |
| West Islip | 1.94 | 3.12 | CR 82 (Higbie Lane) | |
| Bay Shore | 4.80 | 7.72 | CR 13A south (Clinton Avenue) | One-way southbound |
| Bay Shore | 4.89 | 7.87 | CR 13 north (Fifth Avenue) | One-way northbound; to Bay Shore Station |
| Bay Shore | 5.25 | 8.45 | CR 57 north | To Bay Shore High School |
| East Islip | 7.51 | 12.09 | NY 111 (Islip Avenue) – Central Islip | Access to Islip Train Station. |
| East Islip | 8.39 | 13.50 | CR 17 (Carleton Avenue) – Bethpage Ballpark | Former NY 111 |
| Great River | 9.60 | 15.45 | To NY 27 | Access via Connetquot Avenue |
| Great River | 9.93 | 15.98 | NY 27A (Montauk Highway) | |
1.000 mi = 1.609 km; 1.000 km = 0.621 mi

== County Route 50A ==
County Route 50A
- Location: Oakdale–Sayville

County Route 50A was reserved for the unbuilt Union Boulevard Extension between Oakdale and Sayville. This 1964 proposal was to run mostly along the north side of the Montauk Branch of the LIRR, terminating east of the low railroad bridge over Montauk Highway in Sayville.

== County Route 50B ==
County Route 50B
- Location: Amityville

County Route 50B was Oak Street, Railroad Avenue, and Trolley Line Road from Amityville at the Nassau–Suffolk county line to Babylon at Deer Park Avenue. Today, it is CR 12.

== County Route 50C ==
County Route 50C
- Location: Babylon

County Route 50C was Park Avenue between NY 109 and Deer Park Avenue within Babylon. This was a proposed extension that was phased out during the mid-1980s, although Suffolk County Department of Public Works still lists this street as being part of CR 50.
