= Parsons House =

Parsons House can refer to:

== United Kingdom ==
- Parsons House, London, a residential skyscraper in Westminster

== United States ==
(by state, then city/town)

- Gridley-Parsons-Staples Homestead, Farmington, Connecticut, listed on the National Register of Historic Places (NRHP) in Hartford County
- Samuel Parsons House, Wallingford, Connecticut, listed on the NRHP in New Haven County
- Stephen Parsons House, Edgecomb, Maine, listed on the NRHP in Lincoln County
- Marion Parsons House, Fryeburg, Maine, listed on the NRHP in Oxford County
- Robinson-Parsons Farm, Paris, Maine, listed on the NRHP in Oxford County
- Parsons-Piper-Lord-Roy Farm, Parsonsfield, Maine, listed on the NRHP in York County
- Josiah K. Parsons Homestead, Wiscasset, Maine, listed on the NRHP in Lincoln County
- Edward Parsons House, Newton, Massachusetts, listed on the NRHP in Middlesex County
- C.H. Parsons House, Crystal Springs, Mississippi, listed on the NRHP in Copiah County
- Parsons Homestead, Rye, New Hampshire, listed on the NRHP in Rockingham County
- Ambrose Parsons House, Springs, New York, listed on the NRHP in Suffolk County
- John and Elsie Parsons House, Forest Grove, Oregon, listed on the NRHP in Washington County
- Parsons-Taylor House, Easton, Pennsylvania, listed on the NRHP in Northampton County
- Booth-Parsons House, Salt Lake City, Utah, listed on the NRHP in Salt Lake County
- William Parsons House, Seattle, Washington, listed on the NRHP in King County
