= Ponquogue Parkway =

Highway on Long Island, New York

Ponquogue Parkway

Route information
- Maintained by NYSDOT
- History: Formerly proposed parkway

Major junctions
- South end: Ocean Parkway in Tiana Beach
- North end: Possible endpoints: NY 27 in Hampton Bays; Southern State Parkway extension in Hampton Bays

Location
- Country: United States
- State: New York
- Counties: Suffolk

Highway system
- New York Highways; Interstate; US; State; Reference; Parkways

In 1938, after the destruction to Fire Island from the Long Island Express hurricane, Robert Moses and W. Earle Andrews, both part of the Long Island State Park Commission, proposed reconstruction of the island. This proposal included an extension of the Ocean Parkway out from its terminus at Captree State Park across Fire Island to Westhampton. This new parkway, which would boast 22 feet (6.7 m) wide roadways, would have connections back to the mainland at Smith Point County Park and Ponquogue with parkway spurs across Shinnecock Bay and the Great South Bay. The new spur at Ponquogue, deemed the Ponquogue Parkway, would have marked the eastern terminus of the new Ocean Parkway extension. The proposal lived until the cut-back to Smith Point County Park in 1962 for environmental issues with such a construction, ending any proposal for a parkway in the area of Hampton Bays.

== History ==
After the destruction caused to Fire Island because of the 1938 Long Island Express hurricane, Robert Moses, director of the Long Island State Park Commission (LISPC) proposed reconstruction of Fire Island to restrain future damage from other natural disasters. The $9.3 million proposal, designed by Moses and W. Earle Andrews, would bring 35,000,000 cubic yards (940,000,000 cu ft) of sand to bolster Fire Island. This sand would create a complete fill from Fire Island Inlet to the United States Coast Guard station at Shinnecock. These new fills would be approximately 80 feet (24 m) wide and would also go to working on Moriches Inlet and Shinnecock Inlet. Sand would also be dredged from the Great South Bay, Moriches Bay and Shinnecock Bay to boost the effort of shoring Fire Island. To control erosion on Fire Island, Moses and Andrews proposed a brand new 30 feet (9.1 m) wide two-lane parkway over the fill. The 22 feet (6.7 m) wide concrete lanes and the 8 feet (2.4 m) turf shoulders would help prevent the beach erosion along the island.

In the need for these new parkways, Moses and Andrews also proposed two parkway spurs across the Great South Bay and Shinnecock Bay. These parkway spurs, which would use bascule lift bridges, were to connect to the William Floyd Parkway (current-day CR 46) and Ponquogue Avenue (current-day CR 32), which would cross their respective bodies of water and terminate at a junction with Montauk Highway (NY 27A) in Shirley and Hampton Bays. Deemed locally as the Ponquogue Parkway, but also considered an extension of the Ocean Parkway, the new 47.5 miles (76.4 km) parkway proposal would also bring forth three new parks into the New York State Parks system: Smith Point (replacing the current-day Smith Point County Park), Point O'Woods (in the namesake community) and Quogue. Fire Island State Park would also be rebuilt. Within that year, Andrews sliced over $6 million off of the project, eliminating a bridge over Fire Island Inlet along with the state parks at Quogue and Point O'Woods. The other 1938 change would be a new turnoff in Hampton Bays rather than construction out to Southampton and NY 27A. This money would be paid for by Suffolk County and by a grant from the Public Works Administration.

This proposal was opposed to by locals due to its costs in 1938, but raised again in 1944 by Moses due to the belief that no storms would ever hit the area again. In 1962, Moses brought, with support of a 15-member commission that approved a $137 million (1962 USD) shoreline plan from Tottenville, Staten Island to Montauk, a truncated proposal that would extend the Ocean Parkway across most of Fire Island to a junction in Smith Point County Park rather than all the way out to Shinnecock. Residents of Fire Island argued that the time it would take to construct the new parkway would take too long and should invest in a temporary solution for protection of the island. At that time, the group funding the project stated that all it would need to construct this new parkway was approval of the New York State Legislature. Suffolk County and the state also intended to withhold funds from any project that did not have the parkway extension.

== Exit list for proposed parkway ==
The entire route is in Suffolk County. All exits are unnumbered.

Location	mi	km	Destinations	Notes
Fire Island	0.0	0.0	Ocean Parkway west	Eastern terminus of proposed Ocean Parkway extension across Fire Island
Shinnecock Bay			Ponquogue Bridge	
Hampton Bays	47.5	76.4	Local streets	
1.000 mi = 1.609 km; 1.000 km = 0.621 mi
