= AYZ =

AYZ may be a code for:

- Atlant-Soyuz Airlines
- Zahn's Airport

ayz is the ISO 630 code for the Maybrat language
