= Hall Place (disambiguation) =

Hall Place may refer to:

- Hall Place, Grade I listed building, London Borough of Bexley, England
- Hall Place Estate, Westminster, housing estate in Westminster
- Hall Place (Bentworth), Grade II listed building, Hampshire, England
- Hall Place (Manhattan), the former name of Taras Shevchenko Place, a street in Manhattan, New York City, United States.
- Hall Place now known as Oakley Hall, Hampshire, Georgian manor at Oakley near Basingstoke, England.
