= New York State Route 231 =

Highway on Long Island, New York

New York State Route 231
- Map of Suffolk County on Long Island with NY 231 highlighted in red

Route information
- Maintained by NYSDOT
- Length: 9.05 mi (14.56 km)
- Existed: 1960s–present

Major junctions
- South end: NY 27A in Babylon
- NY 27 in North Babylon; Southern State Parkway in North Babylon; I-495 in Dix Hills
- North end: CR 35 / CR 66 / Northern State Parkway in Dix Hills

Location
- Country: United States
- State: New York
- Counties: Suffolk

Highway system
- New York Highways; Interstate; US; State; Reference; Parkways
| ← NY 230 | → NY 232 |

New York State Route 231 (NY 231) is a 9.05-mile (14.56 km) long state highway located in Suffolk County, on Long Island, in New York, in the United States. The route extends north–south from a partial interchange with NY 27A in the Incorporated Village of Babylon to an interchange with the Northern State Parkway in Dix Hills.

The southernmost 2 miles (3.2 km) of NY 231 is an expressway known simply and only as Route 231. This section of the road was originally built to be part of the Babylon–Northport Expressway, a failed highway project that was never completed. The remainder of NY 231 is part of Deer Park Avenue.

== Route description ==
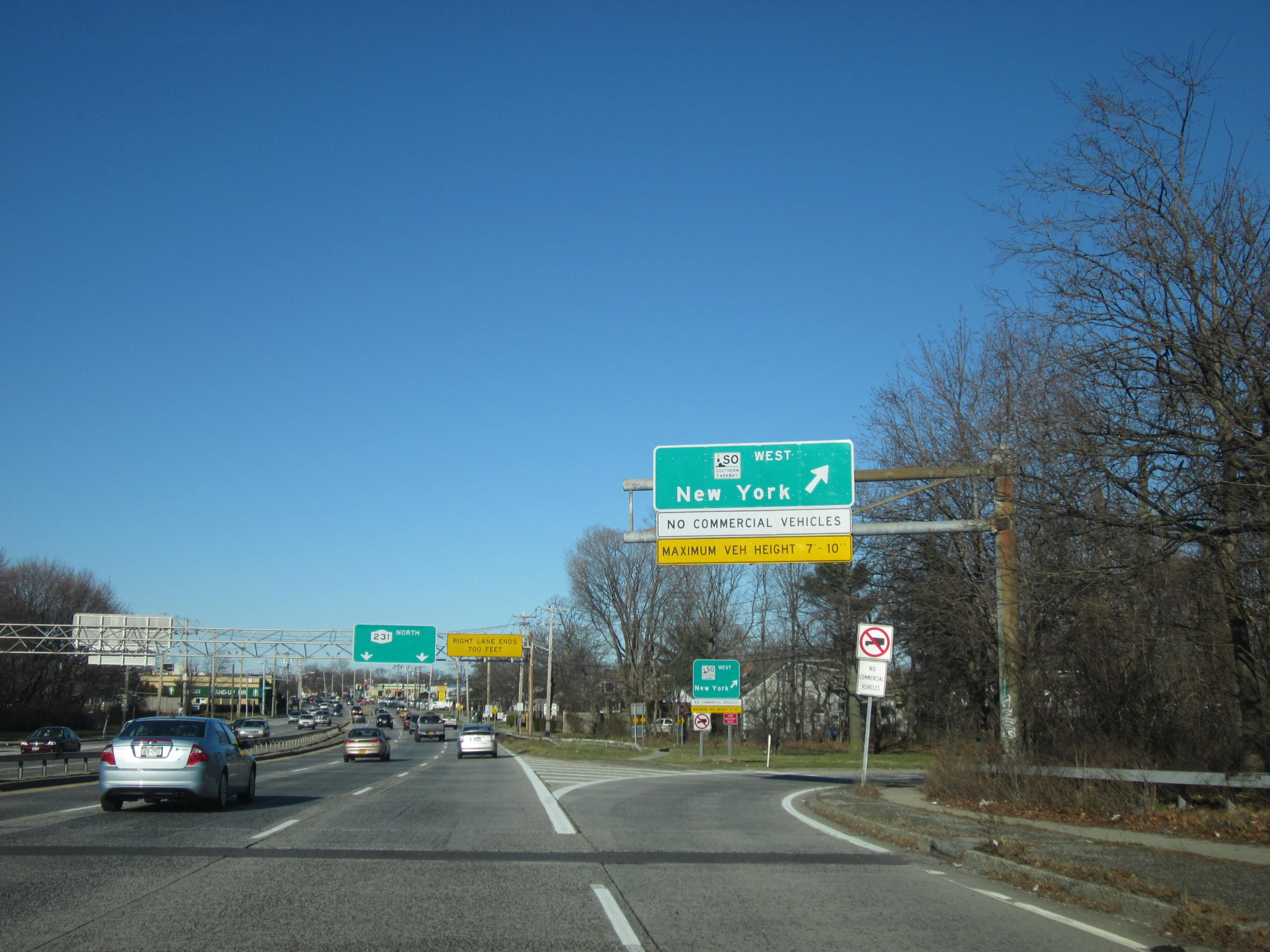
NY 231 northbound at the Southern State Parkway in North Babylon

=== South of the Southern State Parkway ===
NY 231 begins at an intersection with NY 27A (Montauk Highway) in the Incorporated Village of Babylon. From there, the route progresses northward around Hawleys Lake as a four-lane freeway. A short distance north of NY 27A, NY 231 meets ramps from County Route 50 (John Street), but only provides service to the county road from the southbound direction.

After John Street, the freeway crosses over the Long Island Rail Road's Montauk Branch, and thence continues northward through a large residential district. After paralleling Madison Street in North Babylon, NY 231 reaches a full cloverleaf interchange with NY 27 (Sunrise Highway).

From NY 27, NY 231 heads northward and northwestward, intersecting with Hunter Avenue in North Babylon, where it becomes a four-lane expressway. The route curves back to the north through the large commercial district, interchanging with CR 34 (Deer Park Avenue). Just north of its interchange with CR 34, NY 231 reaches a full cloverleaf interchange with the Southern State Parkway, still in North Babylon.

=== North of the Southern State Parkway ===
From its interchange with the Southern State Parkway, NY 231 continues northward as a four-lane boulevard named Deer Park Avenue. The surroundings are mostly commercial, continuing as a four-lane road and intersecting with CR 4 (Commack Road) at a fork. After Commack Road, NY 231 becomes a residential arterial with a grassy, divided median and intersecting with CR 57 (Bay Shore Road) in Deer Park. The highway continues northward through Deer Park, crossing through a large commercial strip and underneath the Long Island Rail Road's Ronkonkoma Branch. There is a short interchange with Long Island Avenue in Deer Park, from which point NY 231 continues north and into Dix Hills, where it once again becomes residential near the intersection with CR 2 (Straight Path).

The arterial road remains residential, continuing northward to an interchange with Interstate 495 (the Long Island Expressway) in Dix Hills. Here, the road widens to five lanes and crosses underneath the interstate, at which point NY 231 once again becomes four lanes. NY 231 then continues northward along the residential strip, intersecting with CR 67 (the Long Island Motor Parkway). The road then continues northwards, soon reaching a partial cloverleaf interchange with the Northern State Parkway, where the NY 231 designation terminates.

At its northern terminus, Deer Park Avenue forks into two Suffolk County-maintained routes; the western fork continues northwest as CR 35 (Deer Park Road, and later, Park Avenue), and the eastern fork continues northeast as CR 66 (East Deer Park Road).

== History ==
The entirety of Deer Park Avenue and Deer Park Road was originally designated as part of CR 35 by the County of Suffolk on February 24, 1930.

Governor Nelson Rockefeller announced in 1961 funding would be allocated for the reconstruction and widening of Deer Park Avenue. This project would help reduce congestion along the southern section of Deer Park Avenue during commutes and travel on weekends. The project would also help reduce flooding along Deer Park Avenue, which was a significant problem even during light rain. To relieve this issue, a system of drainage pipes would be constructed underneath the roadway.

In the 1960s, there were plans to upgrade the entirety of NY 231 to a limited-access expressway, leading to much of CR-35 being transferred to the State of New York. However, only a short segment of this route was ever upgraded to freeway standards.

=== Plans for the Babylon–Northport Expressway ===
A map showing the built (black) and unbuilt (red) segments of the Babylon-Northport Expressway.

As suggested by its name, the Babylon–Northport Expressway was originally intended to be a north–south expressway spanning most of the width of Long Island, between NY 27A in the Incorporated Village of Babylon at its southern end and the intersection of Elwood Road, Fort Salonga Road (NY 25A), and Reservoir Avenue at its northern end, in the Incorporated Village of Northport. Local opposition to the expressway, however, eventually resulted in the cancellation of the project before anything more than the existing 2-mile stretch could be constructed. Despite this, roughly 40 percent of the properties along the proposed expressway's right-of-way were acquired by New York State for the unbuilt extension – including several properties along Elwood Road (CR 10), in Elwood and Greenlawn. Exits would have been at North Hempstead Turnpike (now Fort Salonga Road, NY 25A) and Jericho Turnpike (NY 25), with a possible interchange at Pulaski Road (CR 11).

In 1962, the New York State Department of Public Works announced that Deer Park Avenue would be widened for a fourteen-mile stretch from Montauk Highway and NY 25A. The road would be expanded from a two-lane boulevard to a four-lane boulevard, at a cost of about $20 million (1962 USD) with a slated completion of 1970. The first section would have its contract let on May 3, 1962, with a cost of $2.4 million. This stretch would include the piece between the Southern State Parkway and Lake Avenue in Deer Park. The new piece of the right-of-way would be completed by the middle of 1965. The second section was to be started in the spring of 1963, which would be constructed along the 2-mile (3.2 km) section from the Montauk Highway to the Southern State Parkway, and also be completed by the middle of 1965.

In the 1960s, the portion of CR 35 between the Southern and Northern State Parkways was transferred to the state of New York, which designated the highway as NY 231. Initially, NY 231 followed Deer Park Avenue (now CR 34) south to NY 27A in Babylon; however, it was realigned c. 1969 to follow the 2-mile (3.2 km), limited-access section of the new Babylon–Northport Expressway.

Currently, the Babylon-Northport Expressway ends at an at grade intersection with Hunter Avenue, three-quarters of a mile north of Sunrise Highway.

== Hot Rod Mecca ==
For at least 30 years, Deer Park Avenue served as one of the nation's hottest cruising strips. The New York Times twice called the three-mile (4.8 km) stretch from North Babylon to Deer Park a "Mecca for young people" where crowds of teens and young adults, usually those below legal drinking age, from Long Island and Queens, would line parking lots, hoods up, chatting and showing off their rides.

On June 4, 2001, at 7:30 p.m., in part due to a second feature in The New York Times, the Joint Civic and Taxpayers Association met with elected town and New York State Department of Transportation officials for an action plan to crack-down on the drag-racing, littering and cruising calling it a significant quality of life issue for community residents.

== Major intersections ==
The entire route is in Suffolk County.

All exits are unnumbered.

| Location | mi | km | Destinations | Notes |
|---|---|---|---|---|
| Babylon–Islip town line | 0.00 | 0.00 | NY 27A (Montauk Highway) – Bay Shore, Babylon | Southern terminus; at-grade intersection; former NY 27 |
| Babylon–Islip town line | 0.59 | 0.95 | John Street (CR 50) – West Islip, Babylon | Southbound exit and northbound entrance |
| Babylon–Islip town line | 1.50 | 2.41 | NY 27 – New York, Montauk | Exit 40 on NY 27 |
| North Babylon | 2.59 | 4.17 | Southern State Parkway – New York, East Islip | Exits 39S-N on Southern State Parkway |
| North Babylon | 2.59 | 4.17 | Northern end of limited-access section | |
| Dix Hills | 7.24 | 11.65 | I-495 – New York, Riverhead | Exit 51 on I-495 |
| Dix Hills | 9.05 | 14.56 | Northern State Parkway – New York, Hauppauge | Exit 42S on Northern State Parkway |
| Dix Hills | 9.05 | 14.56 | CR 35 north / CR 66 north | Continuation north |
1.000 mi = 1.609 km; 1.000 km = 0.621 mi: Incomplete access
