= New York State Route 109 =

Highway on Long Island, New York

New York State Route 109
- Map of Long Island with NY 109 highlighted in red

Route information
- Maintained by NYSDOT
- Length: 7.08 mi (11.39 km)
- Existed: early 1930s–present

Major junctions
- West end: NY 24 in Farmingdale
- CR 28 / Southern State Parkway at the East Farmingdale–North Amityville line NY 27 at the North Lindenhurst–West Babylon line
- East end: NY 27A in Babylon

Location
- Country: United States
- State: New York
- Counties: Nassau, Suffolk

Highway system
- New York Highways; Interstate; US; State; Reference; Parkways
← NY 108	→ NY 110

New York State Route 109 (NY 109), also known as the Babylon–Farmingdale Turnpike and historically as Maywood–Babylon Road, is a four-lane state highway on Long Island, in New York, United States. It runs from the Village of Farmingdale in the Nassau County town of Oyster Bay to the Village of Babylon in Suffolk County. It runs mainly west-to-east in a northwest to southeast direction.

Unusually, the mileage count on the reference markers on NY 109 begins at the route's eastern terminus at NY 27A in Babylon and increases as the route heads west and north toward Farmingdale. This runs contrary to the New York State Department of Transportation's standard practice of inventorying an east-west route from west to east.

== Route description ==
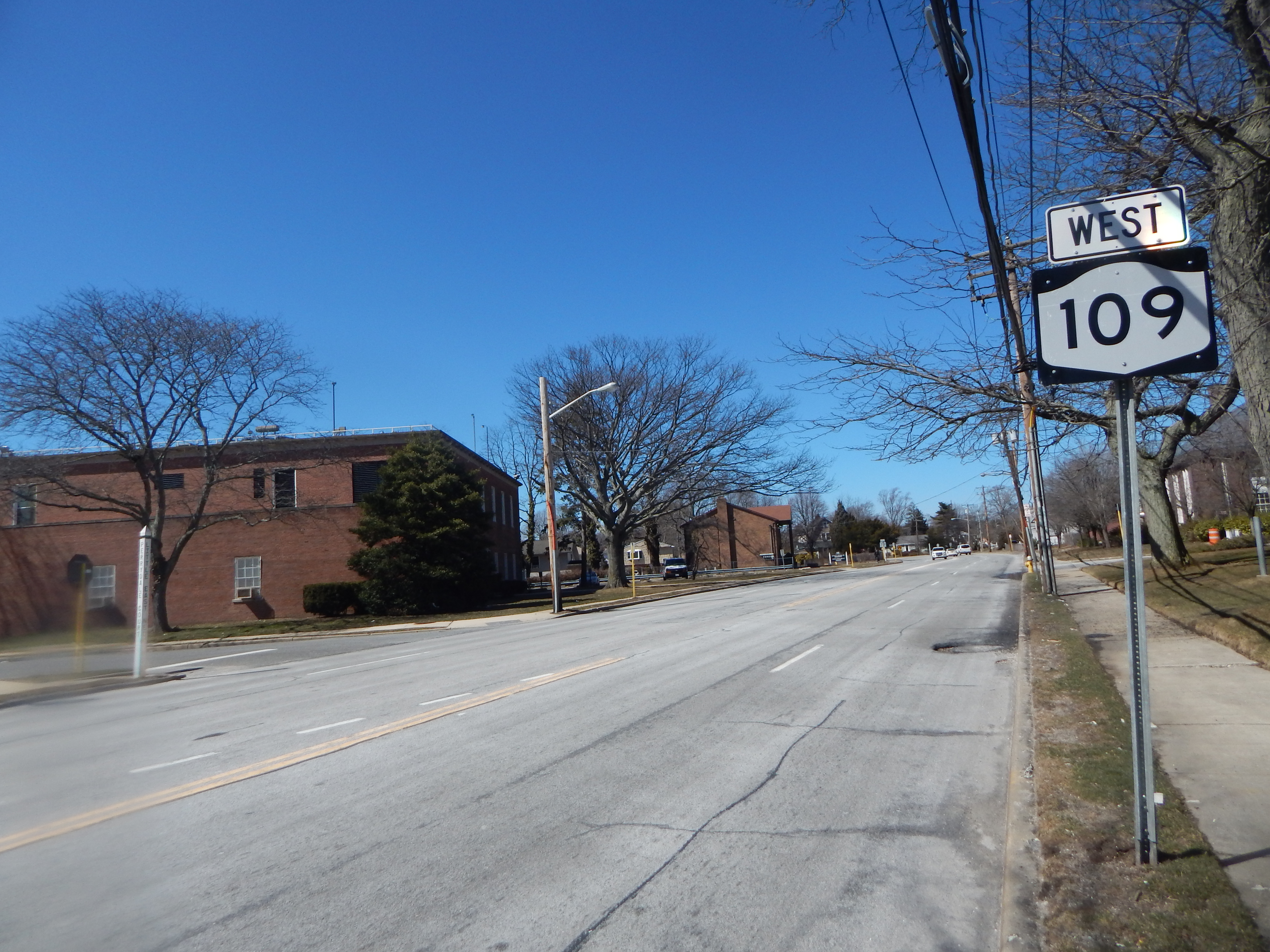
NY 109 running west from NY 27A in Babylon

NY 109 begins at a fork in the road from NY 24's western segment (Conklin Street) in the Nassau County village of Farmingdale. It proceeds eastward as Fulton Street in Farmingdale, a four-lane commercial arterial through the town, passing multiple apartment buildings. At Main Street, a median starts developing in the center, dividing NY 109 as it crosses through a residential section of Farmingdale. Soon crossing back into the town of Oyster Bay, the route parallels the Central Branch of the Long Island Rail Road as it heads through town. After crossing into another large commercial district, this time in the hamlet of East Farmingdale in the town of Babylon, Suffolk County, NY 109 enters a partial cloverleaf interchange with NY 110 (Broad Hollow Road).

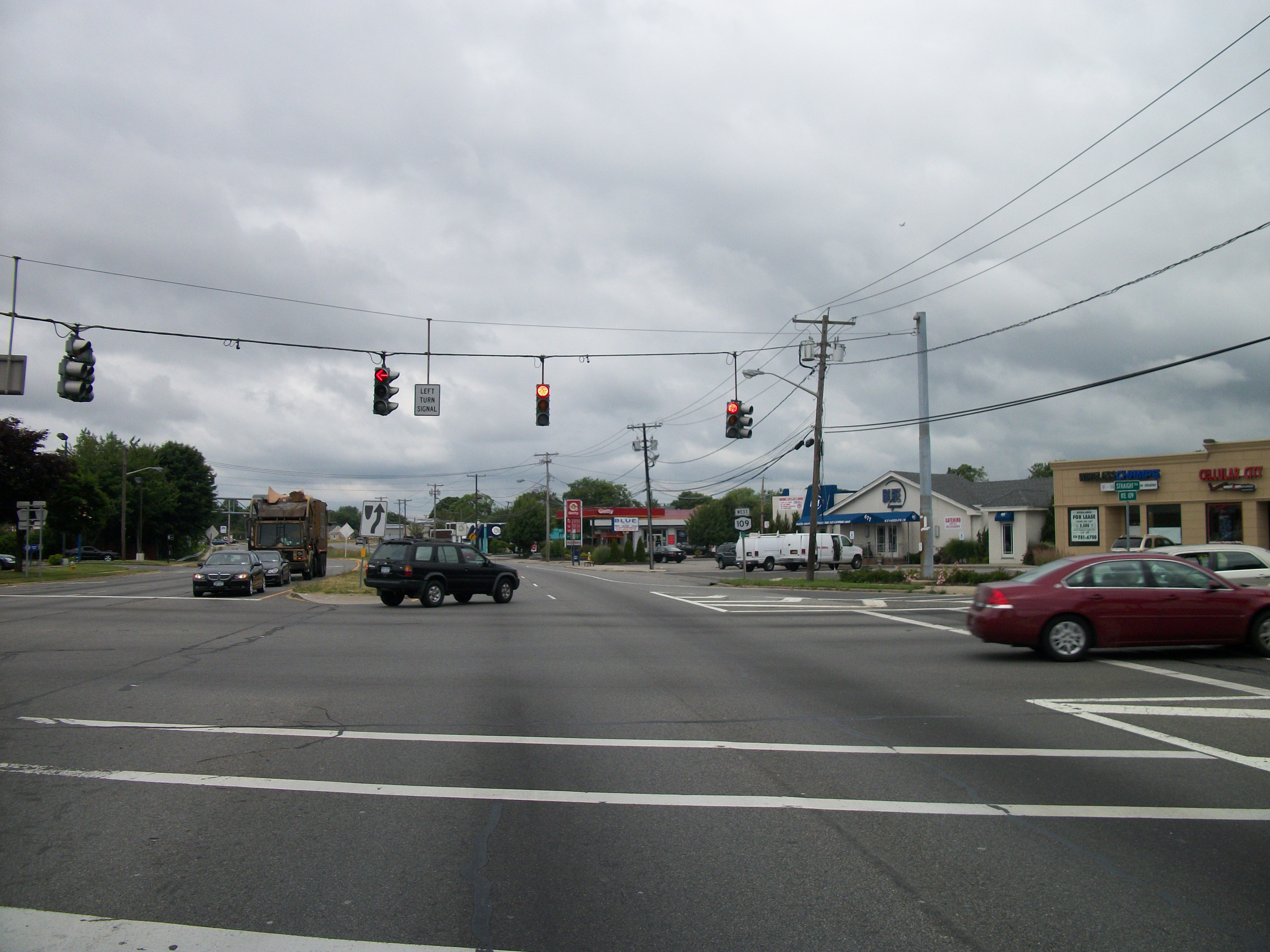
NY 109 westbound at the junction with CR 2 (Straight Path) in Babylon

Now known as Farmingdale Road, the route passes a jughandle for Republic Airport. NY 109 crosses into an interchange with the Southern State Parkway and the Corporal Tony Casamento Highway. NY 109 changes names to Babylon–Farmingdale Road, passing south of Mount Ararat Cemetery. The four-lane arterial crosses through a large industrial section of Babylon, entering an intersection with County Route 3 (CR 3; North Wellwood Avenue). Changing over to a commercial neighborhood of Babylon, NY 109 remains four lanes, crossing an intersection with CR 2 (Straight Path). A short distance later, NY 109 enters an interchange with NY 27 (the Sunrise Highway) right where the boulevard form converts over to a limited access freeway.

NY 109 continues east through Babylon, crossing between a commercial and residential neighborhood. Proceeding southeast, the route enters an intersection with Little East Neck Road North and CR 96 (Great East Neck Road). NY 109 changes names to Little East Neck Road North and turns southeast through Babylon. The four lane boulevard crosses into Argyle Park, crossing under the Long Island Rail Road Babylon Branch and into an intersection with CR 12 (South Railroad Avenue). NY 109 bends southward through Argyle Park, remaining four lanes into Deer Park, where it meets an intersection with NY 27A (West Main Street), the eastern terminus of NY 109.

== History ==
The NY 109 route designation was assigned to its current alignment in the early 1930s, and the designation has not been altered since. The highway has historically been known as Maywood–Babylon Road.

== Major intersections ==
County	Location	mi	km	Destinations	Notes
Nassau	Farmingdale	0.00	0.00	NY 24 (Conklin Street)	Western terminus
Suffolk	East Farmingdale	1.70	2.74	NY 110 – Amityville, Huntington	Cloverleaf interchange
Suffolk	East Farmingdale–North Amityville line	2.63	4.23	Southern State Parkway – New York, East Islip	No westbound access to Parkway east; exit 33 on Southern State Parkway
Suffolk	East Farmingdale–North Amityville– North Lindenhurst tripoint	2.82	4.54	CR 28 south (New Highway) / Southern State Parkway east – East Islip	Northern terminus of CR 28; exit 34 on Southern State Parkway
Suffolk	North Lindenhurst–West Babylon line	4.83	7.77	NY 27 – New York, Montauk	Exit 37 on NY 27
Suffolk	Village of Babylon	7.08	11.39	NY 27A (West Main Street)	Eastern terminus; former NY 27
1.000 mi = 1.609 km; 1.000 km = 0.621 mi: Incomplete access
