= East Hampton North, New York =

- Census-designated place
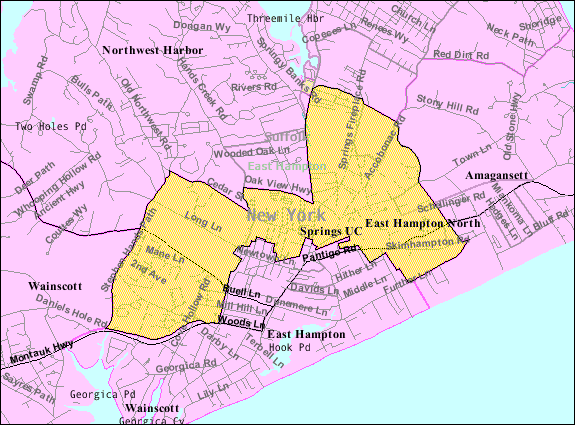

- Location within New York
- Coordinates: 40°58′16″N 72°11′20″W
- Country: United States
- State: New York
- County: Suffolk
- Town: East Hampton

Area
  - Total: 5.57 sq mi (14.43 km^{2})
  - Land: 5.57 sq mi (14.43 km^{2})
  - Water: 0 sq mi (0.00 km^{2})

Population (2020)
  - Total: 5,377
  - Density: 965.1/sq mi (372.61/km^{2})
- Time zone: UTC-5 (Eastern (EST))
  - Summer (DST): UTC-4 (EDT)
- FIPS code: 36-22200

East Hampton North is a census-designated place (CDP) in Suffolk County, New York, United States. As of the 2020 census, East Hampton North had a population of 5,377.

== Geography ==
East Hampton North is located at 40°58′16″N 72°11′20″W (40.971060, -72.188759).

According to the United States Census Bureau, the CDP has an area of 5.6 square miles (14.6 km^{2}), all land.

== Demographics ==
Historical population
Census	Pop.	Note	%±
2000	3,587		—
2010	4,142		15.5%
2020	5,377		29.8%
U.S. Decennial Census

=== Racial and ethnic composition ===
East Hampton North CDP, New York – Racial and ethnic composition Note: the US Census treats Hispanic/Latino as an ethnic category. This table excludes Latinos from the racial categories and assigns them to a separate category. Hispanics/Latinos may be of any race.
Race / Ethnicity (NH = Non-Hispanic)	Pop 2000	Pop 2010	Pop 2020	% 2000	% 2010	% 2020
White alone (NH)	2,575	2,179	2,524	71.79%	52.61%	46.94%
Black or African American alone (NH)	262	244	219	7.30%	5.89%	4.07%
Native American or Alaska Native alone (NH)	3	9	8	0.08%	0.22%	0.15%
Asian alone (NH)	58	44	75	1.62%	1.06%	1.39%
Native Hawaiian or Pacific Islander alone (NH)	3	0	0	0.08%	0.00%	0.00%
Other race alone (NH)	21	14	38	0.59%	0.34%	0.71%
Mixed race or Multiracial (NH)	69	58	117	1.92%	1.40%	2.18%
Hispanic or Latino (any race)	596	1,594	2,396	16.62%	38.48%	44.56%
Total	3,587	4,142	5,377	100.00%	100.00%	100.00%

=== 2020 census ===
As of the 2020 census, East Hampton North had a population of 5,377. The median age was 41.3 years. 21.6% of residents were under the age of 18 and 17.5% were 65 years of age or older. For every 100 females, there were 101.7 males, and for every 100 females age 18 and over, there were 99.1 males age 18 and over.

100.0% of residents lived in urban areas, while 0.0% lived in rural areas.

There were 1,889 households in East Hampton North, of which 34.9% had children under the age of 18 living in them. Of all households, 50.6% were married-couple households, 16.4% were households with a male householder and no spouse or partner present, and 27.3% were households with a female householder and no spouse or partner present. About 25.6% of all households were made up of individuals, and 13.4% had someone living alone who was 65 years of age or older.

There were 2,856 housing units, of which 33.9% were vacant. The homeowner vacancy rate was 3.5% and the rental vacancy rate was 10.9%.

=== 2000 census ===
As of the census of 2000, there were 3,587 people, 1,445 households, and 881 families residing in the CDP. The population density was 643.1/mi^{2} (248.2/km^{2}). There were 2,251 housing units at an average density of 403.6/mi^{2} (155.8/km^{2}). The racial makeup of the CDP was 82.46% White, 7.39% African American, 0.08 Native American, 1.62% Asian, 0.08% Pacific Islander, 5.94% from other races, and 2.43% from two or more races. Hispanic or Latino of any race were 16.62% of the population.

There were 1,445 households, out of which 27.3% had children under the age of 18 living with them, 44.2% were married couples living together, 12.2% had a female householder with no husband present, and 39.0% were non-families. 31.9% of all households were made up of individuals, and 16.8% had someone living alone who was 65 years of age or older. The average household size was 2.47 and the average family size was 3.07.

In the CDP, the population was spread out, with 22.3% under the age of 18, 6.7% from 18 to 24, 28.0% from 25 to 44, 25.8% from 45 to 64, and 17.2% who were 65 years of age or older. The median age was 41 years. For every 100 females, there were 92.6 males. For every 100 females age 18 and over, there were 90.2 males.

The median income for a household in the CDP was $45,347, and the median income for a family was $55,357. Males had a median income of $38,566 versus $29,750 for females. The per capita income for the CDP was $25,725. About 10.3% of families and 12.2% of the population were below the poverty line, including 20.5% of those under the age of 18 and 4.2% of those ages 65 or older.

== Schools ==
- East Hampton Union Free School District

== See also ==
- Freetown (East Hampton)
