= North Main Street Historic District (East Hampton, New York) =

Historic district in New York, United States

- U.S. National Register of Historic Places
- U.S. Historic district
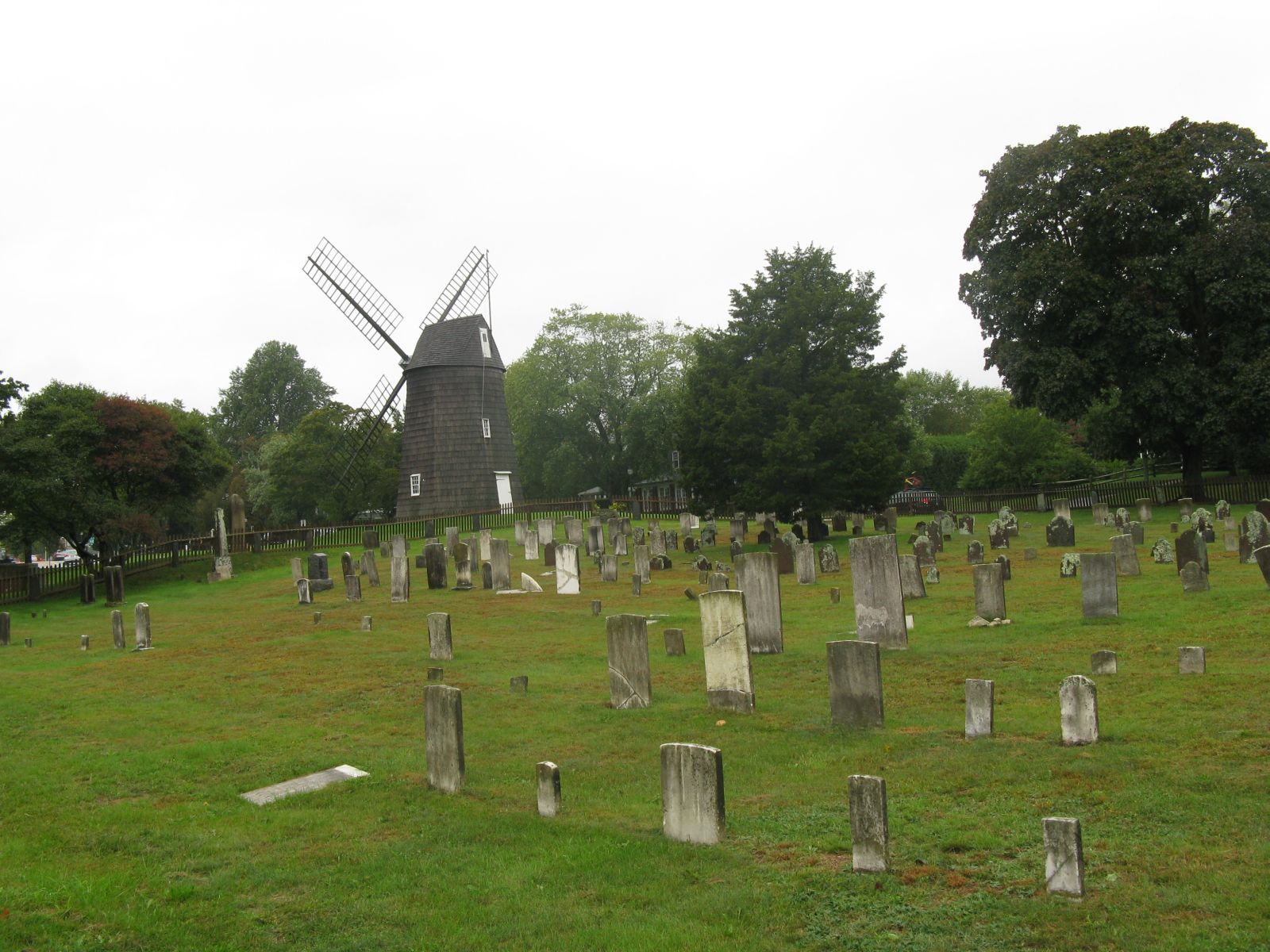
- North Burial Ground, September 2008

- Location within New York Location within the United States
- Location: N. Main St., East Hampton, New York
- Coordinates: 40°57′55″N 72°11′3″W
- Area: 15 acres (6.1 ha)
- Architectural style: Greek Revival, Late Victorian, Federal
- MPS: Village of East Hampton MRA
- NRHP reference No.: 88001025
- Added to NRHP: July 21, 1988

North Main Street Historic District is a national historic district located at East Hampton in Suffolk County, New York. The district includes 20 contributing buildings, two contributing structures, and two contributing sites. It includes 12 residential properties, one church, one cemetery, and one windmill.

It was added to the National Register of Historic Places in 1988.
