= Robinson-Parsons Farm =

Historic house in Maine, United States

- U.S. National Register of Historic Places
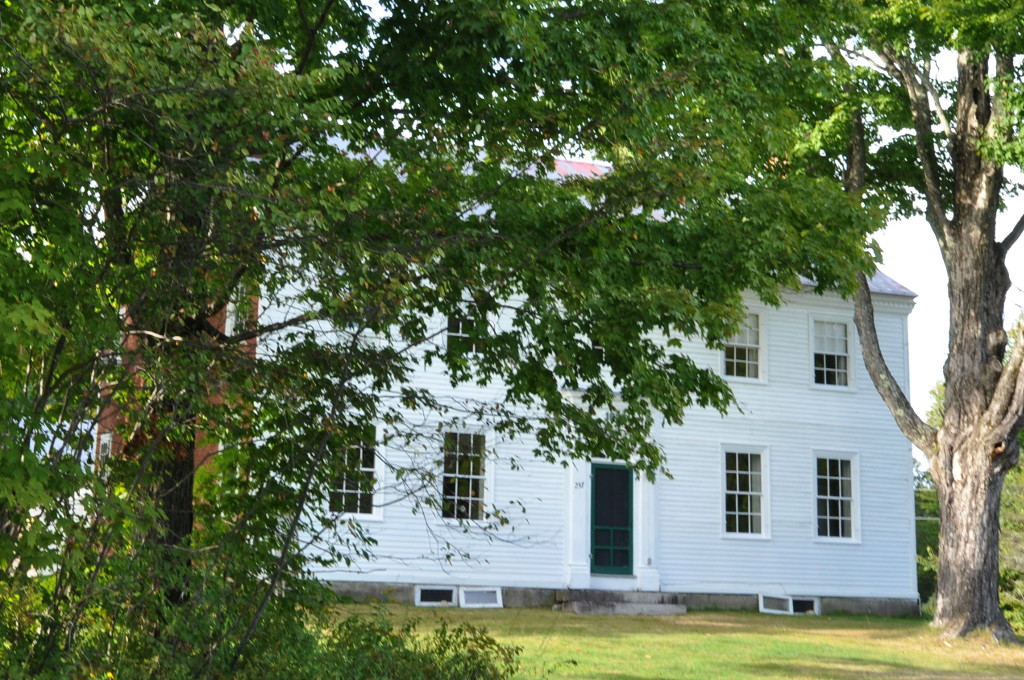

- Location within Maine Location within the United States
- Location: Parsons Rd., Paris, Maine
- Coordinates: 44°11′28″N 70°29′59″W
- Area: 1 acre (0.40 ha)
- Built: 1795
- Built by: Stephen Robinson
- Architectural style: Federal
- NRHP reference No.: 82000773
- Added to NRHP: February 4, 1982

The Robinson-Parsons Farm is a historic farmhouse on Parsons Road in Paris, Maine. This house, a well-preserved Federal style structure whose oldest portion dates to c. 1795, was built by Stephen Robinson, one of the earliest white settlers of the area, and has remained in the hands of his descendants. It is regionally distinctive for its brick side walls, a feature not normally found in rural Maine. It was listed on the National Register of Historic Places in 1982.

== Description and history ==
Stephen Robinson, one of the early white settlers of this part of Paris, acquired the land this house stands on in 1788. Around 1795 he built a two-story wood frame gable-roofed structure, which now serves as the rear ell of the main house. The birth of five daughters prompted the construction of the larger main block, which was completed in 1803. Robinson raised eleven children in the house, and one of his daughters married John Parsons of nearby Norway. This couple inherited the house, and it has since remained in the hands of their descendants.

The main block of the house is a 2 1/2-story wood-frame structure, five bays wide, with a side gable roof and four side chimneys in the brick end walls. The main entrance, centered on the east-facing facade, is topped by a fanlight window and flanked by pilasters of Doric order, which support a lintel with entablature. There are secondary entrances on the side walls. The rear ell joins the house to a barn. The upstairs of the main block features a distinctive hinged wall, enabling the space to be converted into a sizable ballroom for entertainment.

== See also ==
- National Register of Historic Places listings in Oxford County, Maine
