= Ponquogue Bridge =

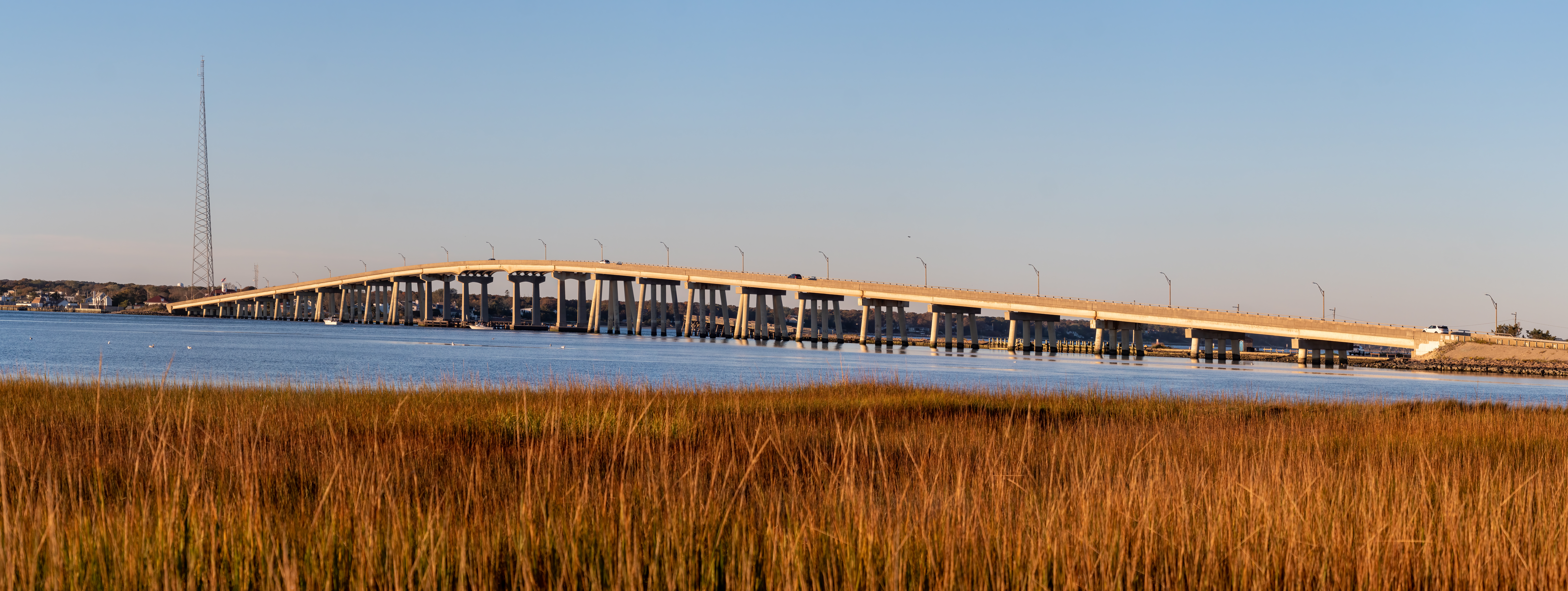
- The Ponquogue Bridge at sunset in 2022
- Coordinates: 40.8439°N 72.5011°W
- Carries: 2 lanes of County Route 32
- Crosses: Shinnecock Bay
- Locale: Hampton Bays, New York
- Maintained by: Suffolk County Department of Public Works
- ID number: 3300520

Characteristics
- Material: Concrete
- Total length: 2,812 feet (857 m)
- Width: 30 feet (9.1 m)
- No. of spans: 29
- Clearance above: 55 feet (17 m)

History
- Construction end: 1986
- Construction cost: $14 million (1986 USD)

Location
- Interactive map of Ponquogue Bridge

The Ponquogue Bridge is a 2,812-foot-long (857 m) bridge over Shinnecock Bay in Hampton Bays, New York. Maintained by the Department of Public Works for Suffolk County, the 29-span bridge carries two lanes of County Route 32 over the bay, connecting Hampton Bays to the eastern end of Westhampton Island. The bridge, which is made of concrete, has a 55-foot (17 m) vertical clearance above Shinnecock Bay. Constructed in 1986 at the cost of $14 million, the bridge replaced an older span over the bay, which was a 1,000-foot-long (300 m) wooden drawbridge built in 1930. The former Ponquogue Bridge currently serves as a fishing pier under the current span. However, the fishing pier was reconstructed numerous times and little remains of the original bridge.

== History ==
=== Bridge replacement ===
In 1976, the original Ponquogue Bridge had its weight limit on the structure reduced from 15 tons to 8 tons due to the neglect condition the bridge had attained. Timbers that sustained the bridge were rotting away, which was part of making the bridge harder to maintain. Discussions between Suffolk County and the United States Coast Guard made it hard to determine the exact location of a new bridge, which was discussed since 1973. In 1977, the county applied for a new bridge to be constructed 300 feet (91 m) from the original structure, costing $6 million (1976 USD) and designed as a bulb-shaped plan. The Coast Guard found that at least 3.5 acres (1.4 ha) of wetlands would be affected by this new structure and that any proposal for a building permit would be denied. By February 1980, the county resubmitted a proposal that would reduce it to 1.5 acres (0.61 ha) and also cost $14 million (1980 USD).

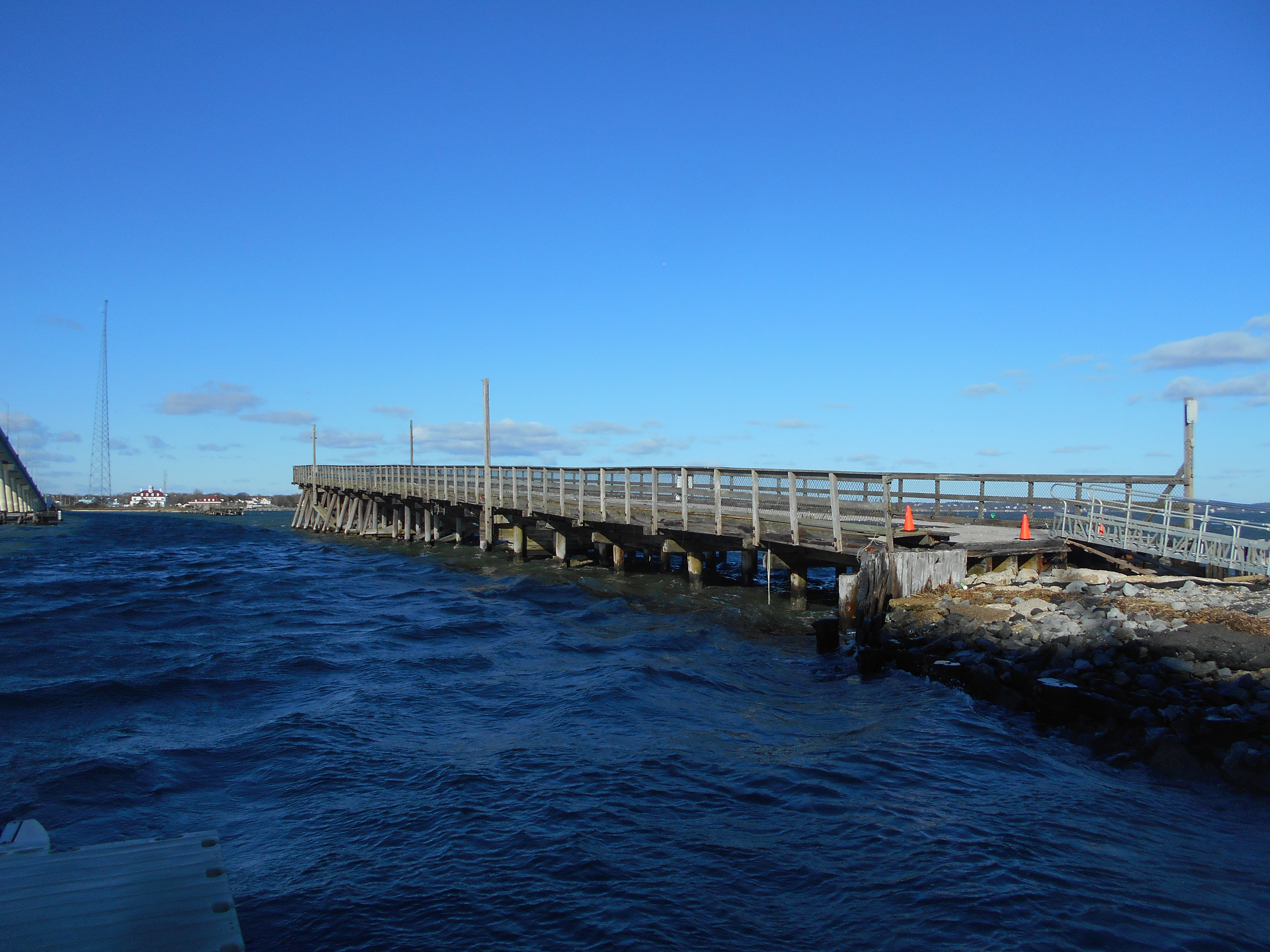
The former Ponquogue Bridge in November 2014, closed off from the old right-of-way

The Coast Guard called in an engineering firm from New Jersey to design alternatives to the county's proposal, which would attempt to prevent damage to the wetlands. The new structure called for would have approaches 800 feet (240 m) shorter and was eventually accepted by the town board for Southampton in 1980 on a 3–2 vote. This new span, which would be 55 feet (17 m) high, was deemed ridiculous by one local, who claimed that they should choose to only replace the drawbridge, which would cost about $2 million.

The Coast Guard approved a new proposal for a bridge 150 feet (46 m) away from the old decaying structure in 1982. Construction commenced throughout 1986 and opened in January 1987, at the same $14 million structure. However, during construction in 1985, a 145 feet (44 m), 90 ton girder that was being moved on a crane as part of bridge construction, fell loose and tumbled 30 feet (9.1 m) and was split in half upon contact with the barge. The $29,000 girder did not harm anyone working on the project. The old structure had its drawbridge span removed by Suffolk County, but left the former approaches in place. In the time since the bridge was constructed, the old one became a popular fishing pier and in 1997, were renovated for use. Two years later, Suffolk County deemed the approaches of the old bridge to be a "marine park".

On February 21, 2025, the Ponquogue Bridge was closed to all traffic. During a routine inspection, deteriorating concrete was found. Inspectors from the New York State Department of Transportation were back out on February 24 continuing to examine the bridge and obtain additional data to be analyzed by the engineers. On March 4, the bridge was reopened to vehicles weighing under five tons, as well as permitted ambulances by the Suffolk County DPW after emergency repairs were completed. A project is underway to fully rehabilitate the bridge, with construction anticipated to begin in 2026, and estimated completion in 2028.
