= Parsons–Piper–Lord–Roy Farm =

- U.S. National Register of Historic Places
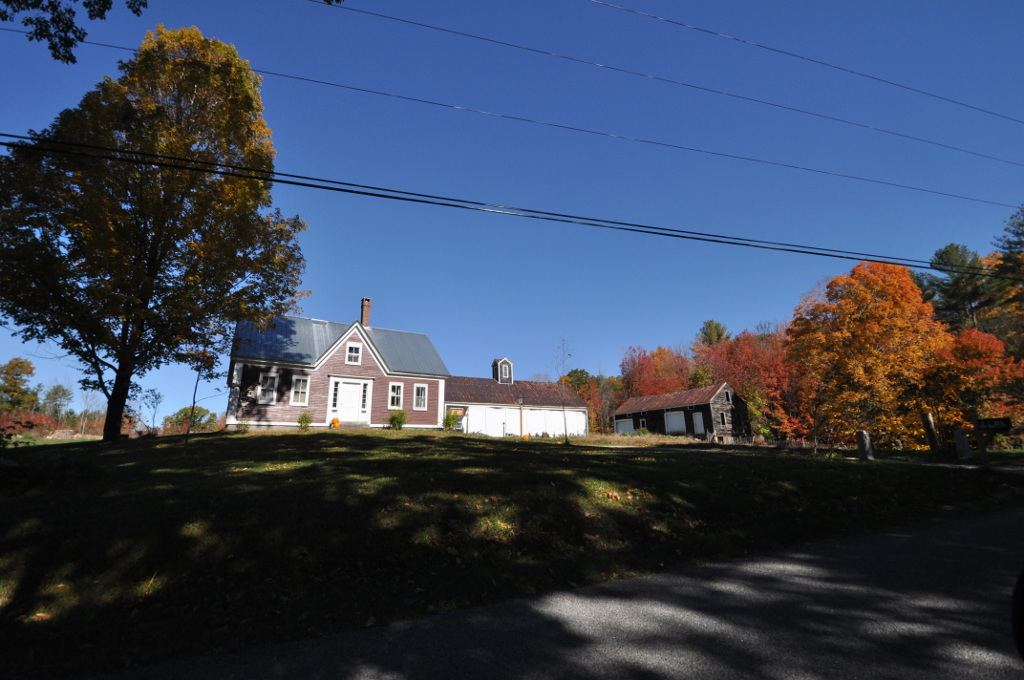

- Location within Maine Location within the United States
- Location: 309 Cramm Rd., Parsonsfield, Maine
- Coordinates: 43°42′30″N 70°50′49″W
- Area: 26 acres (11 ha)
- Built: 1844
- Architectural style: Greek Revival, Gothic Revival
- NRHP reference No.: 05000054
- Added to NRHP: February 15, 2005

The Parsons–Piper–Lord–Roy Farm is a historic farmstead at 309 Cramm Road in Parsonsfield, Maine. Its buildings dating to 1844, it is a fine example of a well-preserved mid-19th century farmstead, with modifications in the 20th century to adapt the barn to chicken farming. The property was listed on the National Register of Historic Places in 2005.

== Description and history ==
The Parsons–Piper–Lord–Roy Farm is a 26-acre (11 ha) rural agricultural property in southeastern Parsonsfield. The property consists of parcels of land on the north and south sides of Cramm Road, just east of its junction with Fenderson Road. Much of the property is wooded, some of that formerly agricultural land that has returned to forestation. The farmstead stands on the north side of Cramm Road, with three buildings arranged in a U shape around a central drive. The house, on the west side, is a 1-1/2 story Cape style wood frame structure, with a side gable roof and central front cross gable, with a 1-1/2 story ell extending to the rear to join to an attached carriage barn. The house has Greek Revival styling, its entrance flanked by sidelight windows and pilasters, and topped by an entablature with cornice.

At the top of the U stands the main barn, a large two-story bank barn with the gable oriented east-west. Its main entrance is on the west side, with a large sliding door topped by a two-tier transom window and a gabled Greek Revival entablature. Originally built to house large animals in stalls flanking a central drive, it has been converted into a chicken barn, with the loft space floored over for a usable third-floor space. The east side of the U has a rectangular structure now used as an equipment shed.

The buildings of the farmstead were built in 1844 by John Merrill, a local builder, for Enoch Parson (a descendant of Thomas Parson for whom the town is named) at the time of his daughter Hannah's marriage to Dan Piper. The Pipers and Parsons shared ownership of the entire farm property (which was originally about 1,000 acres (400 ha)). A later Parson descendant married into the Lord family, and were the last of that family line to own the property, which was sold in 1948 by their heirs to the Roy family. The Roys were responsible for the conversion of the farm to a chicken-raising operation.

== See also ==
- National Register of Historic Places listings in York County, Maine
