= Heckscher Park (Huntington, New York) =

- U.S. National Register of Historic Places
- U.S. Historic district
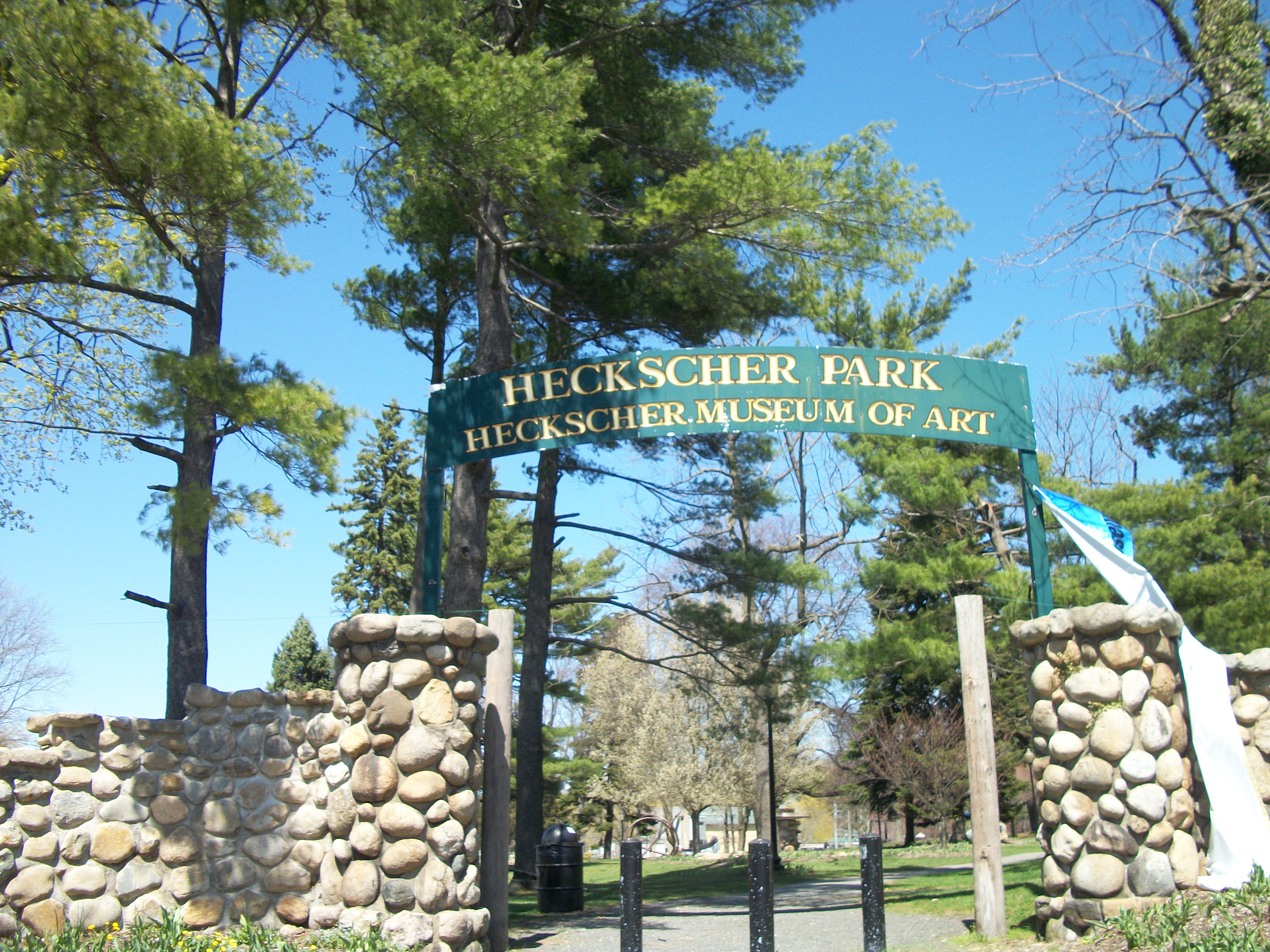
- Gateway to Heckscher Park. Heckscher Museum of Art is off to the left of this picture.

- Location within New York Location within the United States
- Location: Bounded by Madison St., Sabbath Day Path, Main St. & Prime Ave., Huntington, New York
- Coordinates: 40°52′29.2″N 73°25′14.8″W
- Area: 18.5 acres (7.5 ha)
- Architectural style: Late 19th And 20th Century Revivals, Second Renaissance Revival
- MPS: Huntington Town MRA
- NRHP reference No.: 85002532
- Added to NRHP: September 26, 1985

Heckscher Park is a local park and national historic district in Huntington, Suffolk County, New York. It is bounded by Madison Street, Sabbath Day Path, Main Street, and Prime Avenue. The park is roughly triangular-shaped with a large pond on northwest corner, and contains the Heckscher Museum of Art established by industrialist August Heckscher, as well as the Chapin Rainbow Theater. It hosts annual art festivals, tulip festivals, concerts, renaissance fairs, and the Huntington Summer Arts Festival. Heckscher Park was listed on the National Register of Historic Places in 1985.

== Image gallery ==
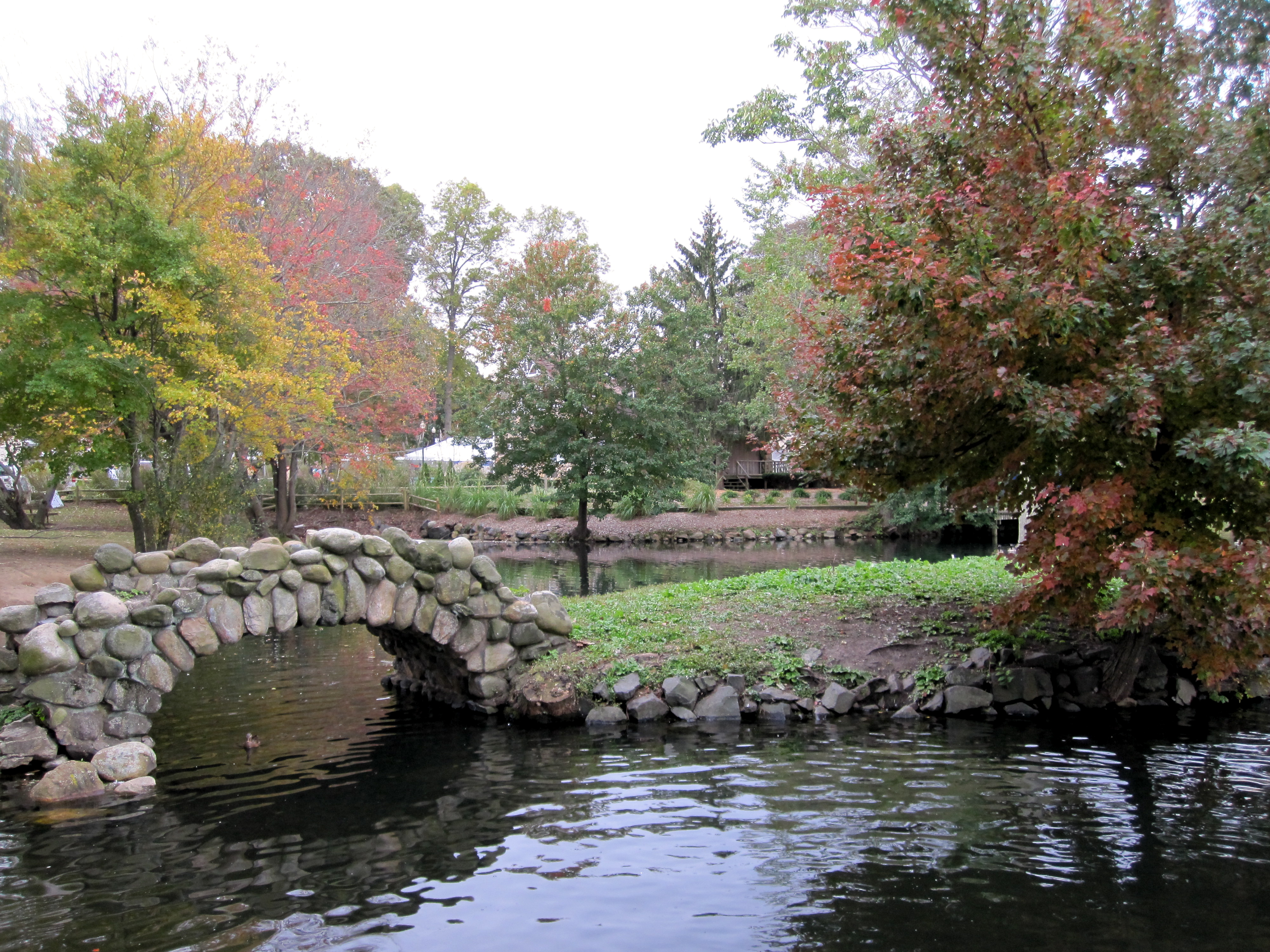
Stone bridge for one of the islands in the pond.

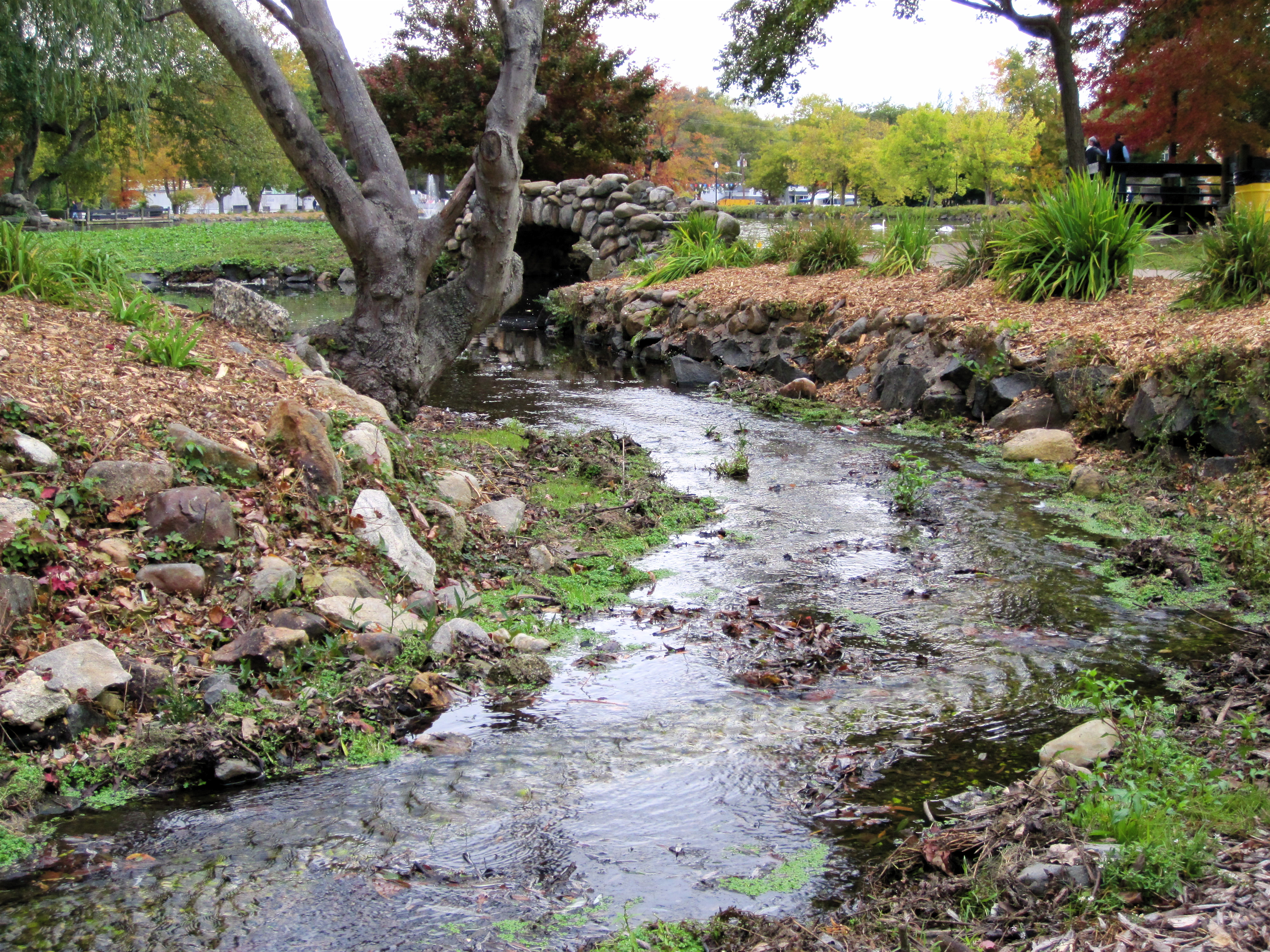
A creek within the park.
