= Samuel Parsons House =

Historic house in Connecticut, United States

- U.S. National Register of Historic Places
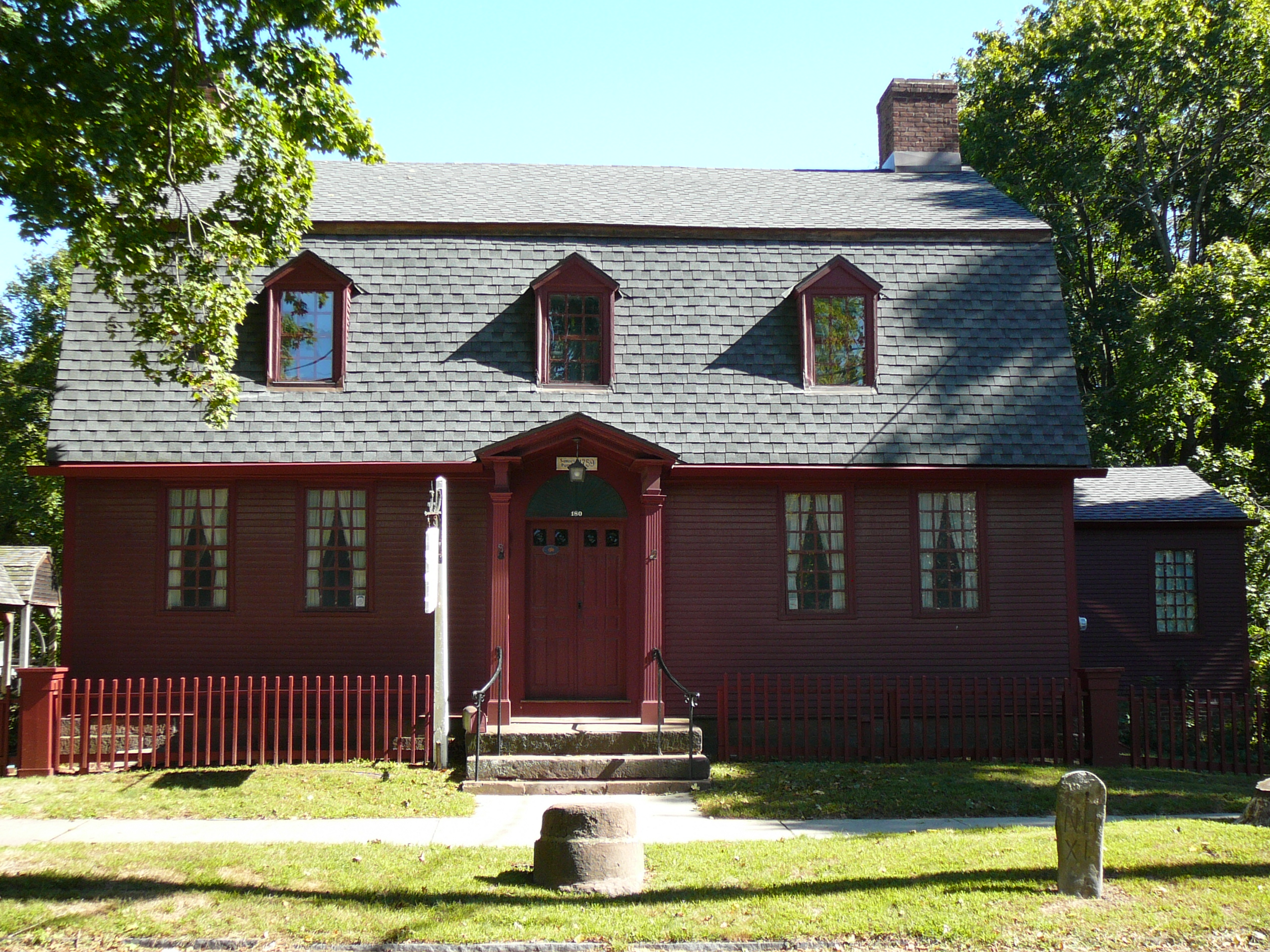

- Location within Connecticut Location within the United States
- Location: 180 South Main Street, Wallingford, Connecticut
- Coordinates: 41°27′04″N 72°49′14″W
- Area: 0.5 acres (0.20 ha)
- Built: c. 1770
- Architectural style: Georgian
- NRHP reference No.: 82004358
- Added to NRHP: April 12, 1982

The Samuel Parsons House is a historic house museum at 180 South Main Street in Wallingford, Connecticut. Built about 1770, it is a well-preserved example of Georgian residential architecture. It has housed the local historical society since 1919. It was listed on the National Register of Historic Places in 1982.

== Description and history ==
The Samuel Parsons House is located in a residential area south of downtown Wallingford, on the east side of South Main Street. It is a 2 1/2-story wood-frame structure, with a gambrel roof, end chimneys, and a clapboarded exterior. The first floor facade is five bays wide, with sash windows arranged symmetrically around the center entrance. The entrance is sheltered by a 19th-century gabled porch with square columns. Three gabled dormers pierce the steep front face of the roof. The interior has original finishes in most of its downstairs rooms, and its upper level has been opened up to create a museum gallery.

The house has an uncertain construction history, and is currently believed to have been built about 1770, based on stylistic evidence. Uncertain documentary evidence suggests it may have been built as early as 1759, but this assumes that the documents refer to the same building. The house was probably built by John Parsons, and is named for his grandson Samuel, who owned it by 1803. By the turn of the 20th century, a wing had been added to one side, and the building had been converted into a two-family residence. It was given to the Wallingford Historic Society in 1919, which adapted it for its use as a headquarters and museum.

== See also ==
- National Register of Historic Places listings in New Haven County, Connecticut
