= Tuckahoe, Suffolk County, New York =

- Hamlet and census-designated place
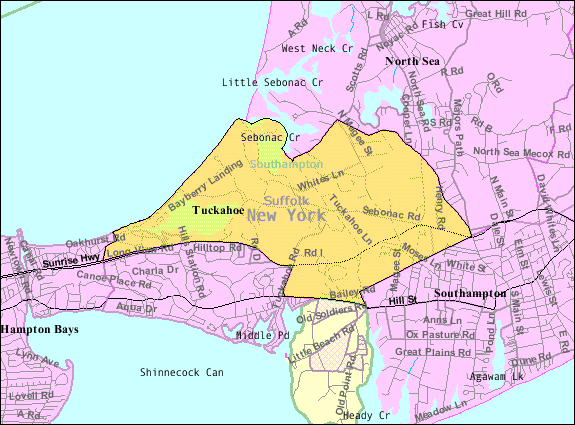
- U.S. Census map

- Location within New York
- Coordinates: 40°54′01″N 72°26′09″W
- Country: United States
- State: New York
- County: Suffolk

Area
  - Total: 4.74 sq mi (12.27 km^{2})
  - Land: 4.07 sq mi (10.55 km^{2})
  - Water: 0.66 sq mi (1.72 km^{2})
- Elevation: 49 ft (15 m)

Population (2020)
  - Total: 1,505
  - Density: 369.4/sq mi (142.64/km^{2})
- Time zone: UTC-5 (Eastern (EST))
  - Summer (DST): UTC-4 (EDT)
- ZIP code: 11968
- FIPS code: 36-75572
- GNIS feature ID: 0967923

Tuckahoe is a hamlet and census-designated place (CDP) in the Town of Southampton, Suffolk County, New York, United States. The population was 1,373 at the 2010 census.

== Geography ==
Tuckahoe is located at 40°54′01″N 72°26′09″W.

According to the United States Census Bureau, the CDP has a total area of 4.6 square miles (11.9 km^{2}), of which 4.1 square miles (10.7 km^{2}) is land and 0.46 square miles (1.2 km^{2}), or 9.97%, is water.

Tuckahoe is the home of three historic golf courses; Sebonack Golf Club, part of the Shinnecock Hills Golf Club, and National Golf Links of America.

Historical population
Census	Pop.	Note	%±
2020	1,505		—
U.S. Decennial Census

== Demographics ==
As of the census of 2000, there were 1,741 people, 687 households, and 456 families residing in the CDP. The population density was 343.9 inhabitants per square mile (132.8/km^{2}). There were 1,092 housing units at an average density of 215.7 per square mile (83.3/km^{2}). The racial makeup of the CDP was 84.26% White, 7.29% African American, 0.69% Native American, 0.75% Asian, 0.06% Pacific Islander, 5.28% from other races, and 1.67% from two or more races. Hispanic or Latino of any race were 18.44% of the population.

There were 687 households, out of which 29.1% had children under the age of 18 living with them, 52.1% were married couples living together, 9.3% had a female householder with no husband present, and 33.6% were non-families. 27.2% of all households were made up of individuals, and 10.0% had someone living alone who was 65 years of age or older. The average household size was 2.51 and the average family size was 2.95.

In the CDP, the population was spread out, with 21.9% under the age of 18, 7.4% from 18 to 24, 31.5% from 25 to 44, 23.7% from 45 to 64, and 15.6% who were 65 years of age or older. The median age was 39 years. For every 100 females, there were 98.5 males. For every 100 females age 18 and over, there were 102.4 males.

The median income for a household in the CDP was $55,885, and the median income for a family was $59,706. Males had a median income of $35,417 versus $27,788 for females. The per capita income for the CDP was $32,834. About 3.2% of families and 8.6% of the population were below the poverty line, including 9.0% of those under age 18 and 1.3% of those age 65 or over.
