= Zahn's Airport =

Private airfield in New York

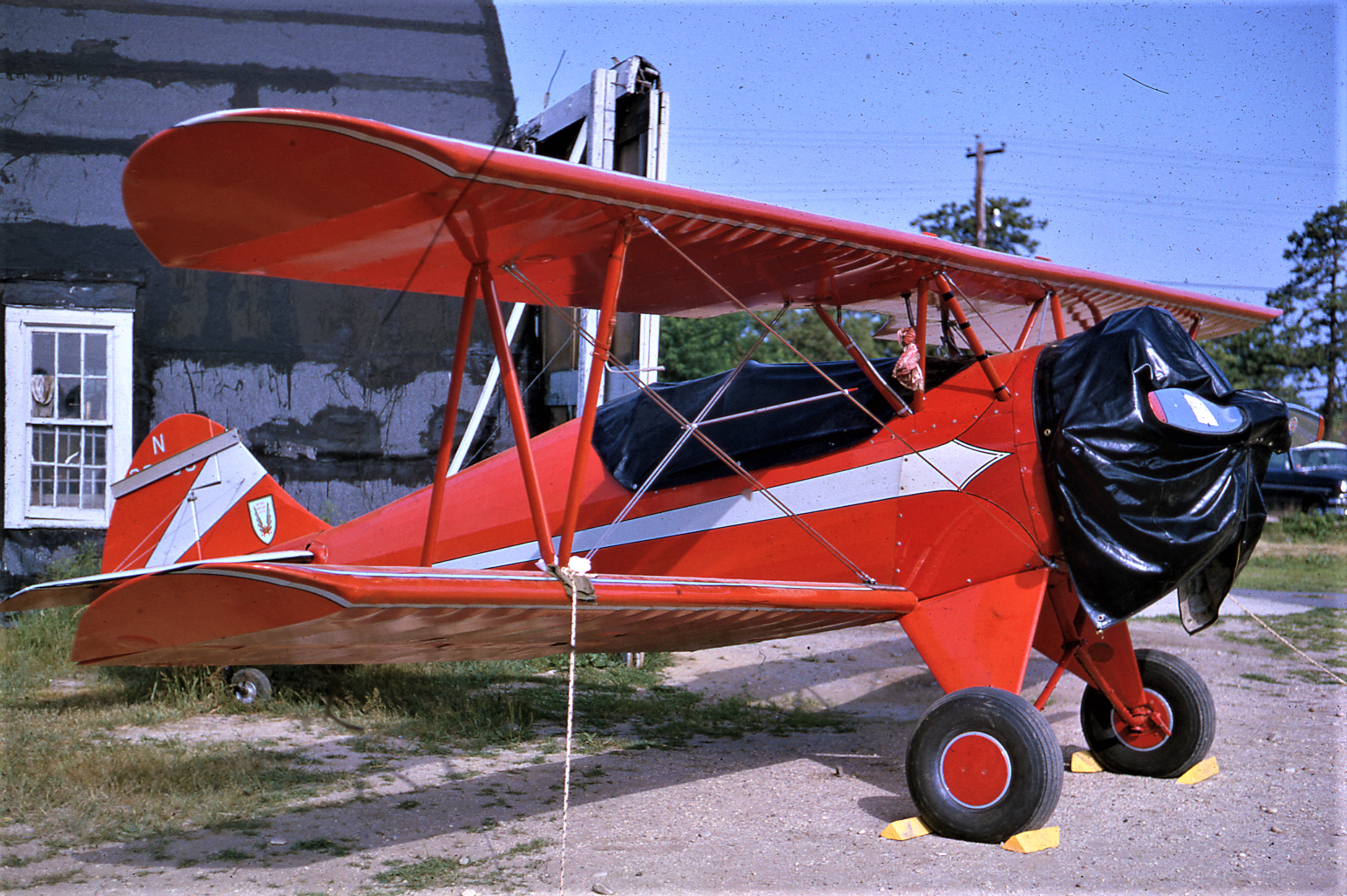
- A small bi-plane at Zahn's Airport in June 1964.
- IATA: AYZ; ICAO: none

Summary
- Location: North Amityville, New York
- Opened: 1936
- Closed: 1980
- Occupants: Private users, New York Army National Guard, Civil Air Patrol
- Coordinates: 40°42′45.05″N 73°23′51.28″W
- Interactive map of Zahn's Airport

Zahn's Airport was a private airfield in North Amityville on Long Island, New York. It operated from 1936 to 1980, eventually becoming one of the busiest general aviation airfields in the United States.

== History ==
The first airfield was created at the site north of Amityville by farmer Joseph Zahn, who cut a 1,000 feet (300 m) dirt strip from his apple orchard. He returned the land to agriculture during World War II, but reopened the airfield after the war.

One of the largest post-war tenants was the Amityville Flying School (AFS), which was created to train pilots on the G.I. Bill. AFS was founded by aircraft mechanic Jack Looney, operations manager Walter Hoffman, and pilot Ed Lyons. Lyons (a New Yorker born Edwin Leibowitz) had flown for the Republicans during the Spanish Civil War and in 1939 had helped to establish the Palestine Flying Service in Mandatory Palestine; the PFS became a precursor of the Israeli Air Force. In 1950 Joe Zahn sold the airfield to AFS, which continued to improve it through that decade. When Roosevelt Field closed in 1951, Zahn's became the busiest general aviation airfield in the State of New York.

For a time it was the largest privately owned airport in the United States. During the 1950s it was the home of the New York Yankees' private Douglas DC-3, a Grumman G-73 Mallard owned by the New York Daily News, and dozens of privately owned light aircraft. It featured two paved runways, with the longer one (in a north–south orientation) being 4,400 feet (1,300 m) long.

The aviation section of the 42nd Infantry Division (part of the New York Army National Guard) was based at Zahn's Airfield from 1951 (moving from Roosevelt Field) until 1963. It also hosted a detachment of the Civil Air Patrol; from 1961 to 1970 Ed Lyons was Colonel commanding the CAP's Northeast Region.

As its popularity increased through the 1960s, the condition of the airfield deteriorated. When Republic Aviation allowed other aircraft to use their factory airfield (Republic Airport, half a mile north of Zahn's) in the late 1960s, much of Zahn's traffic moved there.

Scenes for the 1957 James Stewart movie The Spirit of St. Louis were filmed at Zahn's, taking the place of Roosevelt Field.
