= Hall Place Estate =

Housing estate in Maida Vale, London

Coordinates: 51°31′24.22″N 0°10′32.77″W

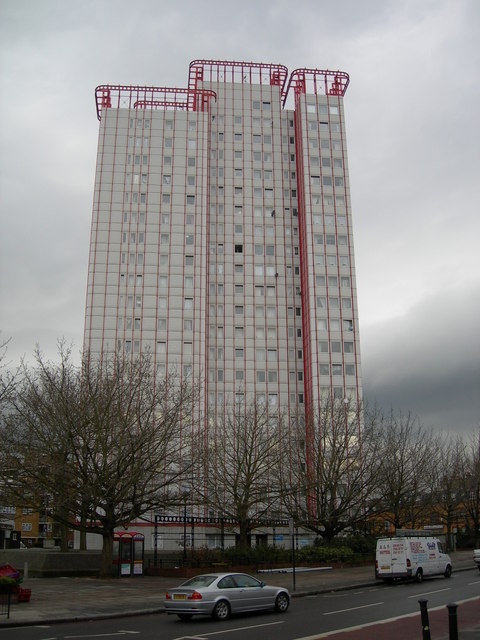
- Parsons House
- Interactive map of Hall Place Estate

General information
- Location: Maida Vale, London

Construction
- Constructed: 1960s

Other information
- Governing body: City of Westminster
- Famous residents: Steve Walsh

The Hall Place Estate is a housing estate in Maida Vale in the City of Westminster. The estate is immediately west of the Edgware Road.

The estate includes the Parsons House skyscraper which has distinctive red and white vertical external cladding. Parsons House was built in 1969 with a concrete panel system. The tower was refurbished in 1984 including the installation of powder coated aluminium panel cladding. There are 120 flats on 20 floors.

The other blocks in the estate are low rise.

The Radio London Disc Jockey Steve Walsh was living in Parsons House at the time of his death on 1988.
