= Ambrose Parsons House =

Historic house in New York, United States

- U.S. National Register of Historic Places
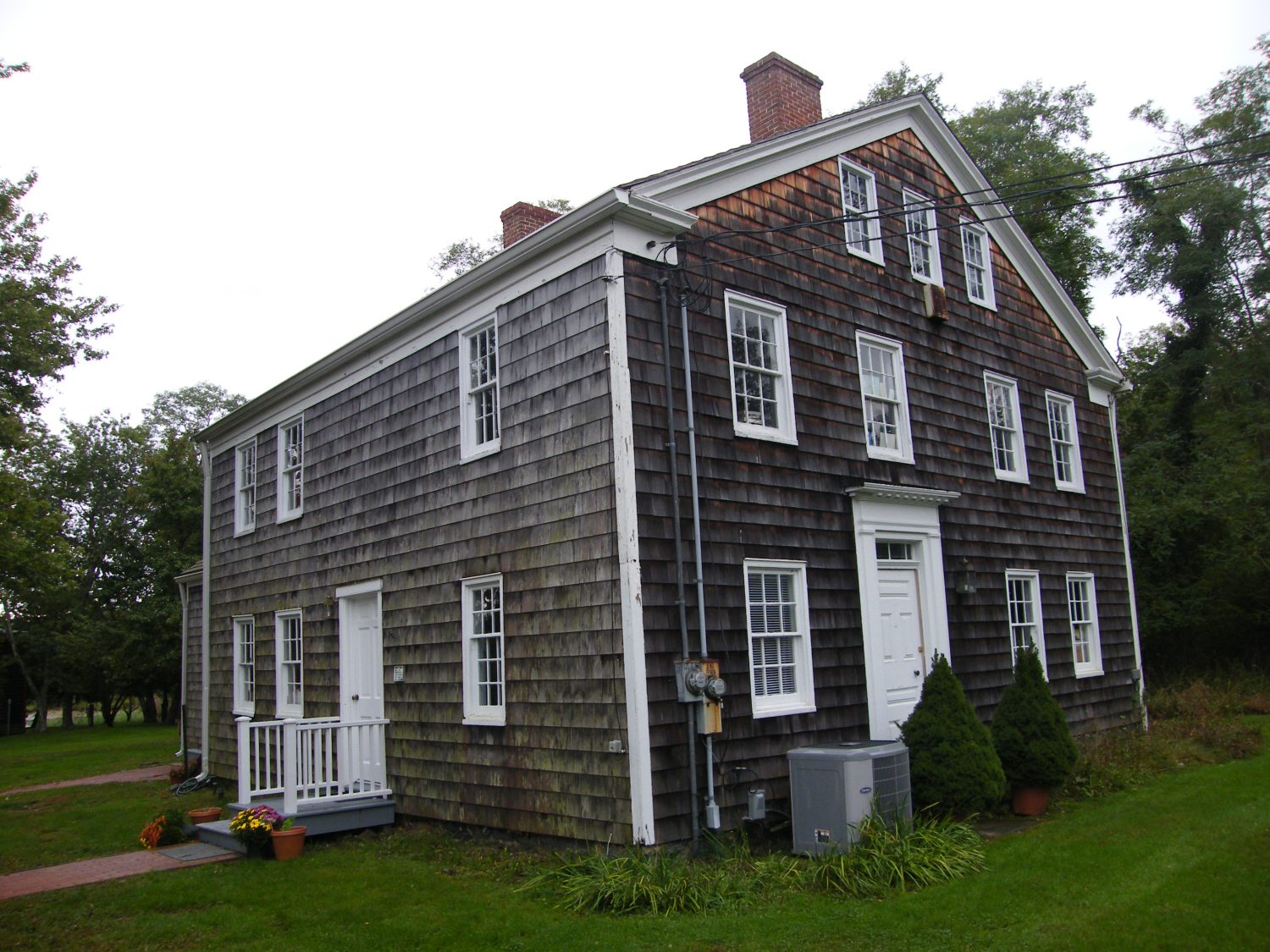
- Parsons House, October 2008

- Location within New York Location within the United States
- Location: Springs-Fireplace Rd. at jct. with Old Stone Hwy., Town of East Hampton, Springs, New York
- Coordinates: 41°1′14″N 72°9′26″W
- Area: 2 acres (0.81 ha)
- Built: 1842
- Architect: Parsons, Ambrose
- Architectural style: Greek Revival
- NRHP reference No.: 95001276
- Added to NRHP: November 7, 1995

Ambrose Parsons House is a historic home located at Springs in Suffolk County, New York. It was built in 1842 and 1851, and is a frame Greek Revival style residence. It is a two-story structure with a random ashlar, granite foundation. It has a square plan (31 ft (9.4 m) by 31 ft (9.4 m)), cedar shingle siding with corner boards, cedar wood shingle roofing, a one-story kitchen wing, and two principal elevations. The house is next door to the Charles Parsons Blacksmith Building.

It was added to the National Register of Historic Places in 1996. Though the NRHP lists the site as being at Springs-Fireplace Road at the Junction with Old Stone Highway, it is actually at the corner of Springs-Fireplace Road and Parson's Place, which is near the address given by NRHP.
