= James Benjamin Homestead =

Historic house in New York, United States

- U.S. National Register of Historic Places
- New York State Register of Historic Places
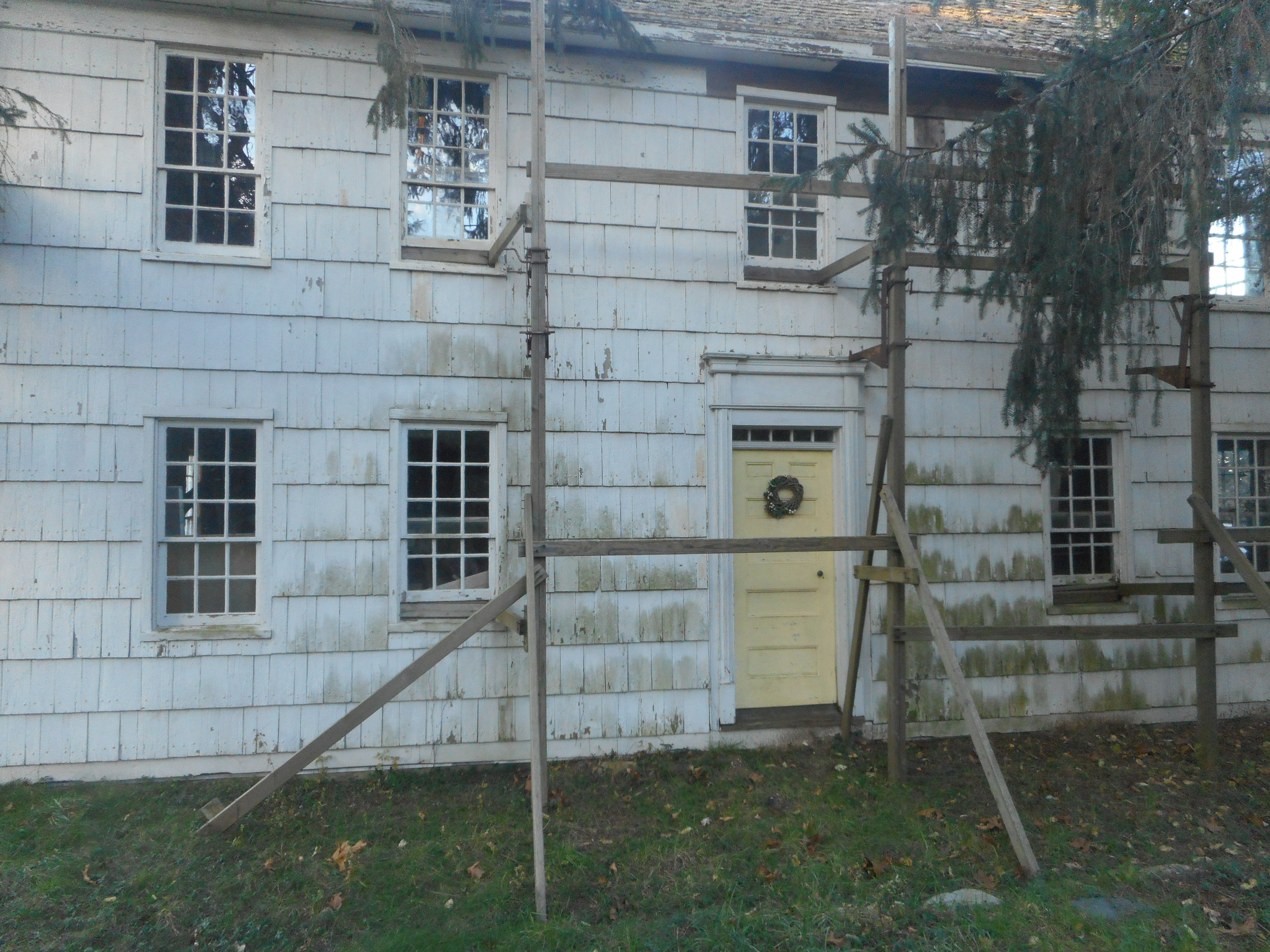
- The James Benjamin Homestead, with scaffolding along the front of the house

- Location within New York Location within the United States
- Location: 1182 Flanders Rd., Flanders, New York
- Coordinates: 40°54′11″N 72°37′4″W
- Area: 1 acre (0.40 ha)
- Built: 1785
- NRHP reference No.: 86001510

Significant dates
- Added to NRHP: August 13, 1986
- Designated NYSRHP: June 24, 1984

The James Benjamin Homestead is a historic home located at Flanders in Suffolk County, Long Island, New York, United States.

== Description ==
It consists of a main section, built about 1785, which is a two-story, center-entrance residence, and one- and two-story rear additions, built about 1900. Also on the property is a small, late 19th-century barn.

The house is hidden behind trees along New York State Route 24 and is a waterfront property along Reeves Bay, a segment of Flanders Bay, which is located between the Peconic River and the Great Peconic Bay.

It was added to the National Register of Historic Places in 1986.

== See also ==
- Big Duck
- Big Duck Ranch
