= Manuel Becerra =

Manuel Becerra may refer to:

== People ==
- Manuel Becerra (settler) (1762–c. 1849), Tejano settler and politician
- Manuel Becerra Bermúdez (1820–1896), Spanish politician
- Manuel Becerra Fernández (1867–1940), Spanish politician who served as Minister of Justice during the Second Spanish Republic
- Manuel Becerra Salazar (born 1983), Mexican poet

== Places ==
- Manuel Becerra (Madrid Metro), Madrid Metro Station
