= 50 West Street =

Skyscraper in Manhattan, New York

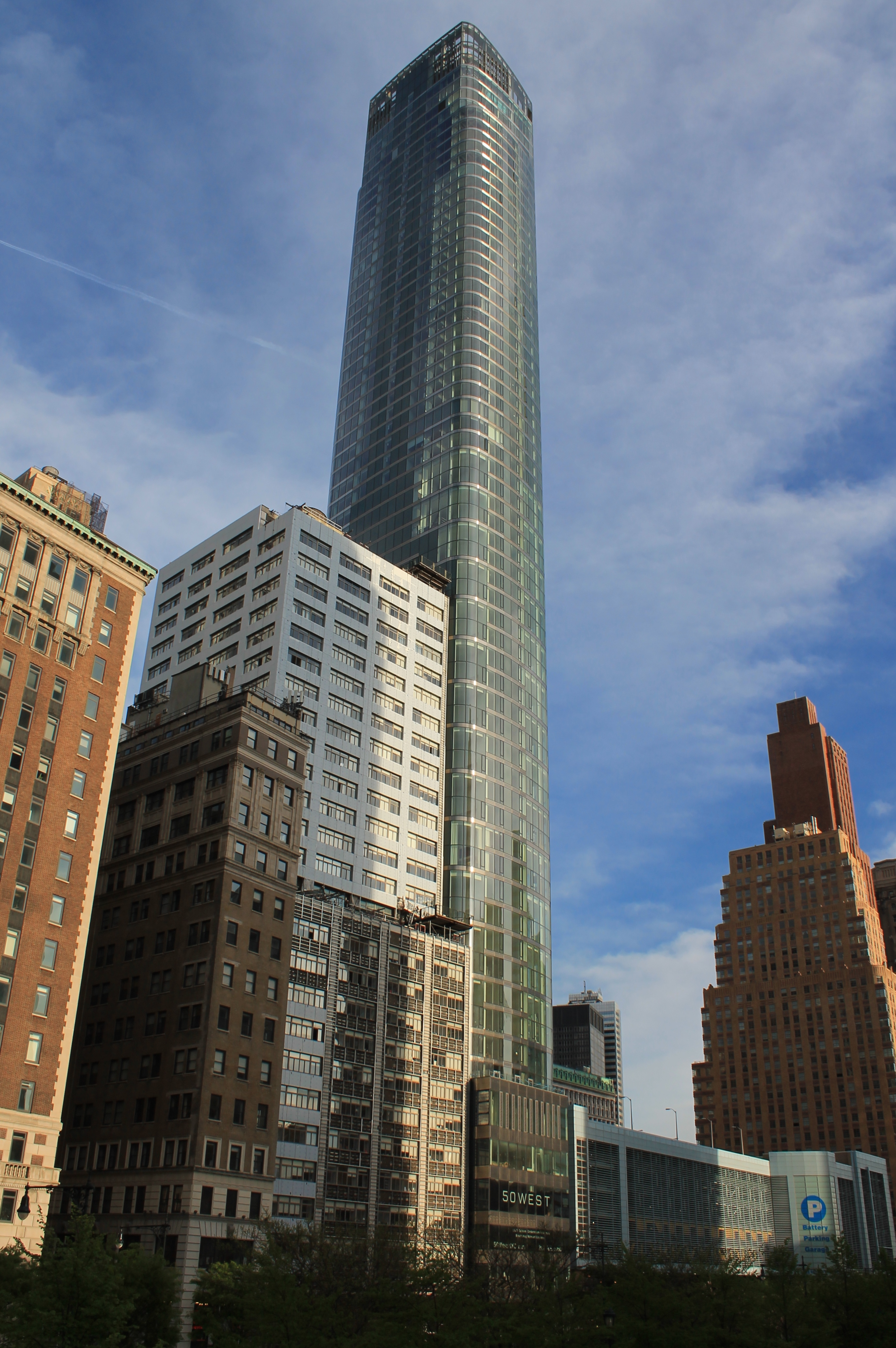
- Seen from the Rector Street pedestrian bridge across West Street in April 2017.
- Interactive map of the 50 West Street area

General information
- Status: Completed
- Type: Residential; Retail
- Location: 50 West Street
- Coordinates: 40.70801°N 74.01505°W
- Groundbreaking: June 23, 2008
- Construction started: Fall 2008
- Topped-out: October 23, 2016
- Completed: 2018
- Cost: $600 million

Height
- Architectural: 778 ft (237 m)
- Tip: 778 ft (237 m)
- Observatory: 734 ft (224 m)

Technical details
- Floor count: 65
- Floor area: 53,883 m^{2} (580,000 sq ft)

Design and construction
- Architect: Murphy/Jahn Architects
- Developer: Time Equities Inc.
- Structural engineer: DeSimone Consulting Engineers
- Main contractor: Hunter Roberts Construction Group

50 West Street is a 64-story, 778 ft (237 m) tall mixed-use retail and residential condominium tower developed by Time Equities Inc. in Lower Manhattan, New York City. It contains 191 residential units.

== Site ==
The building is located on 50 West Street, in the Financial District neighborhood of Lower Manhattan in New York City. The site borders a high-rise rental building called 90 Washington to the north while being surrounded by a privately owned parking garage to the south and east of the structure.

== Architecture ==
The building is designed by architect Helmut Jahn, known for works such as the Messeturm in Frankfurt, CitySpire, the Park Avenue Tower and 425 Lexington Avenue in New York City. The tower of curved glass is supposed to provide panoramic views of New York Harbor. In order to achieve a possible Gold LEED rating, the building includes sustainable technologies, such as a green roof, water-efficient plumbing fixtures, automated blinds and energy control systems.

A total of 3,000 panels of glass were to be installed, with each pane weighing up to 1,900 pounds (860 kg), framed by aluminum, and braced by stainless steel panels that are made in Italy. Five hundred of them are curved, and can cost 300 to 500 percent more than flat glass. According to Jahn, no other building uses curved glass in such volume, from street level to penthouse level.

50 West has been compared with nearby 17 State Street, highly appreciated by its "beautiful curved and reflective glass facade", with one author writing that it is a "complementary form and a updated take". Whereas 17 State's facade finishes with a more traditional top, 50 West's curves run in a single vertical gesture right to the edge of the parapet at the top, stopping only for a minor setback near the pinnacle.

The base of the building is bowed outwards in a curved cantilever, adding a further sensation of verticality, with a view to open up space for the Ward's Walk between the building and the Battery Garage immediately to the south.

Within each condominium at 50 West Street, interior designer Thomas Juul-Hansen has crafted interiors with spacious layouts.

== Construction ==
Developer Time Equities purchased the former office building at 50 West Street in 1983. On June 7, 2007, the skyscraper designs were presented by Time Equities' CEO Francis J. Greenburger to the Financial District, Battery Park City and Quality of Life committees of Community Board 1. On October 5, 2007, they were approved by the City Planning Commission. Initially the building plans fought opposition arising from the fact that the tower did not include money for affordable housing, but later a $5 million agreement settled this situation, including $430,000 to local P.S./I.S. 89 for a computer science program. The site was occupied by two buildings, one of them being a 1912 13-story building, known as the Crystal Building that has a 3-story-high mansard roof, which were demolished between the end of 2007 and the first months of 2008.

Developer Time Equities broke ground in June 2008 on a 66-story hotel/condo tower at 50 West Street. By the fall of 2008, construction work had stopped due to the 2008 financial crisis, and, according to Mr. Greenburger, was saved for better times. In 2011, the developer obtained new construction permits. The hotel, which was planned to be located in the first fourteen floors, was discarded and substituted by multilevel retail space. In addition, after damage from Hurricane Sandy in 2012, the developers decided to make the building flood-resistant by rising the sill height on the ground floor and using floodgates at the entrances, as well as moving the mechanical room to higher floors.

In August 2013, Time Equities' CEO Francis Greenburger secured a $288 million loan from PNC Financial Services, Wells Fargo, M&T Bank, MUFG Union Bank, MidFirst Bank, Emigrant Bank, and another anonymous benefactor. An additional $110 million in equity was raised from hedge fund Elliott Management Corporation, and work was resumed after a five-year delay. In December 2013, Time Equities launched a teaser website for 50 West Street which revealed new renderings and showcased the panoramic views of the tower. Facing south, landmarks like Governors Island, the Statue of Liberty, and Ellis Island can be seen.

Sales started in spring 2014 and construction was scheduled to be completed in 2016. The building topped out in September 2015. Occupancy began in 2017. Their campaign called 'Defy the Laws of Luxury' was launched in October 2016. The campaign won two 2016-2017 ADDY Awards, one for Online/Interactive Website and one for Still Photography.

== Amenities ==
The building contains 191 residential units, ranging from one to four bedrooms, including an array of duplexed and double height living rooms throughout all the tower. and two penthouses. Sales for available units range in price from $1,960,000 to $22,645,000. Though rumors exist among the luxury real estate community that the owner of penthouse 2 (PH2) has listed their apartment for sale in the medium eight figures. Four floors of the building are devoted to state-of-the-art amenities such as a water club including a swimming pool, sauna, steam room, hot tub, fitness room, a lounge with sofas, private screening room, children's playroom and gym, game room, demonstration kitchen and dining room, library, as well as a dining terrace.

The building has an open air, private observation deck that sits in the 64th floor atop the building at 734 feet (224 m). It is equipped with binocular tower viewers, loungers, barbecue stations and private dining areas.

== See also ==
- List of tallest buildings in New York City
