= Crystal Building =

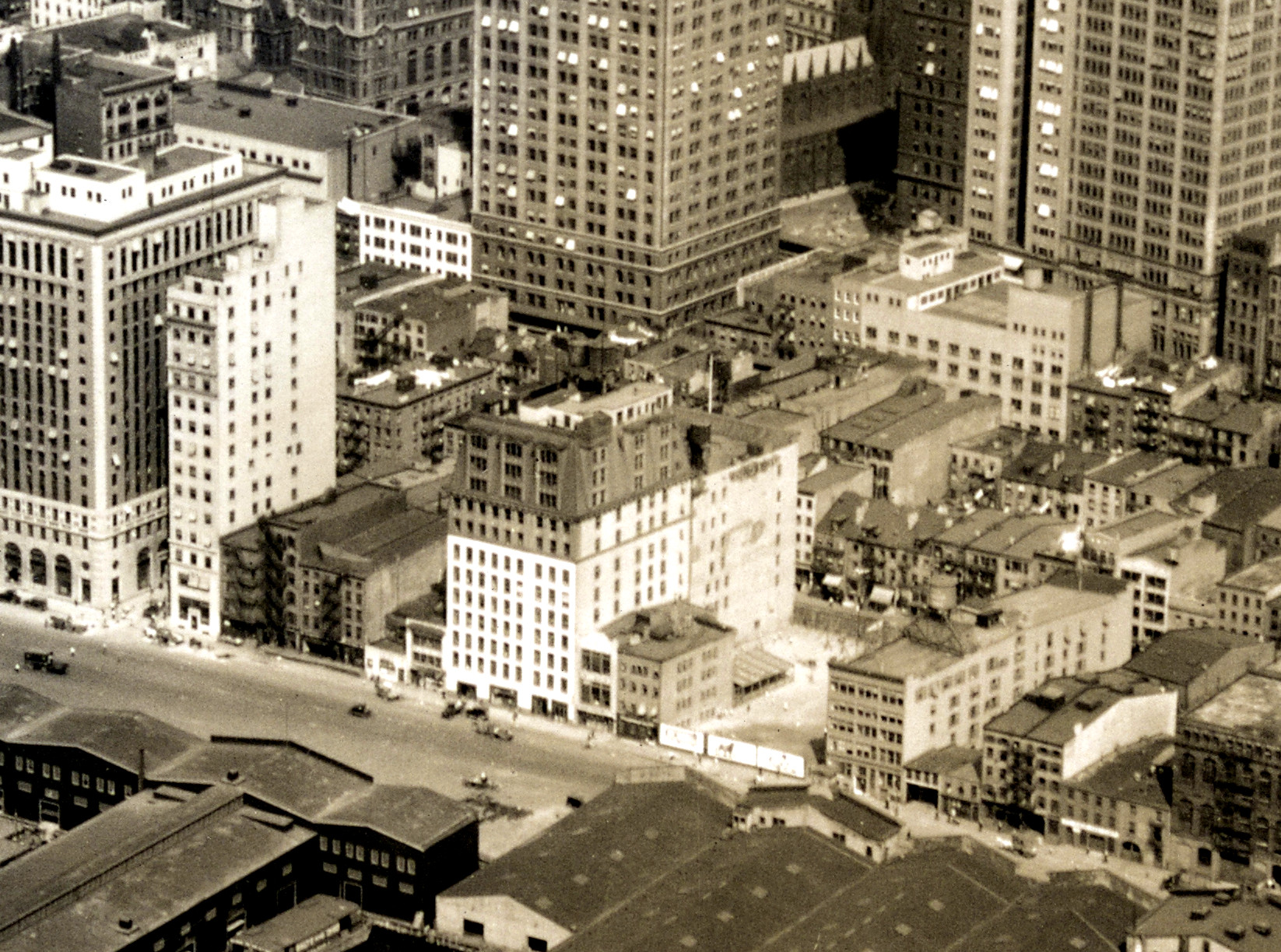
- Crystal Building (center) in 1924
- Interactive map of the Crystal Building area

General information
- Status: Demolished
- Type: Commercial offices
- Location: 47-49 West Street, Manhattan, New York City, United States
- Coordinates: 40°42′28″N 74°0′54″W
- Construction started: 1912 (114 years ago).
- Demolished: 2007 – 2008; 18 years ago.

The Crystal Building was an office building located in 49 West Street, at the western side of Lower Manhattan. It opened in 1913, becoming one of the tallest buildings in Little Syria. The building stood approximately 12 stories tall. Its most distinctive architectural feature was a three-story mansard roof.

In 1994, it was consider converting vacant floors of the Crystal Building into residential space. The proposal took two years to secure financing, and in 1996 the eighth through eleventh floors were being converted into live-work units.

In 2007, demolition of the Crystal Building began to make way for the construction of 50 West Street. However, construction could not begin until 2014 due to the 2008 financial crisis.
