= Big Duck =

Historic commercial building in New York

- The Big Duck
- U.S. National Register of Historic Places
- New York State Register of Historic Places
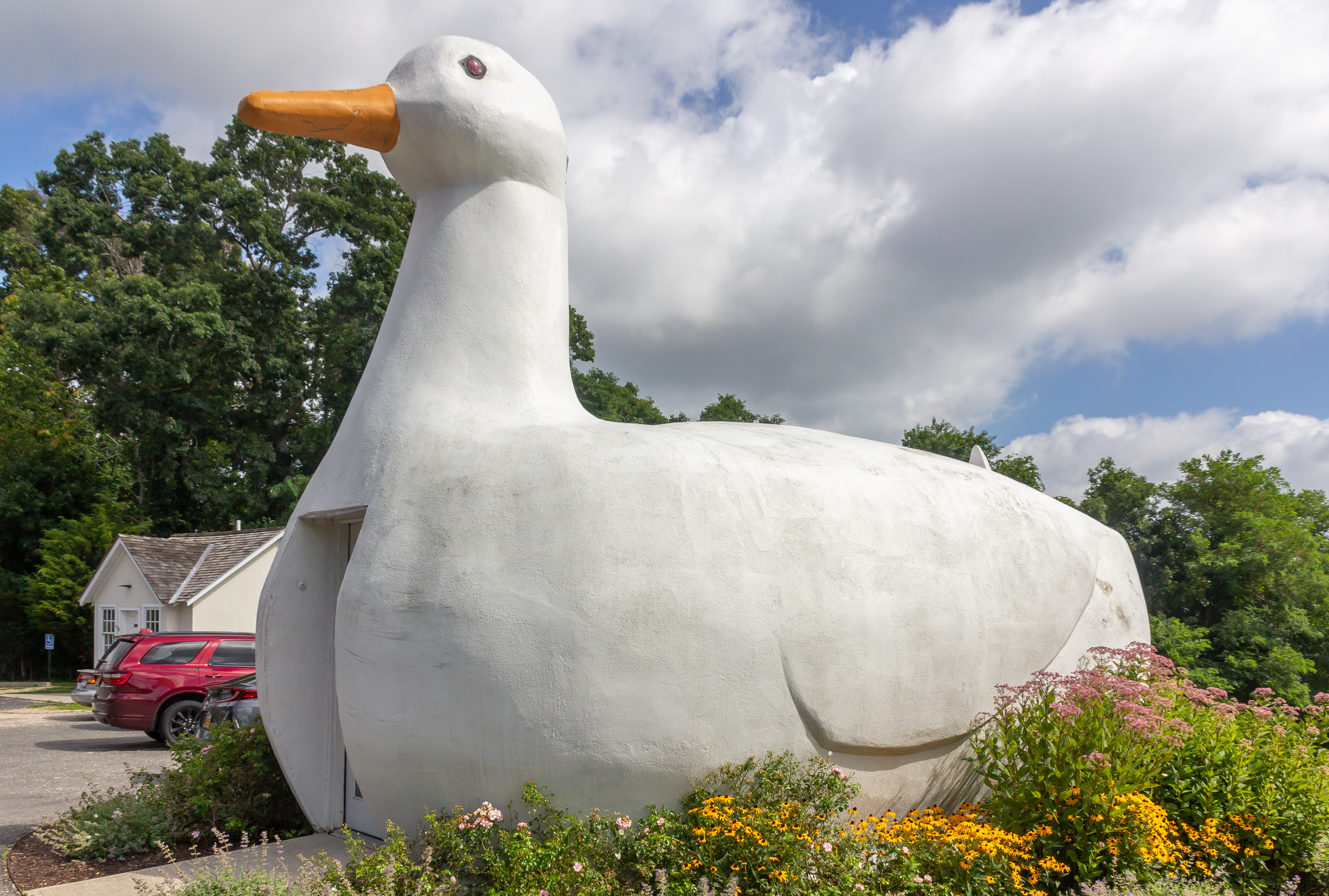
- Big Duck in 2018
- Interactive map showing the Big Duck's location
- Location: Flanders, New York
- Coordinates: 40°54′25.9″N 72°37′20.6″W
- Built: 1931
- Architectural style: Novelty architecture
- Website: bigduck.org
- NRHP reference No.: 97000164

Significant dates
- Added to NRHP: April 28, 1997
- Designated NYSRHP: January 17, 1997

The Big Duck is a 20-foot-tall (6.1 m) ferrocement building in the shape of a duck: a canonical example of novelty architecture. Built in 1931 in Riverhead, New York, United States, it was moved several times to various locations on eastern Long Island, ending up in Flanders in 2007. Well-known for its distinctive appearance, this structure inspired the word duck as a common term in academic literature used to refer to buildings shaped like everyday objects or to describe excessive ornamentation used in graphical presentations of data.

The Big Duck was built in 1931 by duck farmer Martin Maurer for use as a shop to sell ducks and duck eggs. This was during a period when duck farming was a growing industry on eastern Long Island and novelty architecture was on the rise due to the increasing popularity of automobiles. The building attracted both widespread academic criticism and public acclaim. It was added to both the National Register of Historic Places and the New York State Register of Historic Places in 1997 and is a principal building on the Big Duck Ranch, which was listed on both registers in 2008.

== Background ==
The Big Duck is a duck-shaped building in Flanders, New York, 15 by 30 feet (4.6 by 9.1 m) in plan and 20 feet (6.1 m) tall to the top of the head, enclosing 11 by 15 feet (3.4 by 4.6 m) of interior space. An example of novelty architecture (also known as mimetic architecture), it was designed in 1931 by duck farmer Martin Maurer for use as a farm shop as well as for publicity. The use of mimetic architecture for roadside buildings was a growing trend in the United States by the late 1920s, with buildings having been constructed in the shape of a giant milk bottle, a tea kettle, a dog, and a tepee. The increasing popularity of the automobile meant that people were driving past roadside stores at high speed, necessitating large displays (described by landscape preservationist John Auwaerter as being of "bizarre scale") to attract the attention of passing motorists.

Duck farming on the east end of Long Island started as a means for farmers to earn additional income, possibly in the early 19th century. The regional industry expanded when the American Pekin breed was introduced to the area in 1873; by 1915 it included nearly a dozen farms with a combined annual production of one million ducks. In 1939, approximately 90 farms in Suffolk County were producing an aggregate of three million ducks annually; many of these were out of business by the 1980s due to changing environmental regulations and increased real-estate prices. By 2015, only the Crescent Duck Farm, which had opened in 1908 in Aquebogue, remained.

Maurer was inspired by a building he had seen during a 1931 trip to California. He had stopped at the Ben-Hur Coffee Shop on Wilshire Boulevard in Los Angeles which was topped by a 15-foot tall stucco coffee pot. Reportedly, Maurer started planning the Big Duck while eating lunch that day, sketching the design on a napkin.

== Construction ==
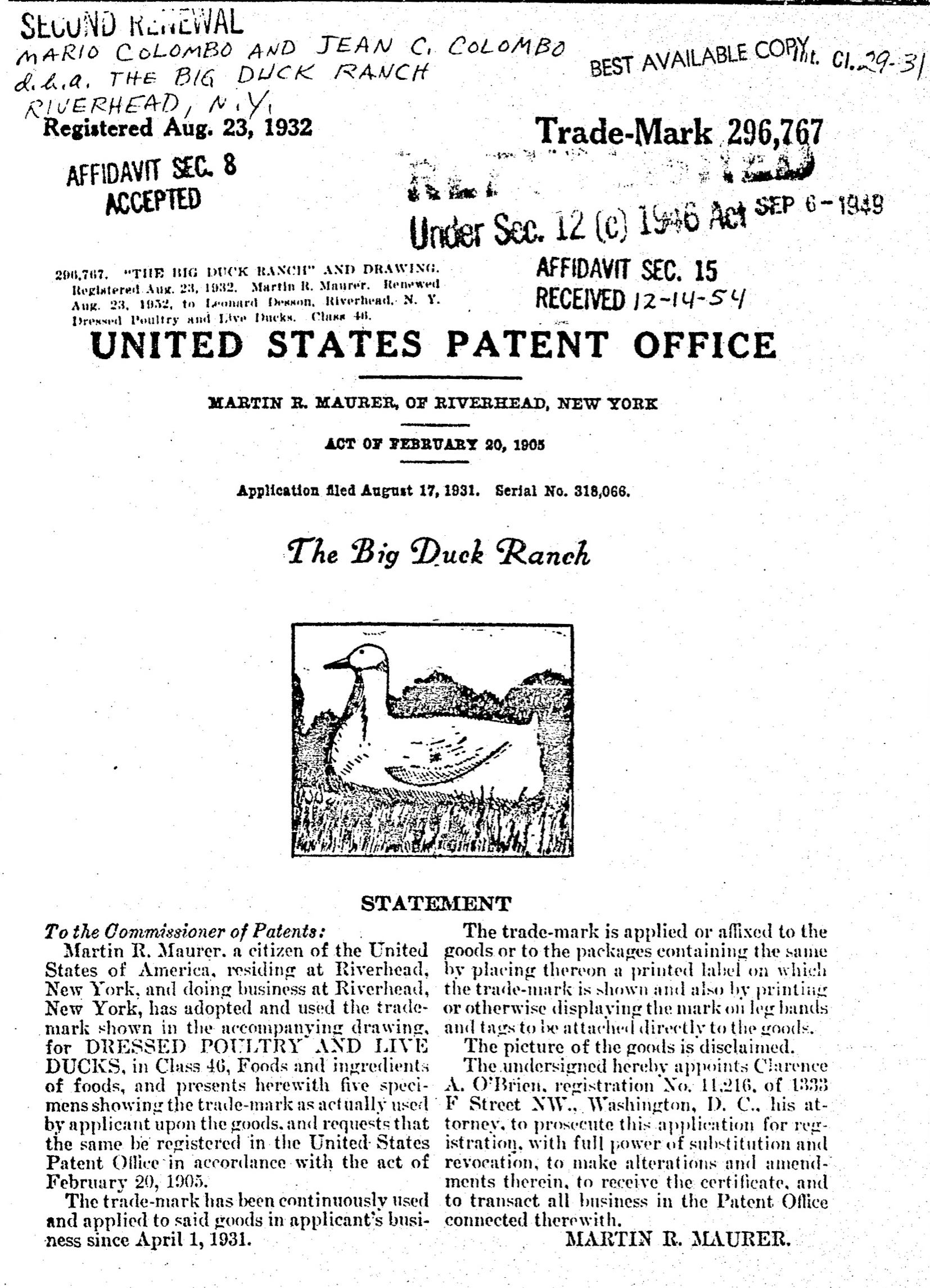
US Trademark 296,767: The Big Duck Ranch

After returning home from his California trip, Maurer talked to local contractors about building the duck-shaped shop, but could not find any who wanted the job. He ended up hiring carpenter George Reeve, along with William and Samuel Collins, brothers who worked in New York theatres as set and prop designers. A live duck was used as a model, and a cooked chicken carcass was examined to ensure an anatomically accurate structure. After the wooden framework was complete, wire mesh was added and a masonry subcontractor, Smith & Yeager, was brought in to finish the job with four coats of Atlas Cement, a building method known as ferrocement. Construction costs totaled $3,800 (equivalent to $64,700 in 2025). The eyes, made from the tail lights of a Ford Model T, glowed red at night.

The Big Duck opened for business in June 1931, selling ducks and duck eggs. In August, Maurer applied for a trademark for "The Big Duck Ranch"; it was granted a year later, renewed in 1972, and expired in 1993. The building was featured on the Atlas Cement Company's 1931 promotional calendar and the November 1932 issue of Popular Mechanics covered it briefly, noting that it contained a salesroom and an office and sat on a foundation of concrete blocks. A miniature version was installed at the 1939 World's Fair by the Drake Baking Company, with the condition that it be destroyed once the fair was over.

=== Relocations ===
Big Duck locations: (1) Riverhead, (2) Flanders, (3) Sears Bellows Park

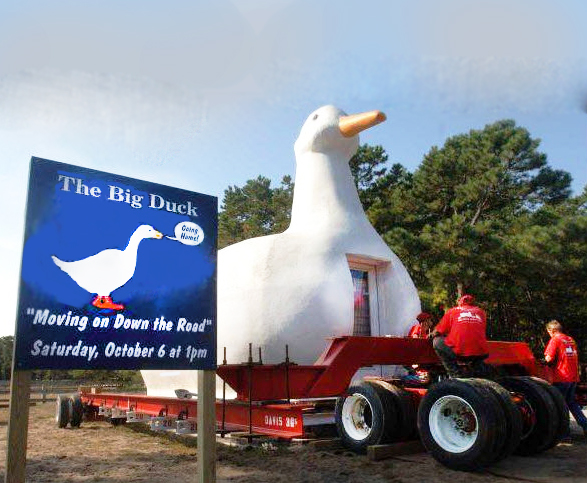
Moving the Big Duck, 1988

The building was originally constructed in 1931 on West Main Street (New York State Route 25) in the Upper Mills section of Riverhead. In 1937, Maurer had the building lifted from its foundation and relocated to his new duck ranch in Flanders, four miles (6.4 km) away.

The Big Duck closed as a store in 1984. Four years later, the Suffolk County Department of Parks and Recreation acquired the building, moved it to Sears Bellows County Park between Flanders and Hampton Bays, and repurposed it as a gift shop operated by the Friends for Long Island Heritage. The Department of Parks publicized the move with a "Lost My Nest" sign soliciting donations; keeping with the mimetic theme, it was shaped like a giant suitcase with a handle on top.

In 2004, a proposal was made to move the Big Duck to Long Island MacArthur Airport in Ronkonkoma, with the move estimated to cost at least $60,000 (equivalent to $98,000 in 2025). Proponents suggested this would increase the number of visitors and help publicize the airport's new terminal building but the move never happened and the building was returned to its 1937 Flanders location on October 6, 2007. Local house moving contractor Guy Davis donated the cost of the four-mile move and the Town of Southampton picked up the $50,000 in costs (equivalent to $75,000 in 2025) to prepare the route. The location of the building as of 2022 is accessible from the Long Island Rail Road via the Riverhead station.

== Popular reaction ==
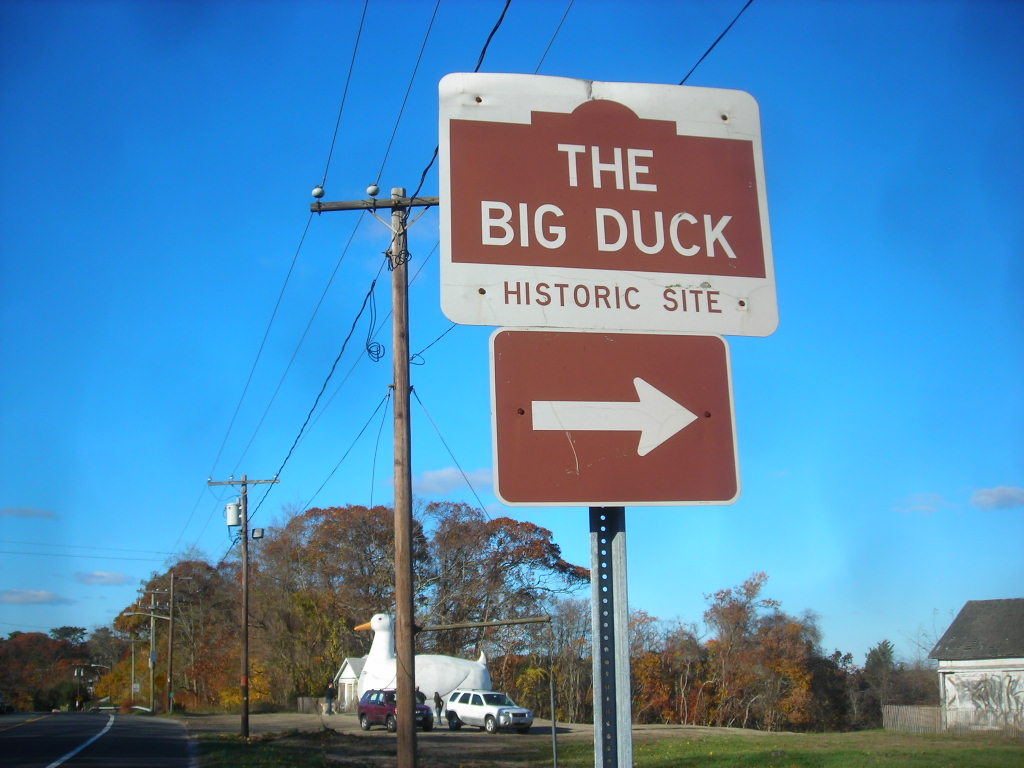
Historic site marker on New York State Route 24 before the Duck

Buildings such as the Big Duck are classified as novelty or mimetic architecture, with the term duck used more specifically to describe buildings that are in the shape of an everyday object to which they relate. In 1997, the Big Duck was listed on the National Register of Historic Places and also on the New York State Register of Historic Places. The Big Duck Ranch, where the Big Duck is located, was individually added to the National Register in 2008.

A drawing of the building by Saul Steinberg was featured on the May 11, 1987, cover of The New Yorker. In her 2015 book, historian Marilyn Weigold called the building an "impressive piece of folk art". In a tradition dating to 1988, the Big Duck is lit up for Christmas each year, with local residents attending the ceremony. Joshua Needelman of Newsday compared the event to the annual lighting of the tree at Rockefeller Center in New York City, noting that the latter tradition began in 1931, the year of the Big Duck's construction.

An attempt was made in 1997 to turn the structure into a museum consisting of fifteen buildings typical of an early 20th-century Long Island roadside. The project had been proposed by the Suffolk County Department of Parks with support from the New York Council on the Arts but was unable to make any progress due to insufficient funding and legal obstacles. The latter included land-use regulations protecting the surrounding pine barren and a lawsuit which prevented a planned donation of a diner from being completed.

== Academic commentary ==
=== Architecture ===
Images from God's Own Junkyard

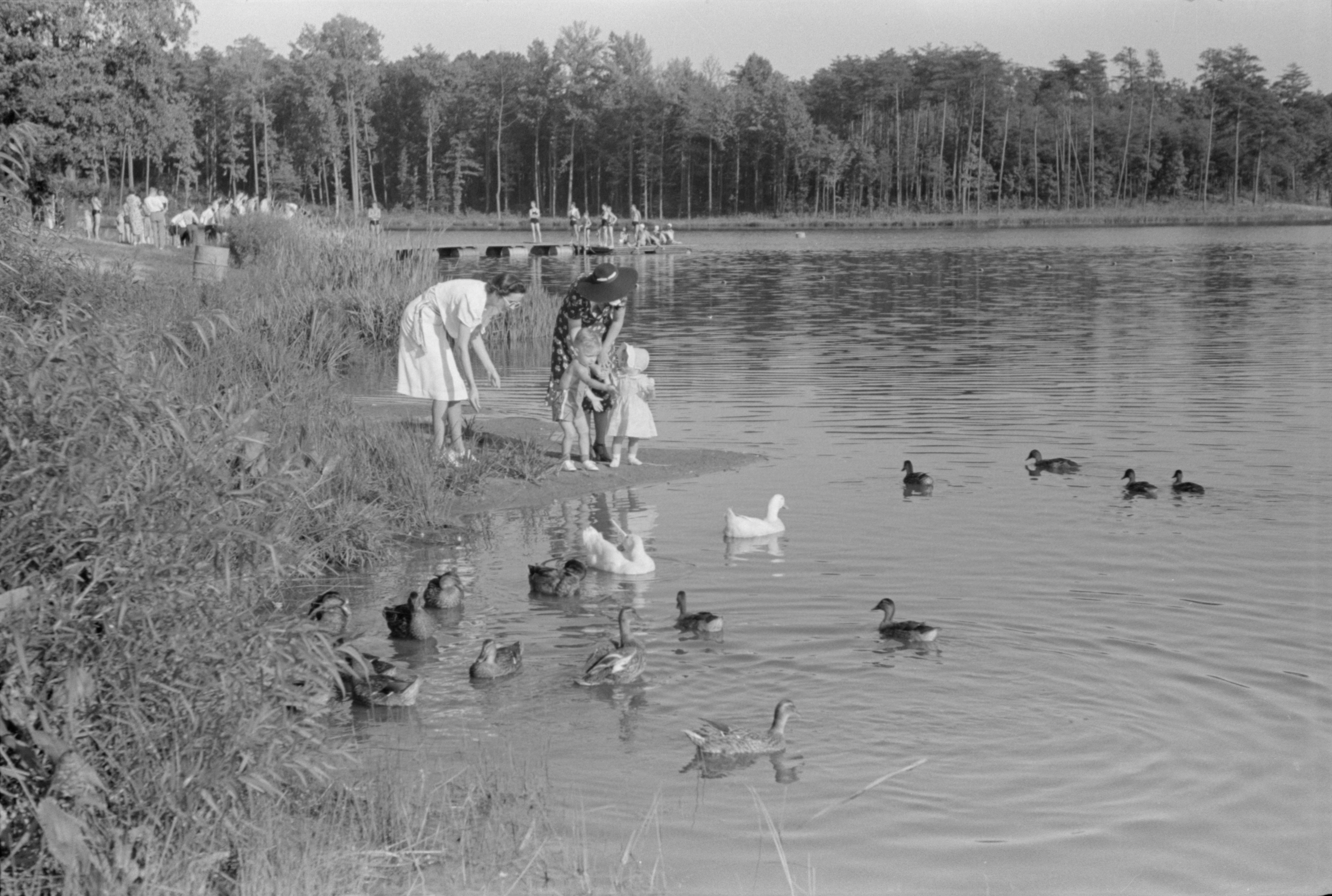
Taken by Marion Post Wolcott, 1938

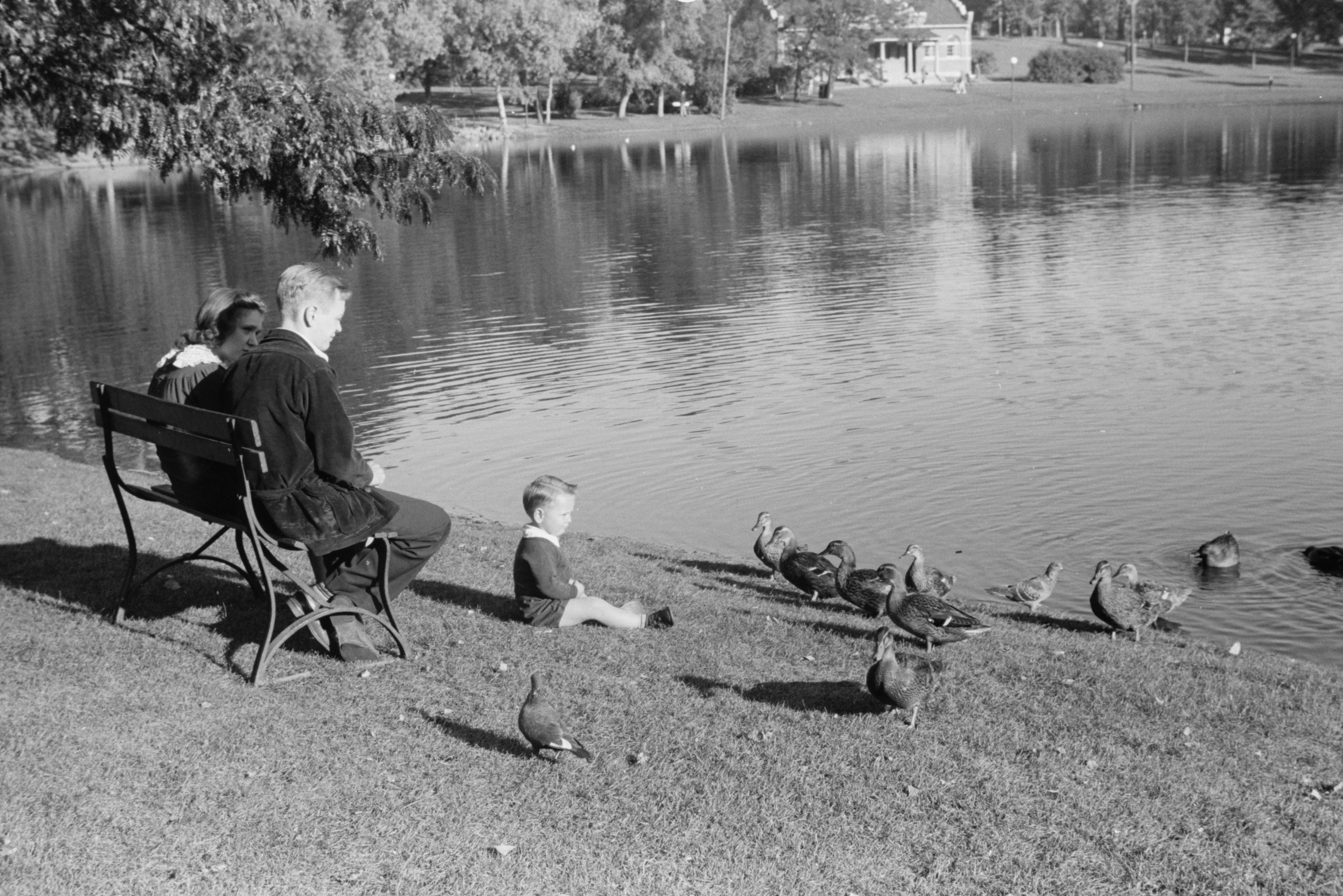
Taken by John Vachon, 1939

Peter Blake, the managing editor of Architectural Forum, was one of the first architects to criticize the Big Duck, offering a pessimistic view of the building and the commercialism it represented in his 1964 book God's Own Junkyard. In the preface, he wrote that his book was "a deliberate attack upon all those who have already befouled a large portion of this country for private gain" and Ada Louise Huxtable wrote in her New York Times book review that it decried the "babel of billboards" and automobile-focused Googie architecture. Blake was familiar with the building from summers he had spent in the nearby Hamptons; he presented his own photo of it opposite those by Marion Post Wolcott and John Vachon showing idyllic scenes of families with small children playing among ducks at the edge of a pond.

Architects Robert Venturi and Denise Scott Brown wrote about ducks in a 1971 Architectural Forum article without explicitly defining what they meant by the term as they would in later publications. The two stated that modernist architects had ceased to apply ornamentation to their designs and were instead making the buildings themselves the ornamentation: "In promoting Space and Articulation over symbolism and ornament they distorted the whole building into a duck." They concluded the article by urging their peers to heed the advice of 19th-century architect Augustus Pugin that it was "all right to decorate construction but never to construct decoration".

More famously, Venturi and Scott Brown wrote about the disparity between highway signs that advertise businesses and the buildings that house those businesses in their 1977 book, Learning from Las Vegas. Using U.S. Route 66 as an example, they observed that the signs are large, vulgar, and consume a disparate portion of the business's budget. The buildings on the other hand are smaller, more modest, and cheap. They contrasted this with the Big Duck – which they referred to as "The Long Island Duckling" – calling it a "sculptural symbol and architectural shelter", noting that "Sometimes the building is the sign." They used the term duck to refer to "a special building that is a symbol", as differentiated from a "conventional shelter that applies symbols", which they called a "decorated shed". Seven years after Las Vegas, Howard Mansfield wrote that the book had resulted in the duck becoming a "popular character actor", working its way into the academic vernacular and appearing frequently in journals such as Architectural Forum. Huxtable referred to ducks often in her reviews, to describe "buildings straining after symbolism when there is nothing to symbolize."

By 1972, James Wines, writing in Architectural Forum, observed that the Big Duck was often used as a negative example by architects and critics writing in academic publications, tracing this back to Blake. Wines called the building "an extraordinary example of indigenous American roadway architecture" although he described the scale of the building as "absurd", saying that it was "too small for a store and too big for a duck". He said the Big Duck ignores the modernist axiom that form follows function and posited the alternative Duck Design Theory, that "form follows fantasy".

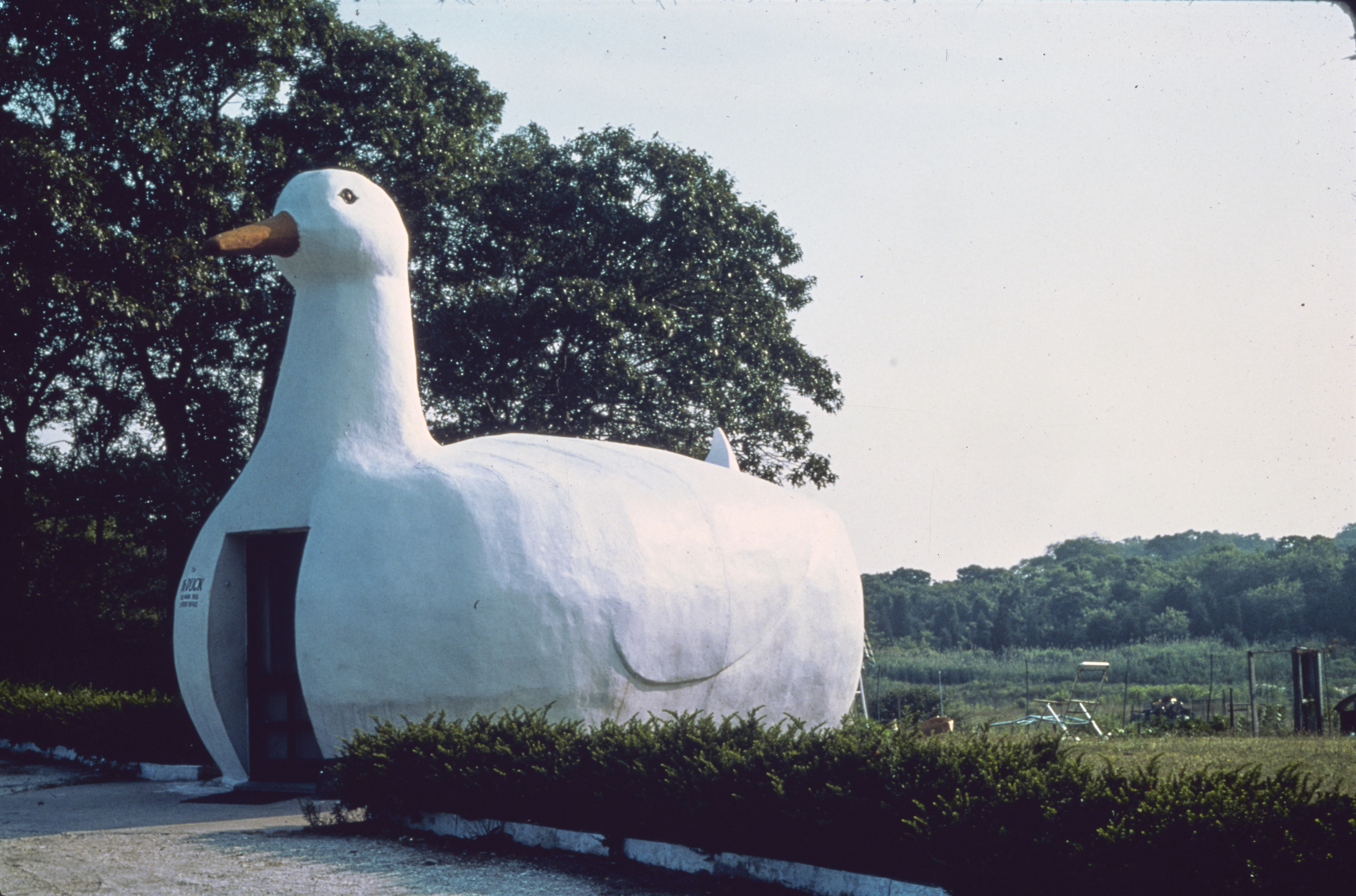
Photographed by John Margolies, between 1972 and 2008

Architectural historian Gabrielle Esperdy argued in American Autopia that the Big Duck's immortality came not from Blake's original inclusion as one photo out of more than a hundred, but from Venturi and Scott Brown's "appropriation" of the building in their own book. She credited Learning from Las Vegas with inspiring roadside photographer John Margolies to make his own image of the building and leading to its inclusion on the National Register. In another historical treatment, Luis Miguel Lus Arana and Gabriele Neri also ascribed the Big Duck's fame to Venturi, adding that the building possesses a "proud obliviousness to its own tackiness". Journalist Phil Patton presented a different view in The All-American Roadside. He argued that the Big Duck's path to notoriety had to do not so much with its form, but rather with an accident of its location that exposed it to New York's architectural and artistic circles. In addition to being near Peter Blake's summer home, it was not far from the house of well-known artist Jackson Pollock.

Architecture professor Caroline O'Donnell used the Big Duck as an example of architecture parlante in her 2015 book Niche Topics. She defined the term, coined in 1852, as "an expression of programmatic meaning through form in a humorous and sometimes provocative way". The fact that the building looked funny was a key differentiator between being merely a decorated shed and being a duck. Humanities professor Margaret Grubiak examined the Ark Encounter Christian theme park in her 2020 treatment of religious architecture, Monumental Jesus. She described the park's full-scale recreation of Noah's Ark as "an architectural paradox of sculpture and building" and compared it to the Big Duck for the literalist advertising function they both perform.

=== Information design ===
Information scientist and statistician Edward Tufte's The Visual Display of Quantitative Information uses the term duck in a different context, saying it is explicitly named after the Big Duck to describe irrelevant decorative elements in information design:

When a graphic is taken over by decorative forms or computer debris, when the data measures and structures become Design Elements, when the overall design purveys Graphical Style rather than quantitative information, then the graphic may be called a duck in honor of the duck-form store, "Big Duck." For this building the whole structure is itself decoration, just as in the duck data graphic.

Tufte describes ducks as "flamboyant" and "marginally useful", lumping them into the larger category of "chartjunk".
