= Flanders, New York =

- Hamlet and census-designated place
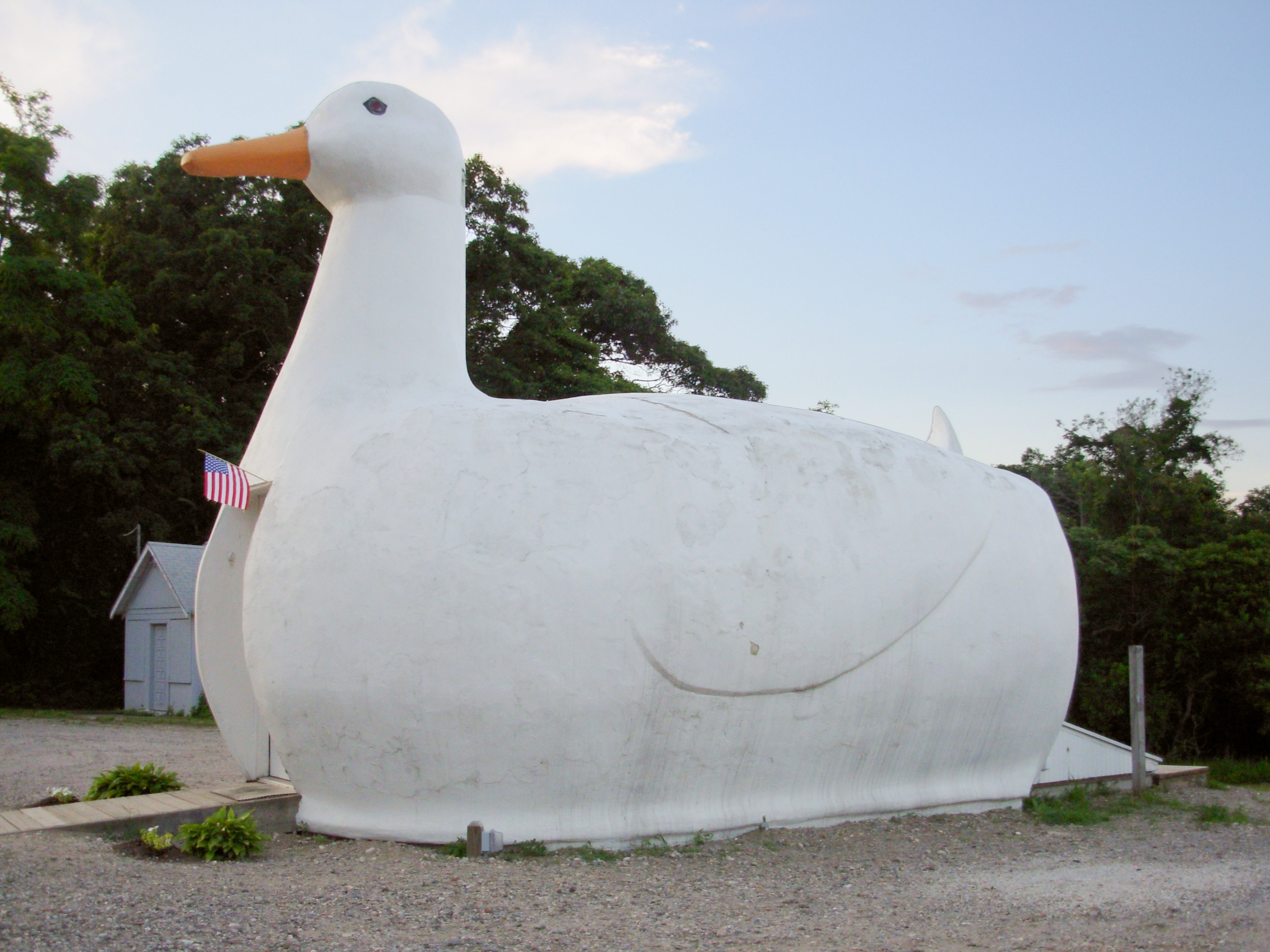
- The Big Duck along New York State Route 24 in Flanders.

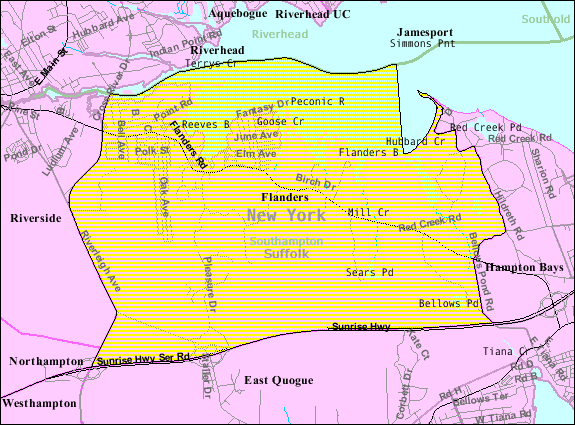

- Location on Long Island Location within the state of New York
- Coordinates: 40°54′12″N 72°37′4″W
- Country: United States
- State: New York
- County: Suffolk
- Town: Southampton

Area
  - Total: 12.38 sq mi (32.07 km^{2})
  - Land: 11.50 sq mi (29.78 km^{2})
  - Water: 0.88 sq mi (2.29 km^{2})
- Elevation: 6.6 ft (2 m)

Population (2020)
  - Total: 5,098
  - Density: 443.3/sq mi (171.17/km^{2})
- Time zone: UTC-5 (Eastern (EST))
  - Summer (DST): UTC-4 (EDT)
- ZIP code: 11901
- Area codes: 631, 934
- FIPS code: 36-26121

Flanders is a hamlet and a census-designated place (CDP) in Suffolk County, on Long Island, in New York, United States. The population was 5,095 at the time of the 2020 census.

It is located in the town of Southampton on the south side of the Peconic River at its mouth in Peconic Bay, roughly at the start of the South Fork of Long Island. Riverhead is across the river to the north.

== History ==
Flanders is the location of the Big Duck, Big Duck Ranch, and the James Benjamin Homestead. These historic sites are all listed on the National Register of Historic Places, along with the New York State Register of Historic Places.

== Geography ==
According to the United States Census Bureau, the CDP has a total area of 11.6 square miles (30.1 km^{2}), of which 11.5 square miles (29.7 km^{2}) is land and 0.15 square miles (0.4 km^{2}), or 1.49%, is water.

Historical population
Census	Pop.	Note	%±
2010	4,705		—
2020	5,098		8.4%
U.S. Decennial Census

== Demographics ==
=== 2020 census ===
As of the 2020 census, Flanders had a population of 5,098. The median age was 34.6 years. 25.3% of residents were under the age of 18 and 11.1% of residents were 65 years of age or older. For every 100 females there were 110.1 males, and for every 100 females age 18 and over there were 109.0 males age 18 and over.

74.5% of residents lived in urban areas, while 25.5% lived in rural areas.

There were 1,492 households in Flanders, of which 40.1% had children under the age of 18 living in them. Of all households, 45.2% were married-couple households, 20.8% were households with a male householder and no spouse or partner present, and 23.5% were households with a female householder and no spouse or partner present. About 20.9% of all households were made up of individuals and 8.9% had someone living alone who was 65 years of age or older.

There were 1,714 housing units, of which 13.0% were vacant. The homeowner vacancy rate was 1.9% and the rental vacancy rate was 4.6%.

Racial composition as of the 2020 census
Race	Number	Percent
White	1,895	37.2%
Black or African American	444	8.7%
American Indian and Alaska Native	129	2.5%
Asian	40	0.8%
Native Hawaiian and Other Pacific Islander	0	0.0%
Some other race	1,945	38.2%
Two or more races	645	12.7%
Hispanic or Latino (of any race)	2,764	54.2%

=== 2010 census ===
As of the census of 2010, there were 4,705 people, 1,797 households, and 1,068 families residing in the CDP. The population density was 297.1 inhabitants per square mile (114.7/km^{2}). There were 1,797 housing units at an average density of 124.0 per square mile (47.9/km^{2}). The racial makeup of the CDP was 25.63% White, 21.12% African American, 8.05% Native American, 1.04% Asian, 2.08% from other races, and 12.06% from two or more races. Hispanic or Latino of any race were 42.08% of the population.

There were 652 households that had children under the age of 18 living with them, 47.5% were married couples living together, 16.4% had a female householder with no husband present, and 29.4% were non-families. 21.5% of all households were made up of individuals, and 7.0% had someone living alone who was 65 years of age or older. The average household size was 3.28 and the average family size was 3.41.

In the CDP, the population was spread out, with 19% under the age of 18, 5.6% from 18 to 24, 52.7% from 15 to 44, 20.9% from 45 to 64, and 6.8% who were 65 years of age or older. The median age was 36.1 years. For every 100 females, there were 149.2 males.

The median income for a household in the CDP was $82,868, and the median income for a family was $69,615. Males had a median income of $46,844 versus $34,833 for females. The per capita income for the CDP was $26,274. About 15.7% of families and 16.2% of the population were below the poverty line, including 16.9% of those under age 18 and none of those age 65 or over.
