= Portia Munson =

American visual artist

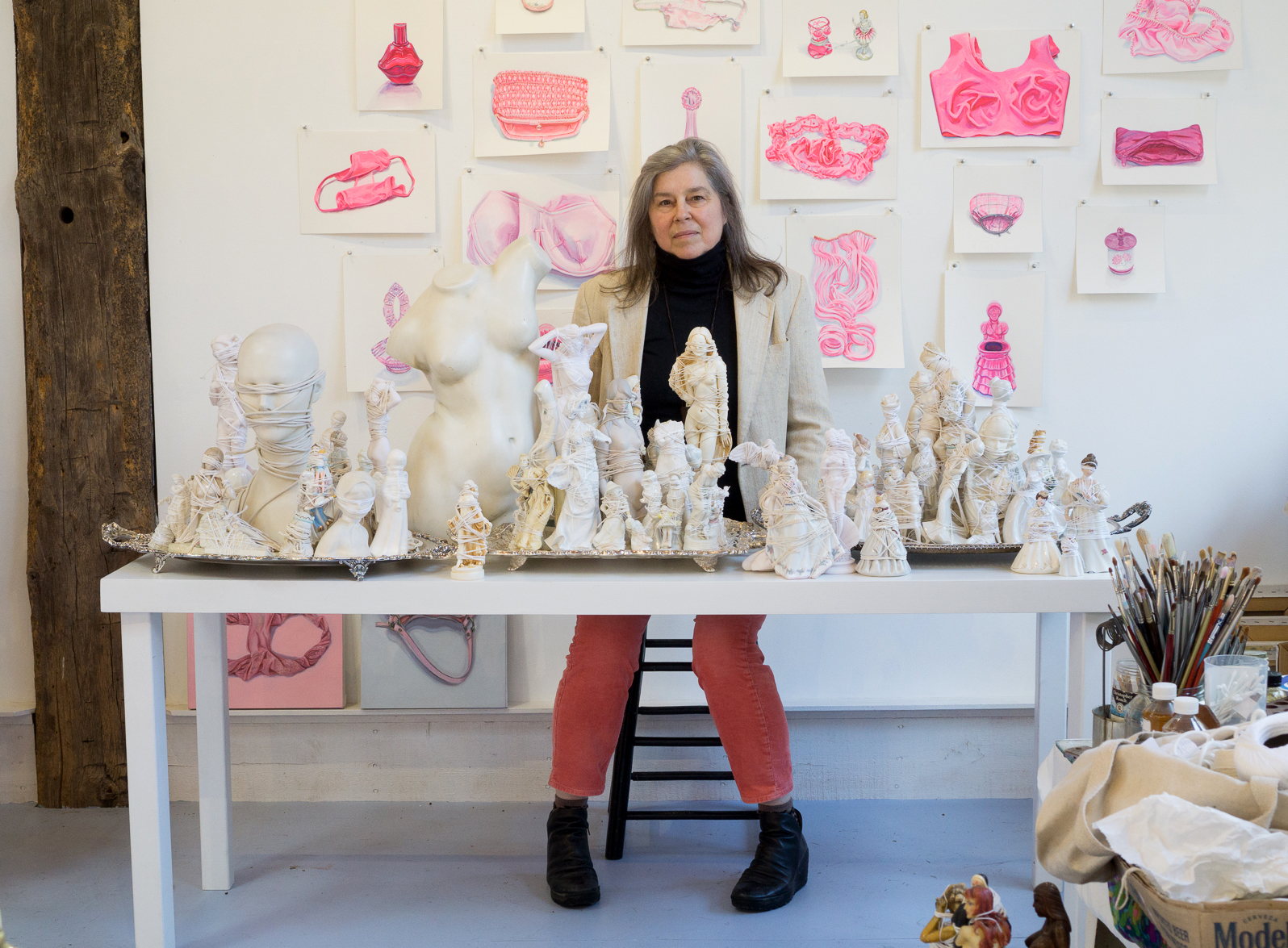
- Portia Munson in her Studio
- Born: 1961 (age 64–65)
- Education: 1990 Master of Fine Arts, Mason Gross School of Art, Rutgers University, New Brunswick, NJ; 1983 Bachelor of Fine Arts, Cooper Union School of Art, New York, NY
- Website: www.portiamunson.com

Portia Munson (born 1961) is an American visual artist who works in sculpture, installation, painting, and digital photography, focusing on themes related to the environment and feminism. Her work includes large-scale agglomerations of mass-produced plastic found objects arranged by color, as well as small oil paintings of individual domestic found objects, and digital photographs of flowers, weeds, and dead animals found near her home in upstate New York.

== Education ==
Munson received a BFA from Cooper Union School of Art in 1983 and earned an MFA from Mason Gross School of Art at Rutgers University in 1990. She also studied at the Skowhegan School of Painting and Sculpture in Skowhegan, Maine in 1987.

== Career ==
Munson first achieved notoriety with her work “Pink Project: Table” in the "Bad Girls" show at the New Museum, New York, in 1994, consisting of thousands of pink plastic found objects spread out on a table. A similar sculpture consisting of accumulations of pink objects encased in glass vitrines appeared in Munson's 1994 solo show at Yoshii Gallery in New York. Critic Amanda Boetzkes writes: "A key aspect of Munson’s practice is the reorganization of these objects according to new taxonomies, sometimes classifying according to size, shape, and shade, while at other times she resorts to haphazard gathering, mounding, and containing." She goes on to explain that "Pink Project" "summarizes a hyperbolic femininity produced and mediated through the dissemination of products: girls’ dolls, baby pacifiers, hair accessories, mirrors, fake nails, cleaning products, and so on." Writing in the New York Times, Holland Cotter said, “Both assemblages generate a number of ideas, from how a culture infantilizes women and then markets that notion of femininity, to the way practically everyone shapes a sense of self through the accumulation of disposable things.” “Pink Project: Table” was shown again in 2016 at the Frieze Art Fair, London.

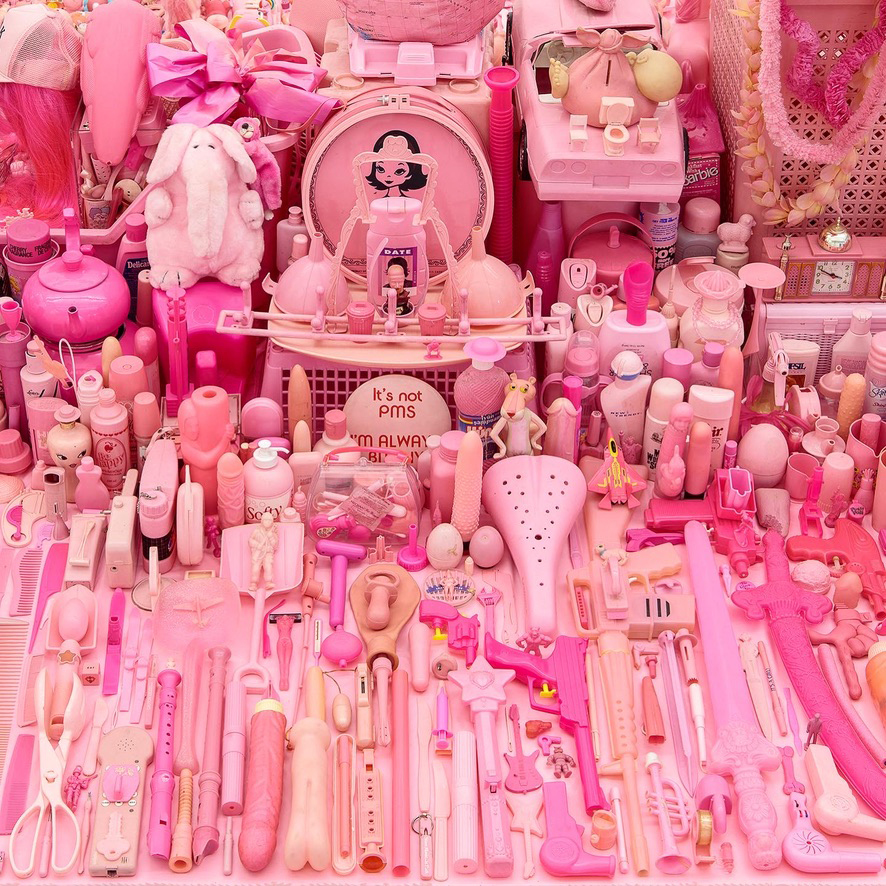
Pink Project Table (Detail)

Boetzkes further characterizes "Pink Projects" and another work, "Green Piece", as considering "the cultural significance of commodities through their accumulation and redistribution." She goes on to explain that in her view, Munson's work "can be taken as a protracted meditation on the materiality of plastic, as objects cycle from absurd commodity to meaningless thing to excessive substance." In "Green Piece," Boetzkes explains that "green politics is made explicit, as green is shown in the proliferation of objects needed to tend suburban lawns – fly swatters, lawn furniture, garden hoses, yard tools, AstroTurf, bug spray – alongside plastic cucumbers and artificial plants."

Other major works include “Bound Angel”, first exhibited in a solo show at P·P·O·W in 2022, a large-scale installation of a table adorned with mostly white figurines depicting angels, madonnas and “perfect” women, bound with ropes and string. John Vincler, of the New York Times, wrote about the show: “It’s hard to pull off the alchemist’s trick of turning tchotchkes and kitsch into art gold, but the Catskill, New York-based artist Portia Munson manages this handily, as if a rigorous method were applied to a hoarder’s madness, with intuitive groupings and hints of classification discernible within the clutter.” Vincler continues, “[The work’s] … hit differently in the aftermath of the Supreme Court overturning Roe v. Wade. Either bound or reduced to cheap commodities, the femme body is offered up, fragmented and put on display, all but asking aloud: Whose bodily autonomy?”

Portia Munson's work has been the subject of over twenty solo exhibitions at P·P·O·W, New York, NY; White Columns, New York, NY; MASS MoCA, North Adams, MA; Bedford Gallery, The Museum of Sex, New York, NY, Walnut Creek, CA; and Olana State Historic Site, Hudson, NY, among others. Munson’s work has also been included in numerous international group exhibitions including, Still, Life! Mourning, Meaning, Mending, 21c Louisville, Louisville, KY; Cross Pollination: Heade, Cole, Church, and our Contemporary Moment, Olana State Historic Site, Hudson, NY; Dime-Store Alchemy, curated by Jonathan Rider, FLAG Art Foundation, New York, NY; Beyond Boundaries: Feminine Forms, Pennsylvania Academy of the Fine Arts, Philadelphia, PA; Objectophilia; Biennial of the Americas, Museum of Contemporary Art, Denver, CO; and Bad Girls, curated by Marcia Tucker, New Museum of Contemporary Art, New York, NY, among others. In summer 2022, Munson presented three solo exhibitions, Bound Angel, P·P·O·W, New York, NY; Portia Munson: Flood, Art Omi, Ghent, NY; and Memento Mori, Pamela Salisbury Gallery, Hudson, NY. In 2023, her work was included in Rituals of Devotion at the McEvoy Foundation for the Arts, San Francisco, CA. Portia Munson: The Pink Bedroom was exhibited at the Museum of Sex, New York, NY in 2023.

Munson is the recipient of several notable fellowship / residencies, including ones at The MacDowell Colony in 1992, 1993, 1998, and 2019, Cill Rialaig in 2021, Civitella Ranieri in 2019, and Yaddo in 1999. Munson was awarded a Pollock-Krasner Foundation Grant in 2019. She has also been a visiting artist / lecturer at a number of prestigious institutions, including Yale School of Art, Rhode Island School of Design, The New Museum for Contemporary Art, Parsons School of Design, CAL Arts, and Massachusetts College of Art, among others.

Munson’s public works include “Pink Projects” with the Art Production Fund, Rockefeller Center, New York, NY (2019); “Art in the Terminal,” the Albany International Airport, Albany, NY; MTA Arts for Transit, Bryant Park MTA Station, New York, NY. Munson was commissioned in 2012 by the Arts and Design program of New York City's Metropolitan Transportation Authority to create a permanent laminated glass display for the Fort Hamilton Parkway station, on the elevated portion of the West End (D train) line. Munson's artwork “Gardens of Fort Hamilton Parkway Station” consists of symmetrical arrangements of flowers, florets, petals and weeds from her own garden.

Her work is in the collections of the Pennsylvania Academy of the Fine Arts, Philadelphia; 21C International Contemporary Art Museum, Louisville, Ky.; The Museum of Sex, New York, NY, and the Nerman Museum of Contemporary Art, Kansas City, Mo.

== Exhibitions ==
- 2023 “Portia Munson: The Pink Bedroom,” Museum of Sex, New York, NY
- 2022 “Bound Angel,” P·P·O·W, New York, NY
- 2022 “Memento Mori,” Pamela Salisbury Gallery, Hudson, NY
- 2022 “Portia Munson: Flood,” The Newmark Gallery at Art Omi, Ghent, NY
- 2021 “Memento Mori Mandalas,” Olana State Historic Site, Hudson, New York
- 2019 “Pink Projects,” Art Production Fund, Rockefeller Center, New York, New York
- 2018 “Her World/Her Room”, Bedford Gallery, Walnut Creek, California
- 2018 “Flood,” Disjecta, Portland, Oregon
- 2017 “The Garden,” PPOW Gallery, New York
- 2015 “Dear Mother Nature,” Mills Gallery, Central College, Pella, Iowa
- 2015 “Botanicals Below Bryant Park,” MTA Bryant Park Station, New York
- 2013 “Reflecting Pool,” PPOW Gallery, New York
- 2011 “Color Forms,” Mass MoCa, North Adams, Mass.
- 2010 “Portia Munson,” Liebowitz Gallery, Bard College at Simon's Rock, Great Barrington, Mass.
- 2007 “Green,” PPOW Gallery, New York
- 2005 “Flower Mandalas,” PPOW Gallery, New York
- 2001 “Green Piece: Lawn,” School House Center, Silas-Kenyon Gallery, Provincetown, Mass.
- 1996 “The Garden,” Yoshii Gallery, New York
- 1994 “Portia Munson,” Yoshii Gallery, New York
- 1994 “Bad Girls,” New Museum, New York
