= Art Omi =

Arts organization in Ghent, New York state

Coordinates: 42°19′52″N 73°40′21″W

Art Omi, formerly Omi International Arts Center, is a non-profit international arts organization located in Columbia County in Ghent, New York. The organization provides residencies for writers, artists, architects, musicians, dancers and choreographers.

Ledig House serves as Art Omi's home and central meeting place.

== History ==
The Omi International Arts Center was founded in 1992 by Francis J. Greenburger, a New York real estate developer and literary agent, who serves as chairman of Art Omi, Inc., the residency's parent foundation; Sandi Slone, an artist; artist John Cross, an artist; and others. The organization takes its name from Omi, a hamlet in the Hudson River Valley two and a half hours from New York City.

== Premises ==
Art Omi is located in Columbia County in Ghent, New York. It is home to the Sculpture & Architecture Park, (previously the Fields Sculpture Park), which is open to the public throughout the year, features over 70 permanent and temporary exhibitions. The Sculpture & Architecture Park occupies approximately 120 acres of Art Omi's campus.

The main compound is made up of three separate buildings with 18 guest rooms, three conference rooms, a library and communal spaces. Ledig House (named for the late German publisher H.M. Ledig-Rowohlt), a converted 1830 farmhouse, serves as Art Omi's home and central meeting place. The principal work space consists of a two-story converted barn and several satellite sheds. The Charles B. Benenson Visitors Center & Gallery opened to the public in 2008.

== Exhibitions ==
Art Omi has three types of exhibitions: Architecture, Art, and Sculpture.

Currently or previously exhibited architectural projects include Beom Jun Kim, Felix Heisel, Jon Lott / Para Project, Wendy Evans Joseph, Caroline O’Donnell + Martin Miller, Jenny Sabin, Alice Aycock, Skyline Adrift, and Oliver Kruse.

Art projects at Art Omi span from emerging, contemporary, to mid-career. Artists such as Niles Harris, Dion “TYGAPAW” McKenzie, Portia Munson, Jeffrey Gibson, David Shrigley, Tschabalala Self, Katherine Bernhardt, Tim Youd, Elizabeth Murray, and Stanley Whitney.

Sculpture works featured by Pippa Garner, Riley Hooker, Alicja Kwade, Olaf Breuning, Chemi Rosado-Seijo, Dan Colen, Brian Tolle, Atelier Van Lieshout, Arlene Shechet, Tony Tasset, and Nari Ward.

== Residencies, Education Programs, and other activities ==
Art Omi offers five residency programs: Art Omi: Architecture; Art Omi: Artists; Art Omi: Dance; Art Omi: Music; and Art Omi: Writers.

As Part of Art Omi's: Artists residency program, there is a Critics/Curators-in-Residence awarded stay each year. Previous Critics/Curators-in-Residence include Monika Fabijanska, Jonatan Habib Engqvist, Jessica Lynne, Ugochukwu-Smooth C. Nzewi, Martha Schwendener, Manuel Becerra and Omar Lopez Chahoud.

The non-profit also has a number of educational programs. These include a Winter Art Camp, Spring Art Camp, Saturday Children's Workshops, Camp Omi, Artgarten, and more.

Art Omi invites gallerists, critics, agents, publishers, curators and collectors to give talks and presentations. Their visits also benefit residents by providing them with exposure and access to the New York cultural scene. Omi regularly holds exhibitions, readings, concerts and dance performances to which the public is invited.

Omi's facilities are available for rental for corporate retreats from December through March, when residency programs are not in session.

== Funding ==
Art Omi raises money primarily from philanthropic and corporate foundations and individual donors. Its major fundraising event is a New York City benefit held each spring.
