= Big Duck Ranch =

- U.S. National Register of Historic Places
- New York State Register of Historic Places
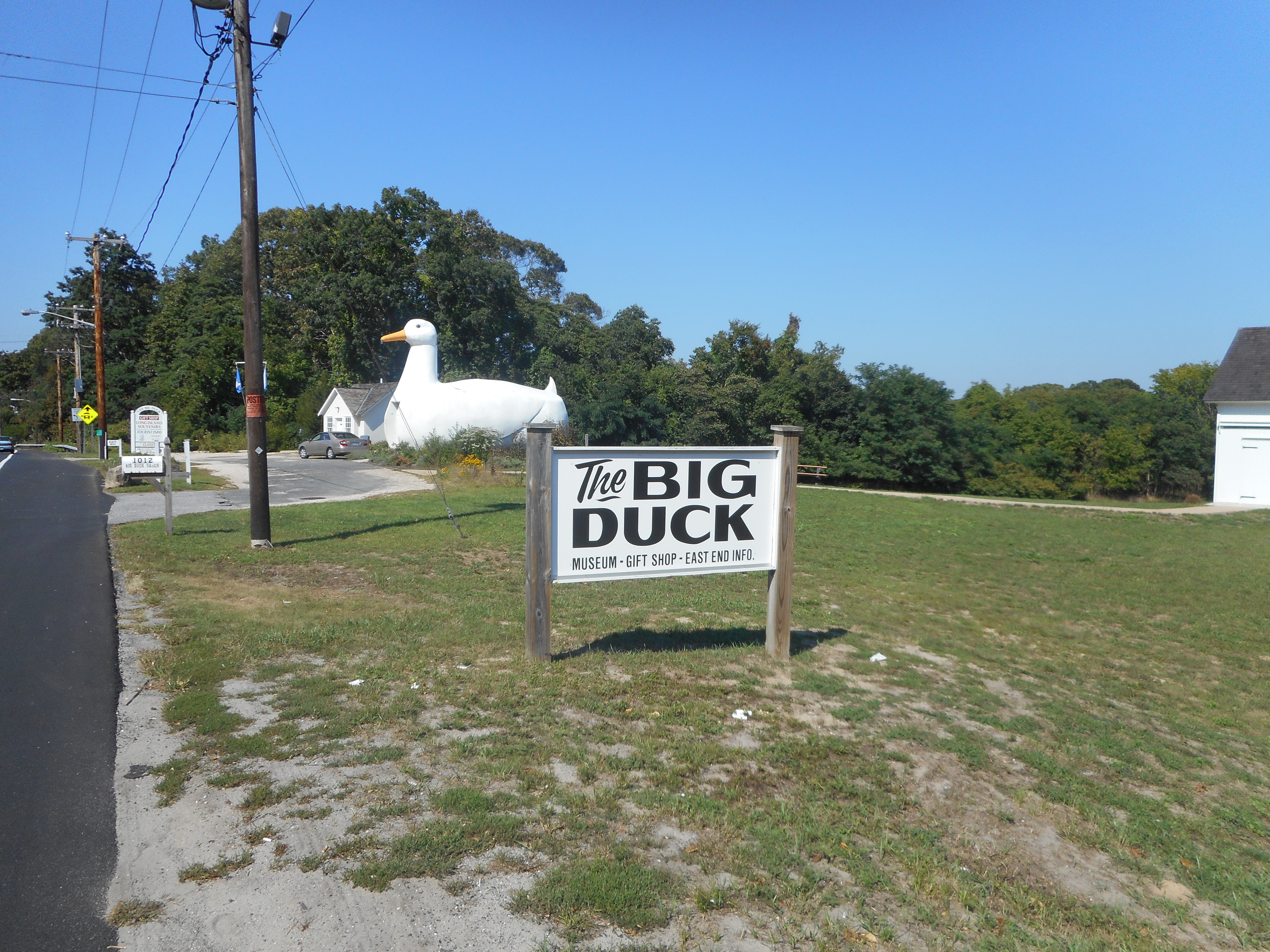
- The Big Duck Ranch, and its namesake duck

- Location within New York Location within the United States
- Location: 1012 NY 24; Flanders, New York
- Coordinates: 40°54′26″N 72°37′21″W
- Area: 11.3 acres (4.6 ha)
- Built: 1937
- Architect: Maurer, Martin
- NRHP reference No.: 08000866

Significant dates
- Added to NRHP: September 12, 2008
- Designated NYSRHP: July 25, 2008

Big Duck Ranch, also known as the Maurer Duck Farm, is a ranch located in Flanders, in Suffolk County, on Long Island, in New York, United States.

== Description ==
It operated as a duck ranch and retail store that sold duck products from 1936 to 1984.

It was added to the National Register of Historic Places and the New York State Register of Historic Places in 2008, as part of plans to build a heritage park, picnic area, museum, and rest stop. The Big Duck Ranch hosts various events, such as historic car shows, and is open year-round. The duck itself is not open to the public year-round.

== See also ==
- Big Duck
- James Benjamin Homestead
