= Francis J. Greenburger =

American businessman and writer

- Born: February 13, 1949 (age 77)
- Occupation: Real Estate Developer
- Spouse(s): Judy Greenburger (deceased); Isabelle Autones
- Children: 5
- Parent(s): Ingrid Gruttenfien Greenburger; Sanford J. Greenburger

Francis J. Greenburger (born February 13, 1949) is an American real estate developer, literary agent, author, philanthropist and the founder of Time Equities, Art Omi and The Greenburger Center for Social and Criminal Justice.

== Biography ==
Greenburger grew up in Forest Hills, Queens, New York City, New York. His mother, Ingrid (née Gruttenfien), was an ethnic German immigrant and author. His father was the literary agent Sanford Greenburger who founded the Sanford J. Greenburger Literary Agency His father was a first-generation American and the son of Hungarian immigrants whose literary agency was like a salon which attracted an eclectic expatriate clientele, a milieu in which the young Francis found himself ensconced. He has one brother, Andre. He attended Stuyvesant High School but dropped out in order to pursue dual careers in the book business (eventually upon his father's death taking over the elder Greenburger's agency) and real estate. Summarily attending Washington Irving High School at night, he went on to get his GED and then an undergraduate degree from Baruch College in public administration.

Greenburger went on to earn the moniker "the co-op king of New York" for his specialty of converting prewar apartment buildings into occupant-owned residences, which offered tenants the ability to become owners and create new wealth.

His literary agency, which still carries his father's name, has at different times represented, among other authors, Dan Brown, James Patterson, Nicholas Sparks, Nelson DeMille and George Bach.

In 1992 Greenburger founded the art center and residency program, Art Omi in Ghent, New York.

Today he is the CEO of the real estate firm he brought into being, Time Equities, Inc. which is set to open the billion dollar, 64 story mixed-use residential and commercial building 50 West Street in lower Manhattan adjacent to the Brooklyn Battery Tunnel. In addition, Time Equities, in a joint venture with JK Equities, has purchased a vacant parcel on South Michigan Avenue in Chicago with the intention of erecting a 73-story residential tower 1000 South Michigan designed by the German born American starchitect, Helmut Jahn (as is 50 West).

In 2016 BenBella Books published his autobiography Risk Game: Self-Portrait of an Entrepreneur which he co-authored with Rebecca Paley.

== Personal life ==
Greenburger has been married twice. His first wife was Judy Greenburger. They had one son, Alexander (born 1988), who drowned in an accident in 1990; adopted a son, newborn Morgan, in 1993; and later had another son, Noah (born 1995). They later separated and Judy died in 1999. Greenburger is remarried to French born architect Isabelle Autones; they have two daughters.
