= Manuel Becerra Salazar =

Mexican poet

Manuel Becerra
- Born: October 8, 1983 (age 42); Mexico City, Mexico
- Occupations: Poet; Writer; Teacher
- Children: 1
- Writing career
- Language: Spanish (Poems)
- Genre: Poetry
- Notable work: Instrucciones para matar un caballo

Manuel Becerra (born October 8, 1983, Mexico City, Mexico) is a Mexican poet. He is the author of seven books of poetry, including his award-winning "Los trabajos de la Luz no usada" and Canciones para adolescentes fumando en un claro del bosque. He has won six other national poetry prizes for his work. His work appears in three anthologies. He has worked as a translator and teaches creative writing for several foundations and has taught for the Secretary of Culture in Mexico. In 2019, the Emily Dickinson museum selected one of his poems translated in English to be installed in the streets of Amherst, Massachusetts for their project called The Art of Rain Poetry. He has been a poet in residency in the Omi Art Center in New York, the University of Stockton in New Jersey, and the International Writing Program at the University of Iowa. His poetry has been translated into Italian, English, and French. Becerra has just been awarded the Sistema Nacional de Creadores de Arte grant in Mexico.

== Published works ==
=== Books ===
- Cantata Castrati, (Editorial Colibrí, 2004)
- Los alumbrados, (Estado de México, 2008)
- Canciones para adolescentes fumando en un claro del bosque, (Universidad Autónoma de Zacatecas, México, 2011)
- Instrucciones para matar un caballo, (Conaculta/FONCA, México, 2013)
- Fábula y Odisea, (Mantis editores, 2020)
- Los trabajos de la Luz no usada, (FOEM, 2021)
- La escritura de los animales distintos, (Dogma, 2024)
- Estética de los objetos aislados, (Próximo a publicarse)

=== Anthologies ===
- El Lejano Oriente en la poesía mexicana, (Vaso Roto Ediciones/ Conaculta)
- Otras voces nos agitan, (Capítulo Siete Ediciones, Ciudad de México, 2019)
- The Americas Poetry Festival of New York, (Arte Poetica Press, NY, 2017)

== Awards ==
Year	Award
2024	Premio Internacional de Poesía Jaime Sabines
2020	Certamen Nacional de Literatura Laura Méndez de Cuenca
2019	Premio Nacional de Poesía Alonso Vidal
2016	Premio Nacional de Poesía Ciudad del Carmen
2014	Premio Nacional de Poesía Enriqueta Ochoa
2013	Premio Nacional de Poesía José Francisco Conde
2010	Premio Nacional de Poesía Ramón López Velarde
2008	Premio Nacional de Poesía Enrique González Rojo
