= Caroline O'Donnell =

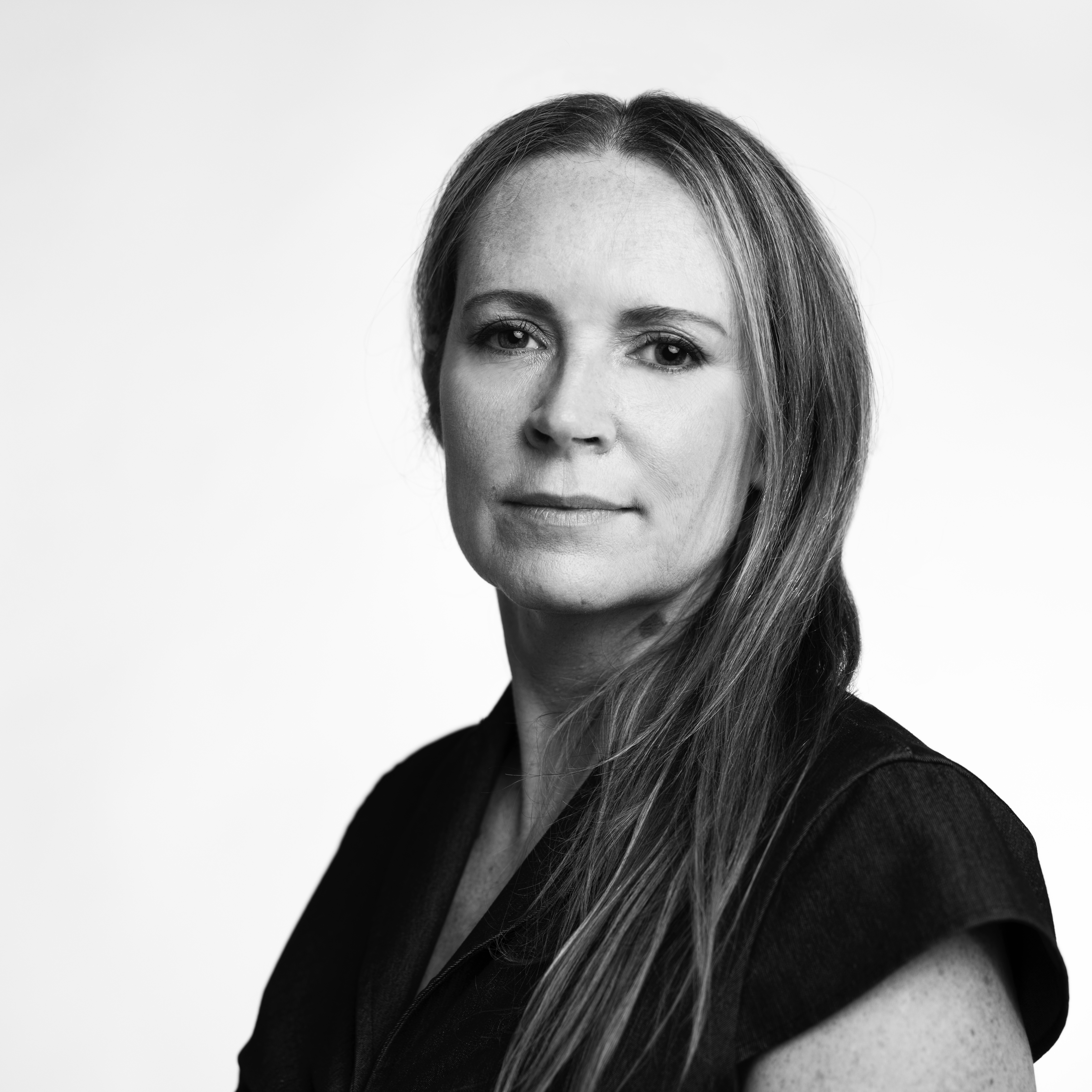

Caroline O'Donnell is an architect, writer, and educator. She is the founder and sole-proprietor of the firm CODA (Caroline O'Donnell Architecture), based in Ithaca, NY, USA. CODA won the PS1 MoMA Young Architects Program in 2013 and built "Party Wall" at PS1 in Long Island City, New York. O’Donnell is the Edgar A. Tafel Professor of Architecture, and Chair of Department of Architecture at Cornell University. She has previously taught at the Irwin S. Chanin School of Architecture at the Cooper Union, and at Harvard GSD.

== Life and career ==
O'Donnell was born and raised in Athlone, Ireland and later in Derry, N.Ireland. She received her B.Arch with a specialization in Bioclimatics from the Manchester School of Architecture in England in 2000, winning the Heywood Medal for the most outstanding final year student. She worked with Nettleton Willoughby Williams in Sydney, Australia, from 1997 to 1998 and with KCAP (Kees Christiaanse Architects and Planners) in Rotterdam, the Netherlands, from 2000 to 2004.

She received Master of Architecture from Princeton School of Architecture in 2006, sponsored by the Arts Council of Ireland and the Fonds BKVB in the Netherlands, where she won the Susan K. Underwood Prize awarded to the graduating M.Arch student demonstrating exceptional ability and talent throughout their studies in Architectural Design. She subsequently worked at Eisenman Architects until 2008, having a lead design role in the Hamburg Library competition, Pompei Santuario Train Station, and others.

O’Donnell moved to Ithaca to teach at Cornell University in 2008 and it is there that she founded CODA, an architectural practice that promotes sustainability through a close relationship between architecture and environment.

In 2010, she received second prize in Europan 10 competition with Urban Punc., a proposal for urban regeneration for the city of Leisnig, Germany (with Troy Schaum) and in 2012, she won first prize in the Europan 11 competition, with the project Counterspace, designed for a site in the Dublin Docklands.

In 2013, CODA won the MoMA PS 1 Young Architects Program with the project 'Party Wall' which used the by-product from skateboard manufacturing and leftover steel as well as the Royal Hibernian Academy’s Arthur Gibney Award for Work with Outstanding Architectural Content.

In 2016, CODA’s project ‘Urchin,’ a pavilion made entirely from plastic chairs, was selected to be built for the Cornell Council of the Arts Biennial.

Since 2014, O’Donnell has had a collaboration with Martin Miller, under the banner of OMG. They have collaborated on several projects, including Art Dock, a submission for the Helsinki Guggenheim Museum competition, Zimmer, a walking house and Rickshaw, for which they were finalists in the Street Architecture: Ideas City Pavilion Competition, Storefront for Art and Architecture/New Museum, New York. In 2017, OMG opened its first built work: a decomposing pavilion Primitive Hut at Art Omi, Ghent. In 2018, OMG opened a second pavilion, named Evitim: a pavilion made from the waste of Primitive Hut. In addition, O’Donnell heads the Ecological Action Lab (EAL) at Cornell, whose research projects experiment with nose-to-tail practices, novel materials, and the reimagining of the function of objects. Current projects include explorations into architecture and waste with potato starch, manure, sheet metal, and wood. Alongside OMG and EAL collaborations, O’Donnell continues to lead CODA with projects such as an inclusive addition to the Constance Saltonstall Foundation for the Arts, and housing at various scales in Ithaca, NY.

In 2017, O'Donnell was named one of the world's top 30 female architects by Azure Magazine.

== Books ==
O’Donnell’s first book Niche Tactics: Generative Relationships between Architecture and Site, was published in April 2015. Niche Tactics aligns architecture's relationship with site with its ecological analogue: the relationship between an organism and its environment. Niche Tactics was translated into Chinese by Luo Le and Maria Yue Ma, and published in 2021.

The book of short stories, "This is Not A Wall: Collected Short Stories on CODA's Party Wall at MoMA PS1", edited by Caroline O’Donnell and Steven Chodoriwsky, collects 75 short stories from a diverse range of participants.

In 2020, O’Donnell co-edited and co-wrote The Architecture of Waste: Design for a Circular Economy, published by Routledge (New York). This book includes contributions from Felix Heisel and Mariana Mogilevich, as well as several students from Cornell Architecture and Harvard GSD.

Werewolf: The Architecture of Lunacy, Shapeshifting, and Material Metamorphosis, co-written and co-edited with José Ibarra, was published by AR+D/ORO Publications in 2021. This book includes contributions from Martin Miller, Spyros Papapetros, Jesse Reiser, Kari Weil, Peter Eisenman, Cynthia Davidson, Jimenez Lai, and Greg Lynn. A Chinese translation of Werewolf is in progress.

O’Donnell has also contributed several books including chapters in D’Arcy Wentworth Thompson’s Generative Influences in Art, Design, and Architecture: From Forces to Forms, (edited by Ellen K. Levy, Bloomsbury Press, 2021); The Routledge Companion to Performativity in Design and Architecture: Using Time to Craft an Enduring, Resilient and Relevant Architecture, (edited by Mitra Kanaani, Routledge, 2020); Architecture and Ugliness: Anti-Aesthetics and the Ugly in Postmodern Architecture (edited by Wouter Van Acker and Thomas Mical, London: Bloomsbury, 2020); The Philosophy of Dumbness, (ed. Joseph Choma, ORO Editions, 2021); and Giraffes, Telegraphs and Hero of Alexandria, (S.Mueller and A. Quednau, Ruby Press, 2016).

== Journals ==
Together with Marc McQuade and Brian Tabolt, O’Donnell co-founded the journal Pidgin at Princeton in 2005.

From 2008 to 2017 she was the editor-in-chief of the Cornell Journal of Architecture, publishing issue 8: RE, issue 9: Mathematics: from the Ideal to the Uncertain, and issue 10: Spirits. O’Donnell has contributed essays to several journals including Log, Thresholds, The Cornell Journal of Architecture, Pidgin, and others.
