= Novelty architecture =

Type of architecture in which buildings have unusual or eccentric shapes

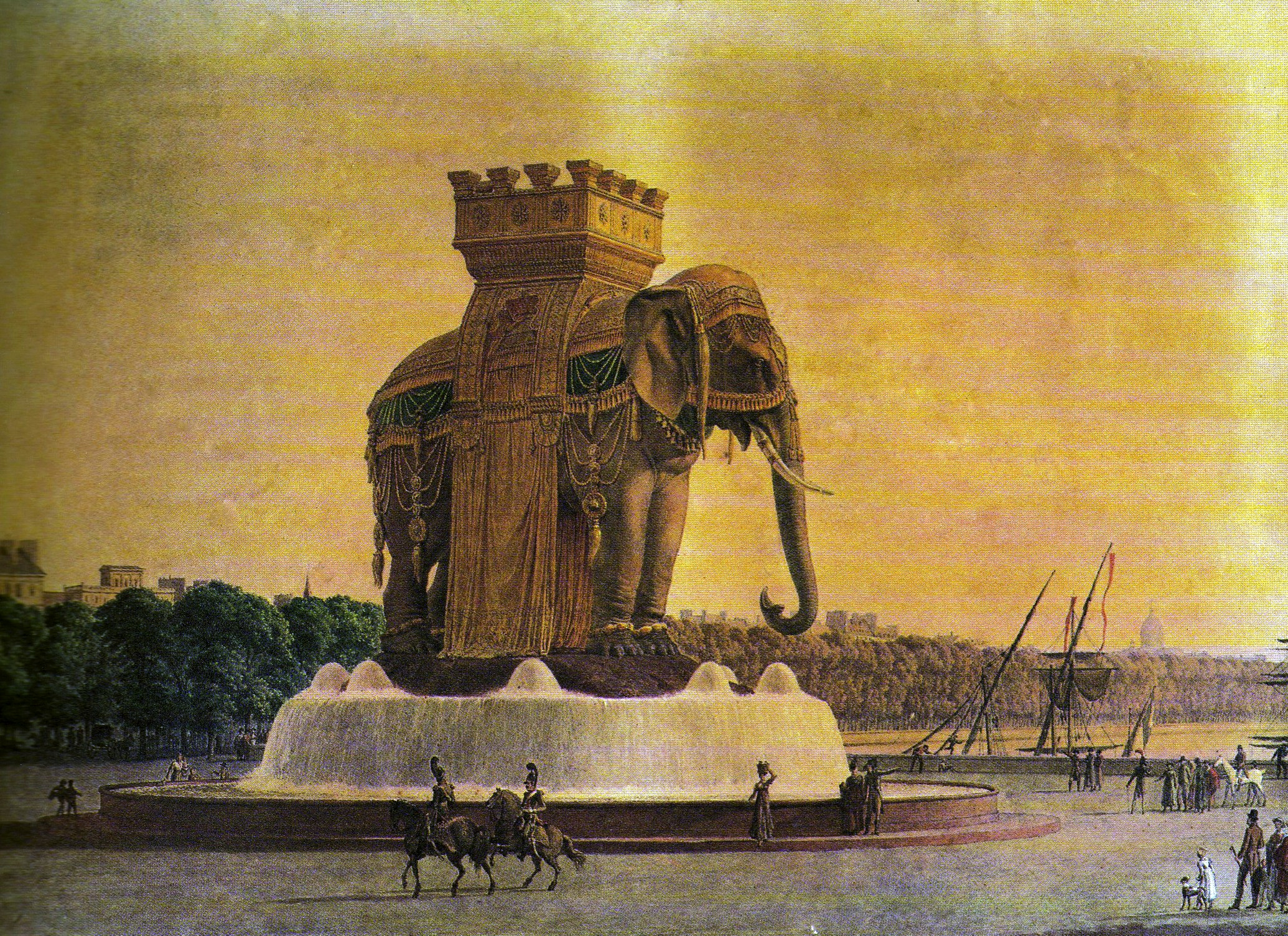
Elephant of the Bastille, 1813–1846 Paris

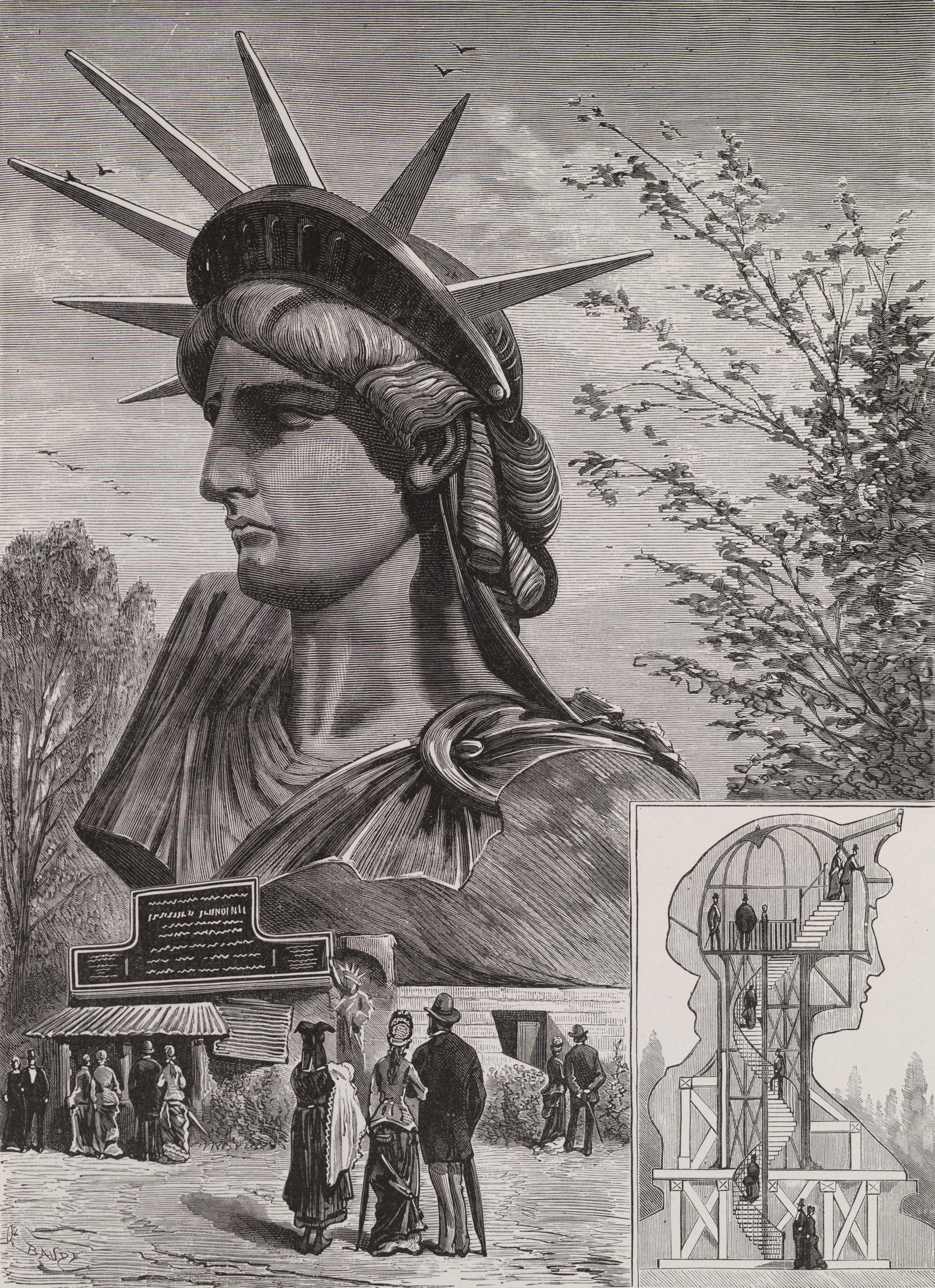
Engraving of design for the head of the Statue of Liberty (1879) in the Champ de Mars, Paris, including diagram showing plans for human access

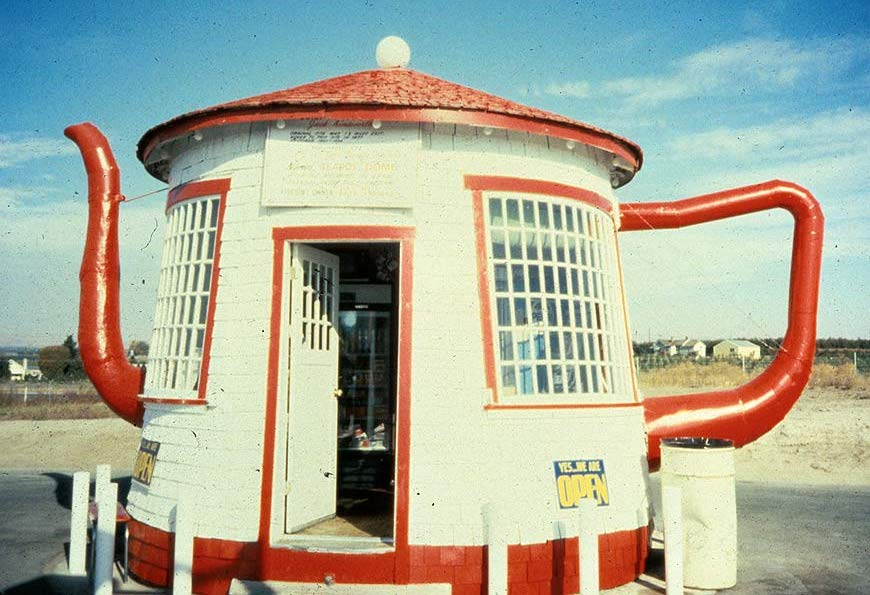
Teapot Dome Service Station in Zillah, Washington

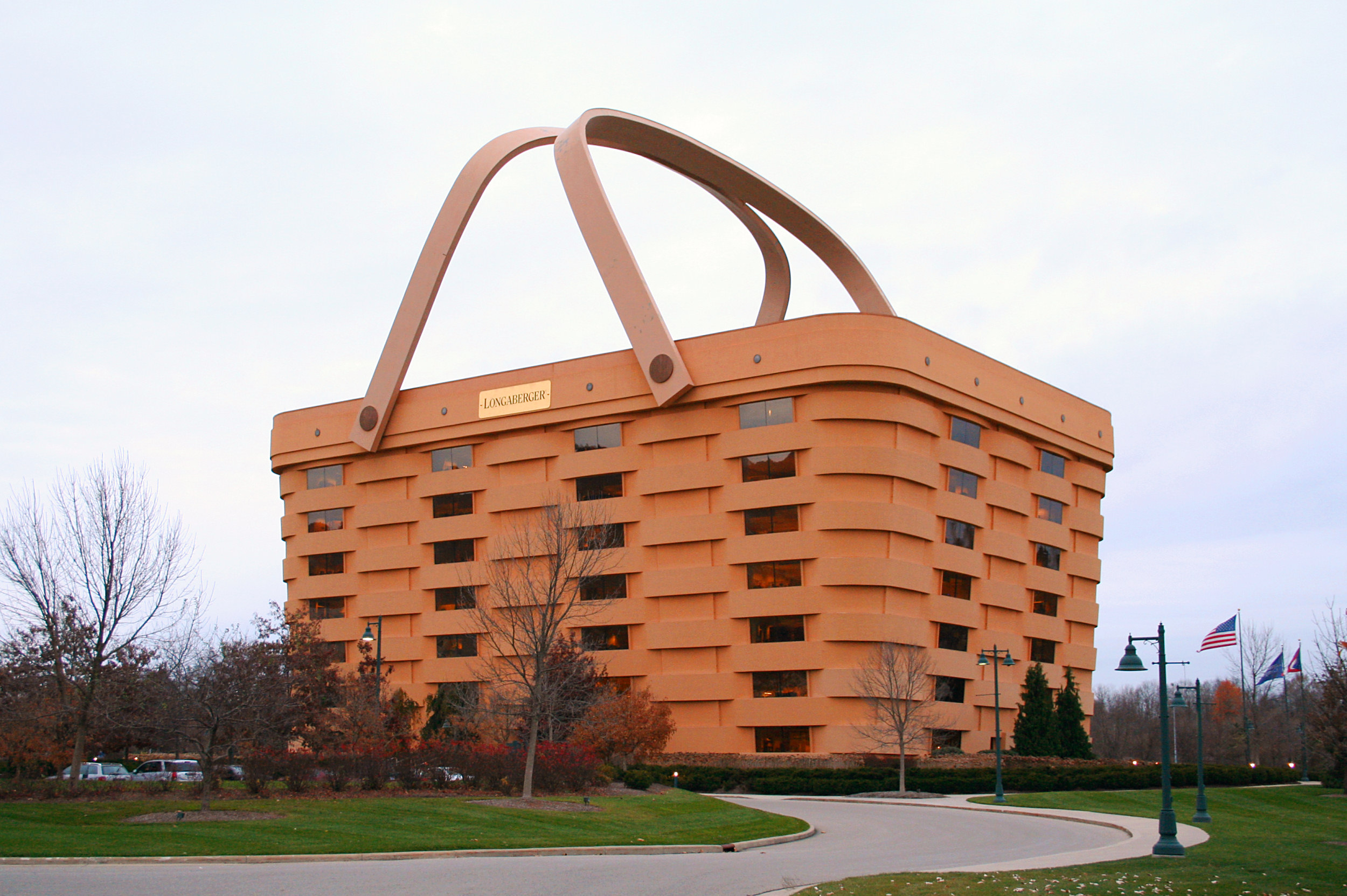
The Longaberger Company headquarters in Newark, Ohio

Novelty architecture, also called programmatic architecture or mimetic architecture, is a type of architecture in which buildings and other structures are given unusual shapes for purposes such as advertising or to copy other famous buildings. Their size and novelty means that they often serve as landmarks. They are distinct from architectural follies: novelty architecture refers to usable buildings in eccentric form, whereas follies are purely ornamental (albeit also often in eccentric form).

== Overview ==
Although earlier examples exist, such as the planned but never completed Parisian Elephant of the Bastille, the style generally became popular in the United States, and later to some other countries, as travel by automobile increased in the 1930s. New York City's Statue of Liberty is a statue that is part sculpture and part monument, which like many subsequent examples of novelty architecture, has an accessible interior and became a tourist attraction.

Constructing novelty architecture near to roads became one way of attracting motorists to a diner, coffee shop, or roadside attraction, so buildings were constructed in an unusual shape, especially the shape of the things sold there. "Mimic" architecture became a trend, and many roadside coffee shops were built in the shape of giant coffee pots; hot dog stands were built in the shape of giant hot dogs; and fruit stands were built in the shape of oranges or other fruit. Tail o' the Pup is a hot dog-shaped hot dog stand; Brown Derby is a derby-shaped restaurant; Bondurant's Pharmacy is a mortar-and-pestle pharmacy; the Big Apple Restaurant and the Big Duck are, respectively, a 10.7-metre (35 ft) tall apple and a poultry store shaped like a duck (now a gift shop). Montréal has the restaurant Gibeau Orange Julep built as a 12-metre high orange-coloured truncated sphere in 1966 (replacing its smaller sphere of 1945) and still operating today.

Novelty or programmatic (mimetic) architecture may take the form of objects not normally associated with buildings, such as characters, animals, people or household objects. Lucy the Elephant and The Longaberger Company's head office are examples. There may be an element of caricature or a cartoon associated with the architecture. Such giant animals, fruits and vegetables, or replicas of famous buildings often serve as attractions themselves. Some are simply unusual shapes or constructed of unusual materials.

Many examples of novelty architecture are designed to attract drive-by customers by taking the form of products sold inside. Others, such as casinos in Las Vegas and Macau, are based on famous landmarks from around the world.

== Categories ==
=== Buildings resembling objects or creatures ===
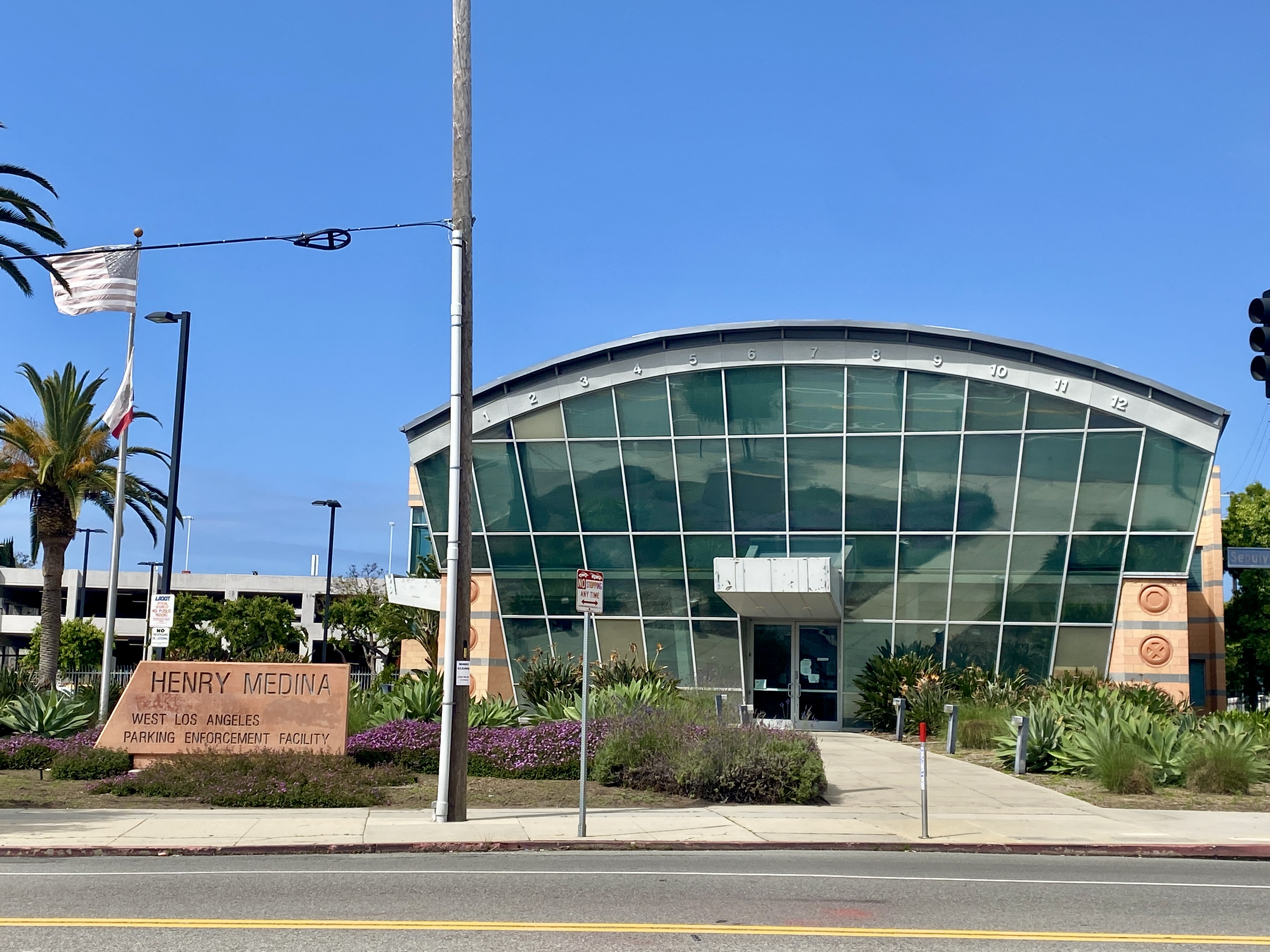
Mimetic architecture in California: Parking enforcement office building looks like a parking meter

Mimetic architecture, or buildings designed to imitate a giant object or creature, sometimes having to do with what is being sold or showcased inside.

Examples include the High-Heel Wedding Church in Taiwan, the Mr. Toilet House in South Korea, the Museum of Tea Culture in China, the National Fisheries Development Board building. the Chowdiah Memorial Hall auditorium in India, the Elephant Building in Thailand, and the Wolfartsweier Cat Kindergarten and the BMW Headquarters in Germany.

=== Buildings styled after famous landmarks ===
Novelty architecture in the form of famous landmarks has been built in China, Georgia, Japan and the United States, for instance. Such replica buildings are extensively used in casinos, hotels, shopping plazas, or amusement parks such as Disneyland where the apparent playfulness and whimsy are intended to add to their appeal. In some cases, such as Carhenge, the structure is an adaptation of a well-known building.

In China, the New South China Mall in Dongguan features a 25-metre (82 ft) replica of the Arc de Triomphe, another replica of Venice's St Mark's Campanile, a 2.1-kilometre (1.3 mi) canal with gondolas.

In Batumi on Georgia's Black Sea coast, new high-rise landmark buildings and the renovation of the Old Town have incorporated novelty buildings. Many of these constructions are novelty architecture, including the Sheraton Hotel, designed in the style of the Great Lighthouse at Alexandria, Egypt; the Alphabetic Tower (130 metres (430 ft) high), celebrating Georgian script and writing; Piazza, a mixed-used development in the form of an Italian piazza; and buildings designed in the style of the Leaning Tower of Pisa, the Acropolis, and an upside-down White House.

In Japan, there is the Huis Ten Bosch theme park near Nagasaki, which has replicas of Dutch landmarks like Huis ten Bosch and the Dom Tower of Utrecht.

In the US, a shopping plaza in Kansas City, Missouri, contains a half-sized replica of La Giralda in Sevilla. Casinos on the Las Vegas Strip in the form of novelty architecture include the pyramid-shaped Luxor Hotel and the New York-New York Hotel & Casino, a building designed to look like the New York City skyline; Paris Las Vegas whose front suggests the Paris Opera House and the Louvre; and Excalibur Hotel and Casino (1990), with its stylized façade of King Arthur's castle (Camelot). In Macau, The Venetian Macao, like its counterpart in Las Vegas, features a replica of St Mark's Campanile and other buildings in Venice.

=== Water towers and storage tanks ===
Water towers and storage tanks, often prominent features in a small town, are two types of buildings which have been shaped or decorated to look like everyday objects. There are many versions of these types of novelty architecture.

Water towers exist in many forms, among them peaches, coffee pots, and teapots; corn cobs, wine bottles, and sauce bottles; and fishing bobbers and strawberries.

Several breweries and other businesses have designed holding tanks in the shape of giant cans of beer or other containers.

=== Giant sculptures ===
Sculptures of ordinary items scaled to building size are another aspect of novelty architecture. Such sculptures appear at roadside parks and attractions or museums in Australia, Canada, Japan, New Zealand, the Philippines and the United States. They are likely to represent local animals, such as fish or other wildlife; local plants, such as apples or pineapples; well-known local people such as Paul Bunyan; food, such as the branded candy bars at the former Curtiss Candy Company; sporting or mechanical equipment such as giant bats, balls, or tires; musical instruments, such as guitars; clothing, such as giant boots; or popular creatures, such as dinosaurs.

In some instances, the giant sculpture provides a reference for the building to which it is connected. Examples are the giant baseball bat outside the Louisville Slugger Museum & Factory and the giant paper plane at Cleveland Hopkins International Airport.

=== Other styles ===
Architecture popular in the 1950s-1960s in southern California and in Florida featured sharp corners, tilted roofs, starburst designs, and fanciful shapes. This came to be known as Googie, Doo Wop, or populuxe architecture.

Long-established firms whose features are well-known could still qualify as novelty architecture; examples include McDonald's original golden-arches design and the self-referential design of the White Castle restaurants.

== Selected works ==
=== Around the world ===
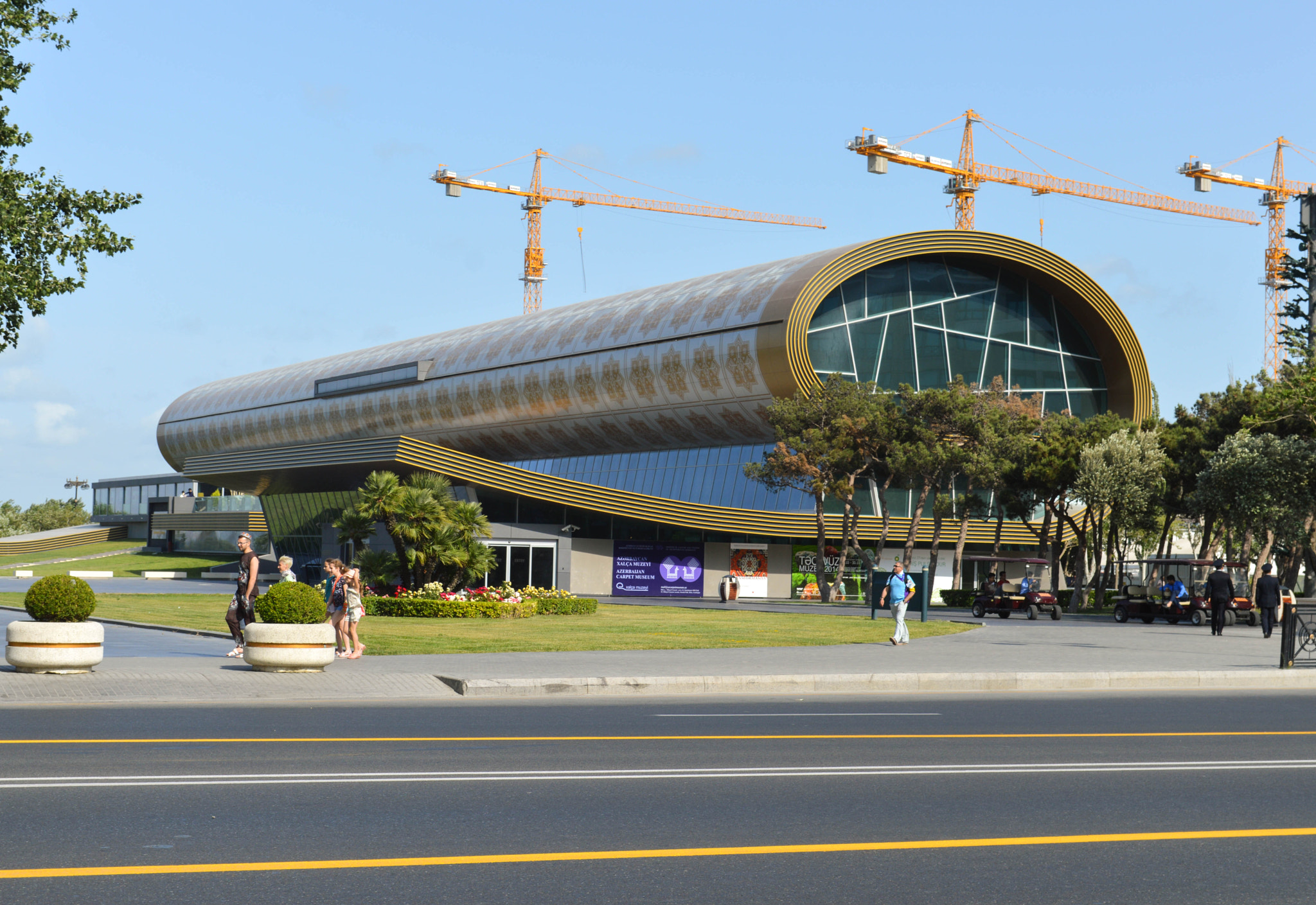
Azerbaijan Carpet Museum, Baku

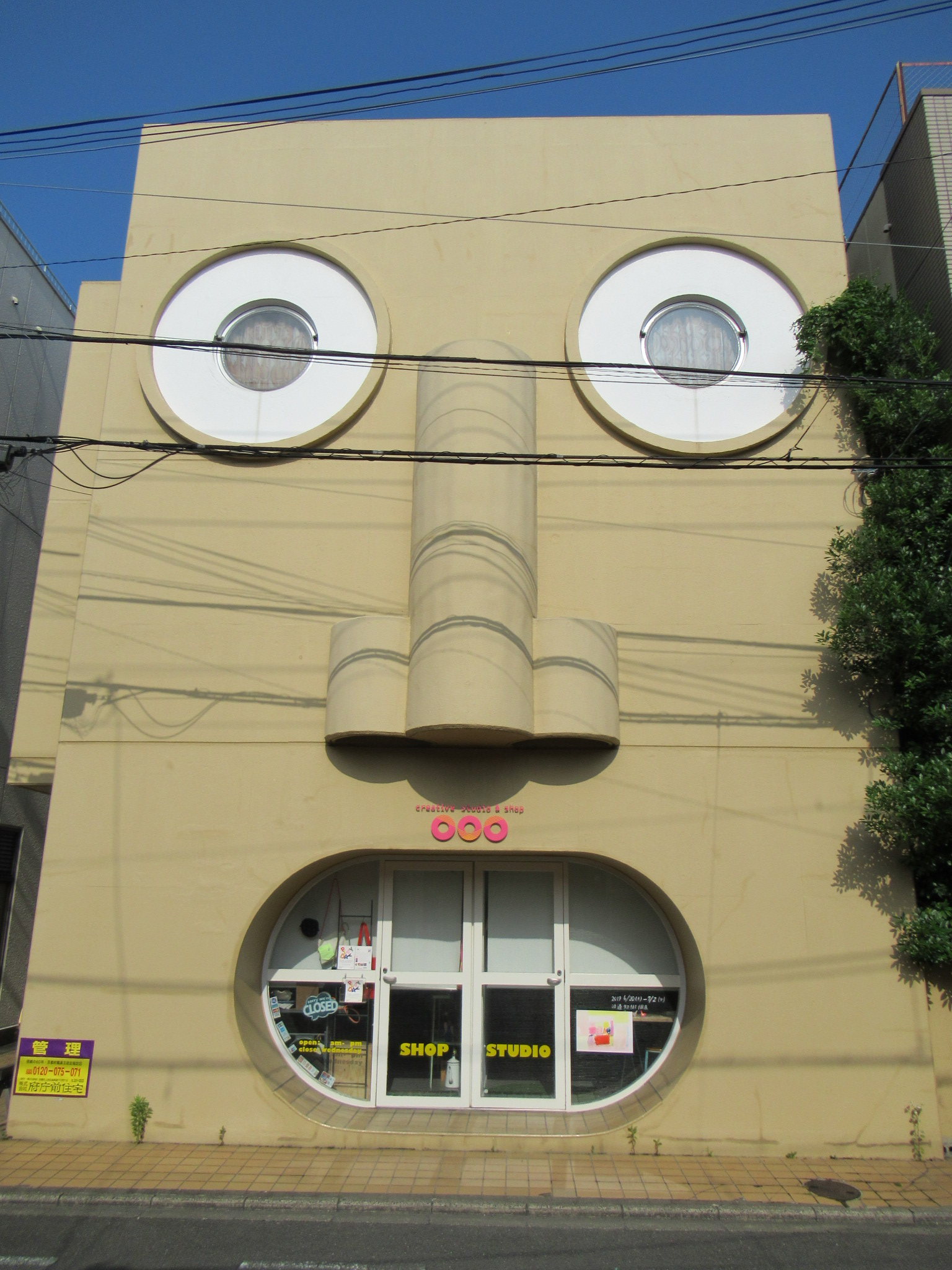
The Face House in Kyoto, Japan.

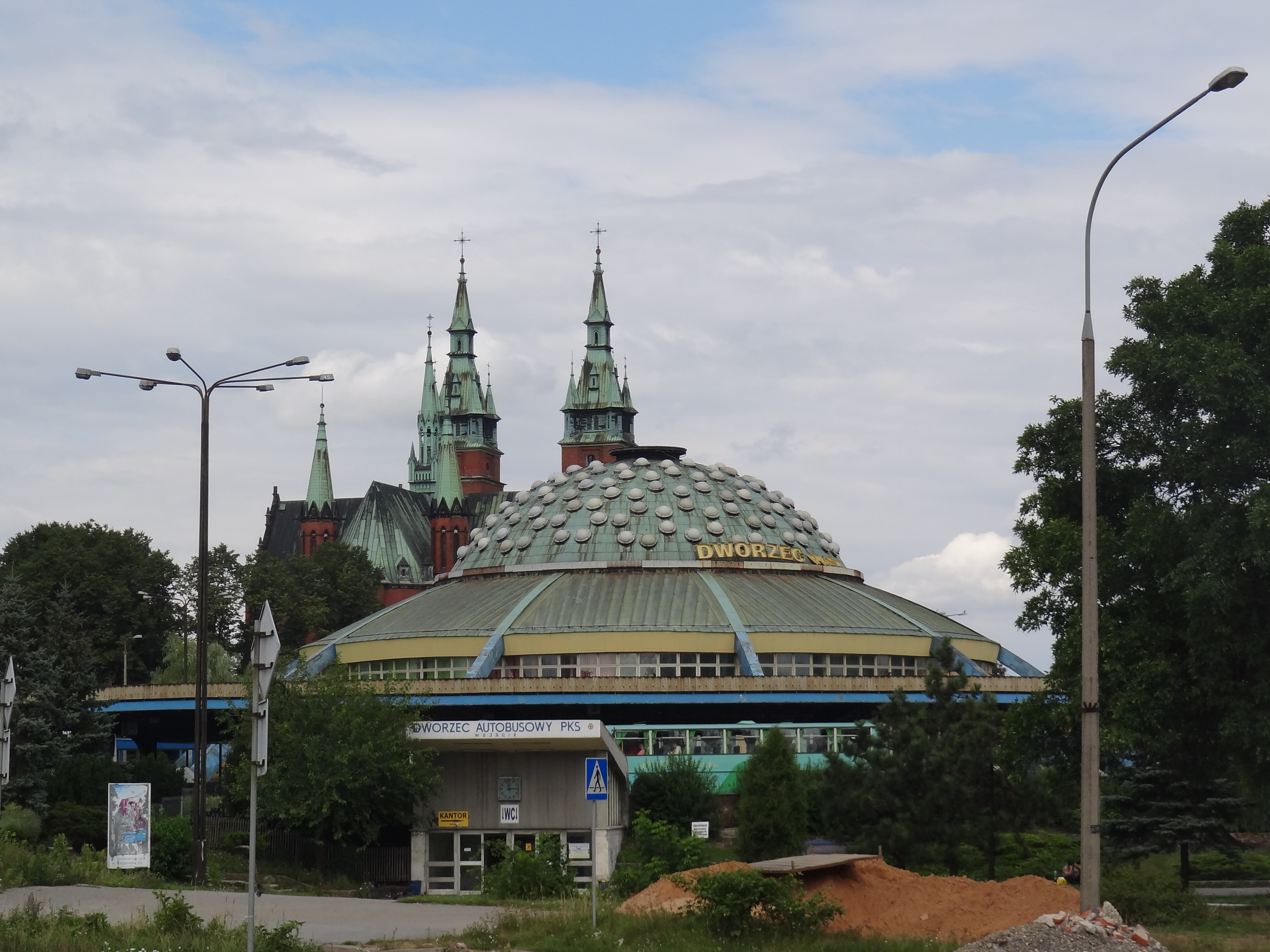
UFO-shaped bus station in Kielce, Poland (2012)

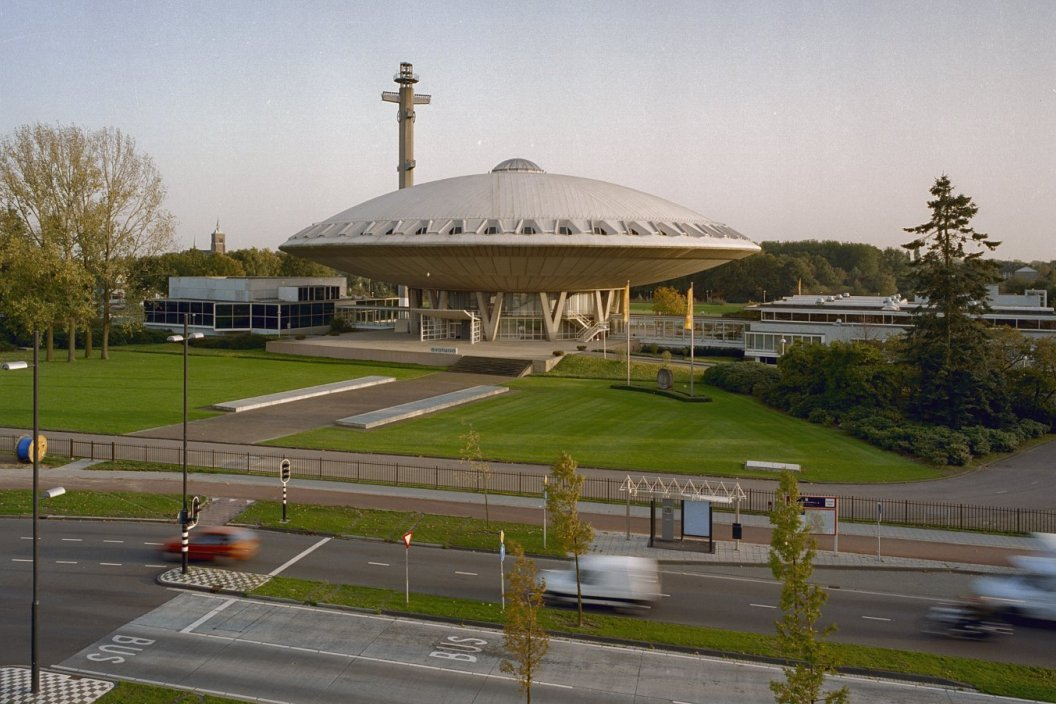
Evoluon in Eindhoven, Netherlands

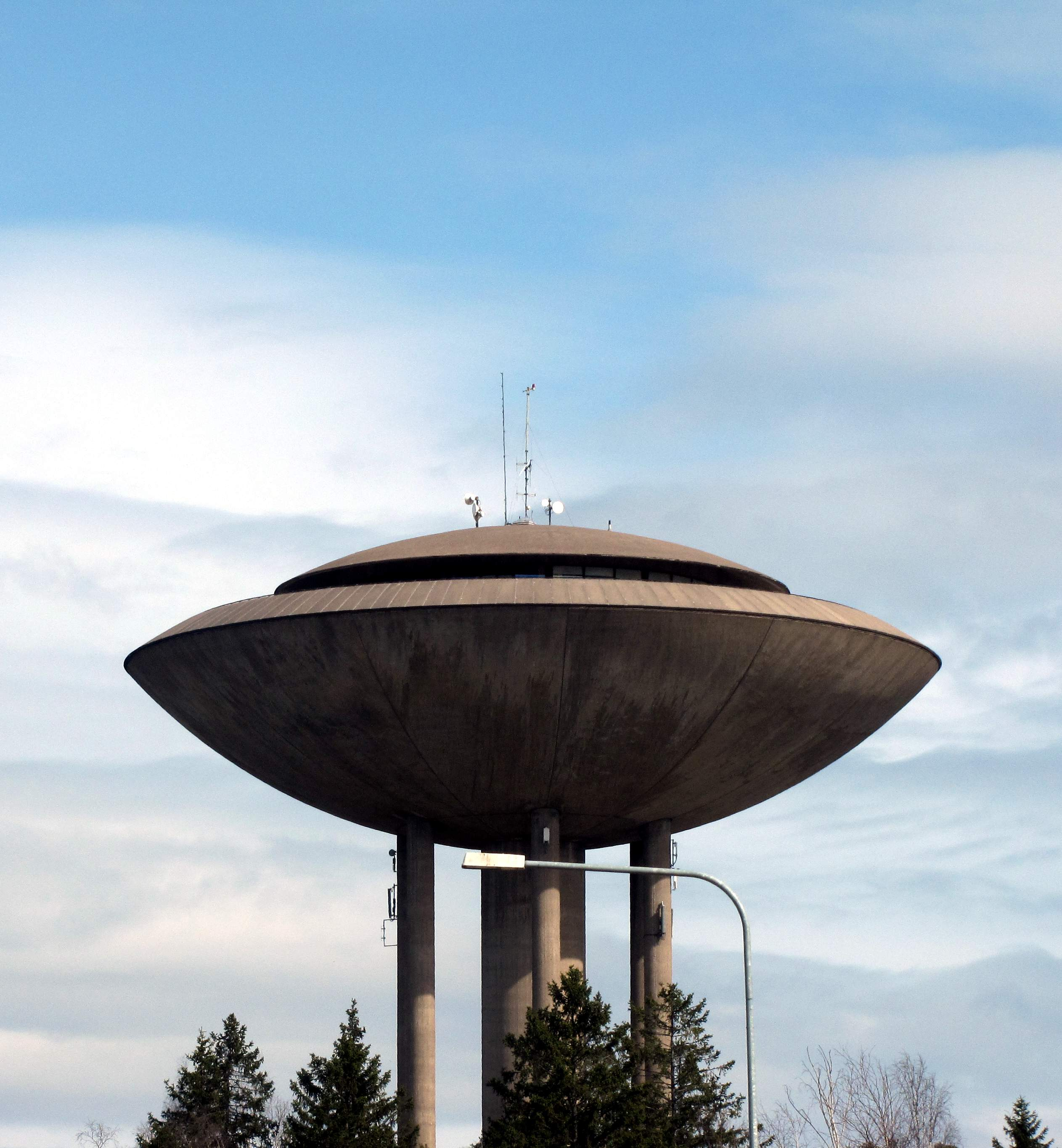
Haukilahti water tower in Espoo, Finland

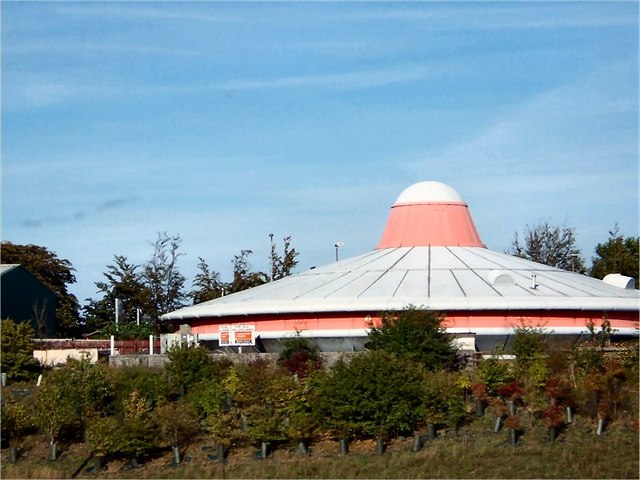
Megatron (building) in Alconbury, UK

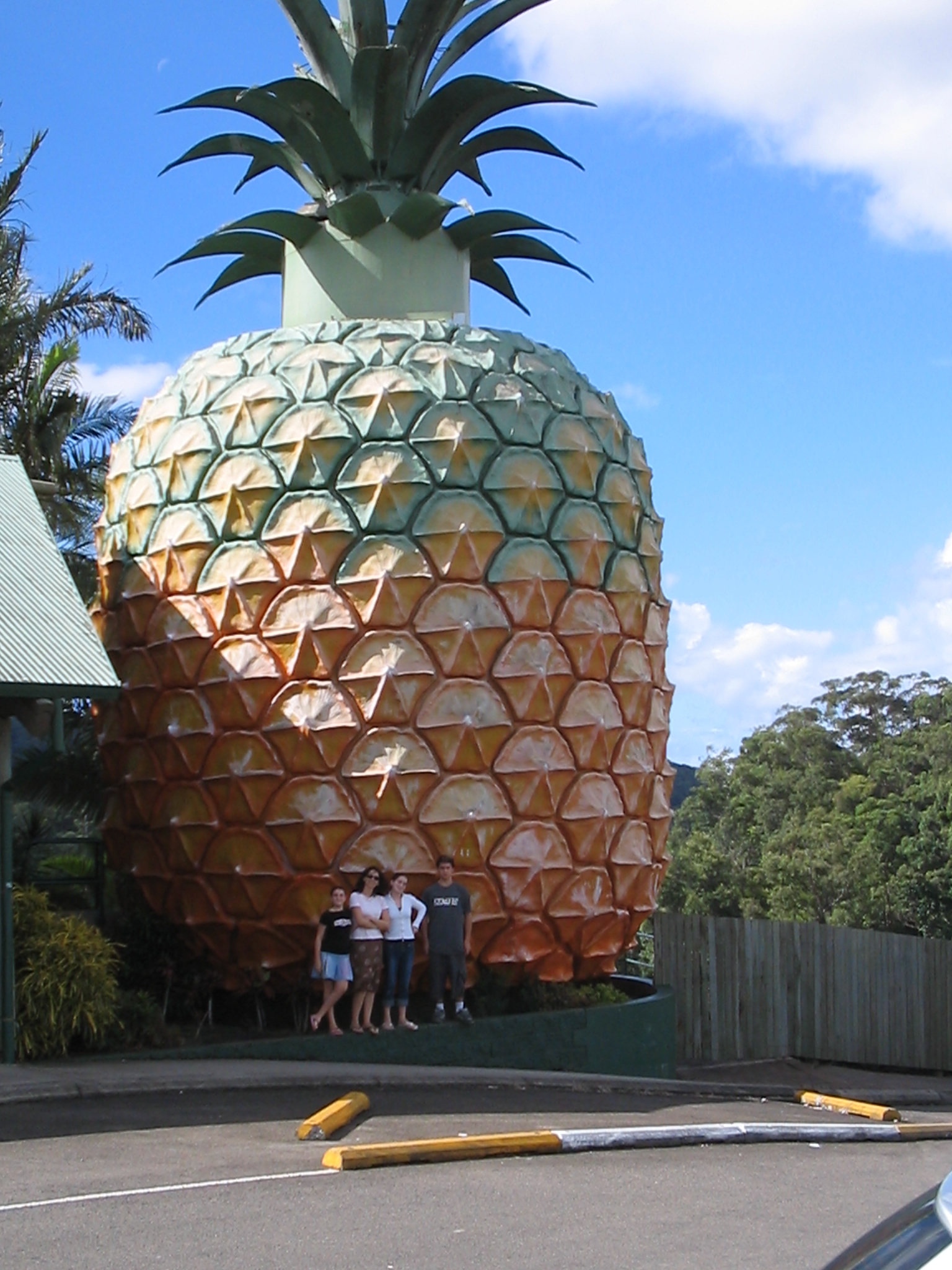
The Big Pineapple in Nambour, Australia

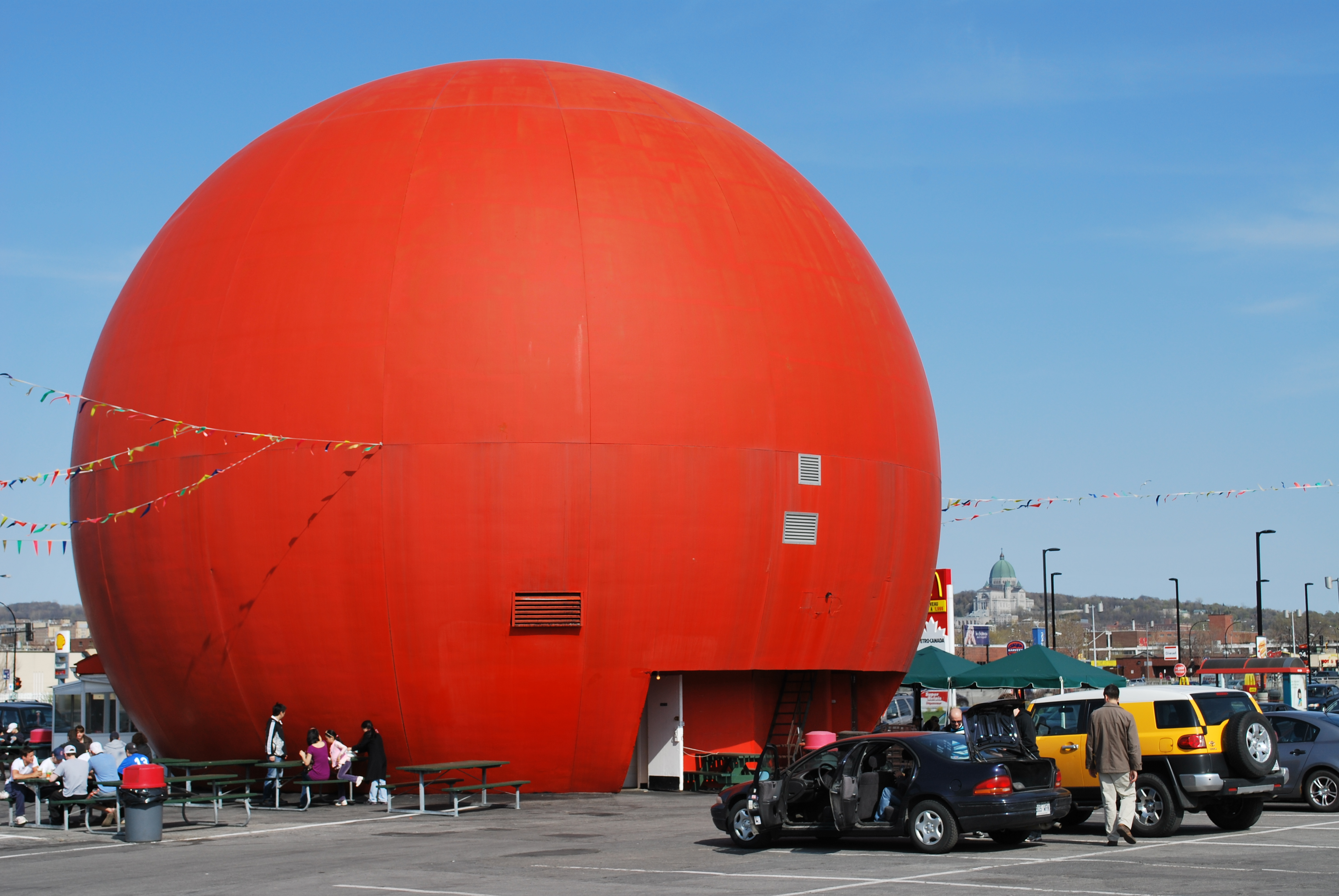
Gibeau Orange Julep in Montreal, Quebec, Canada

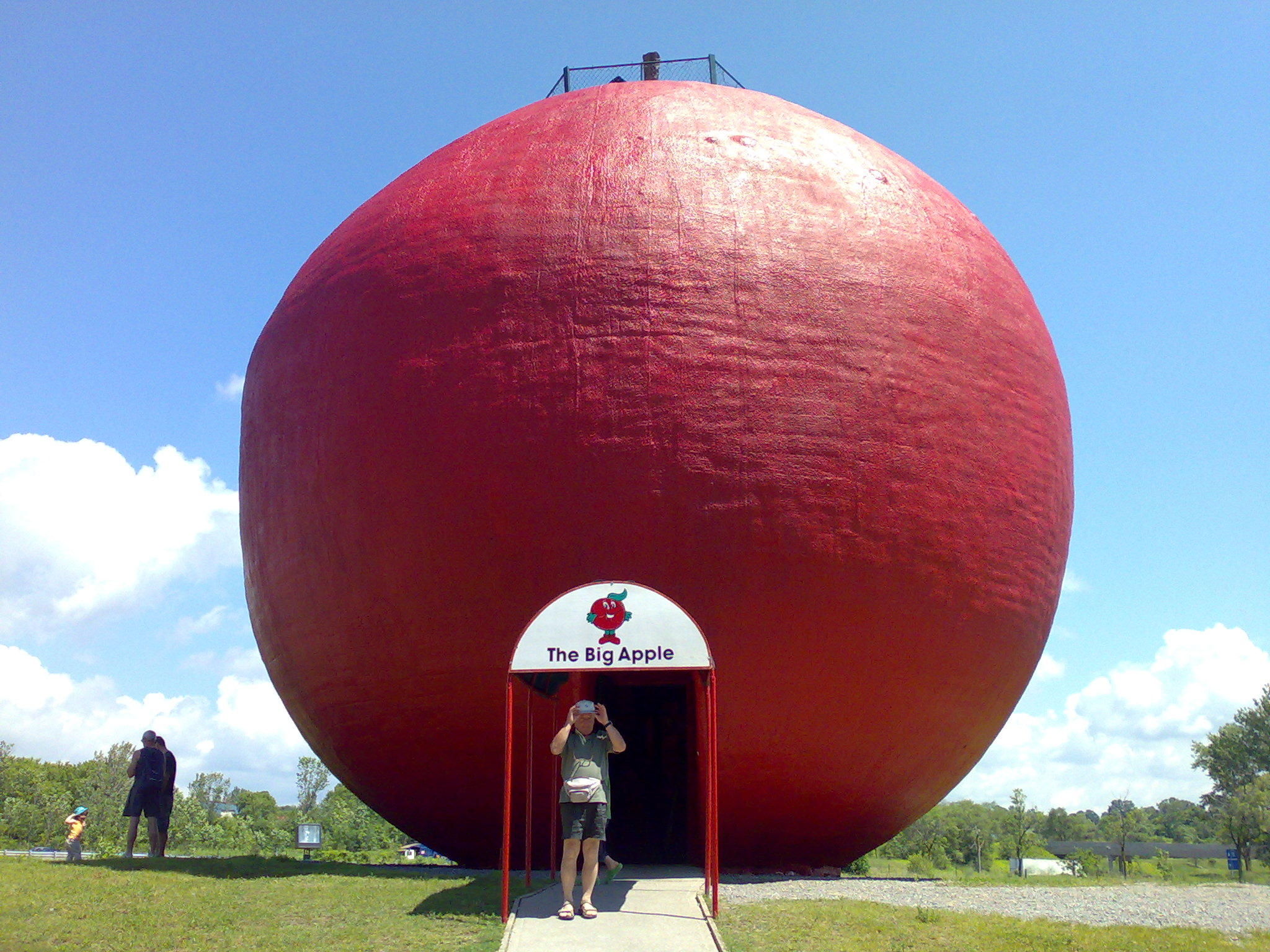
Big Apple (Colborne, Ontario), Canada

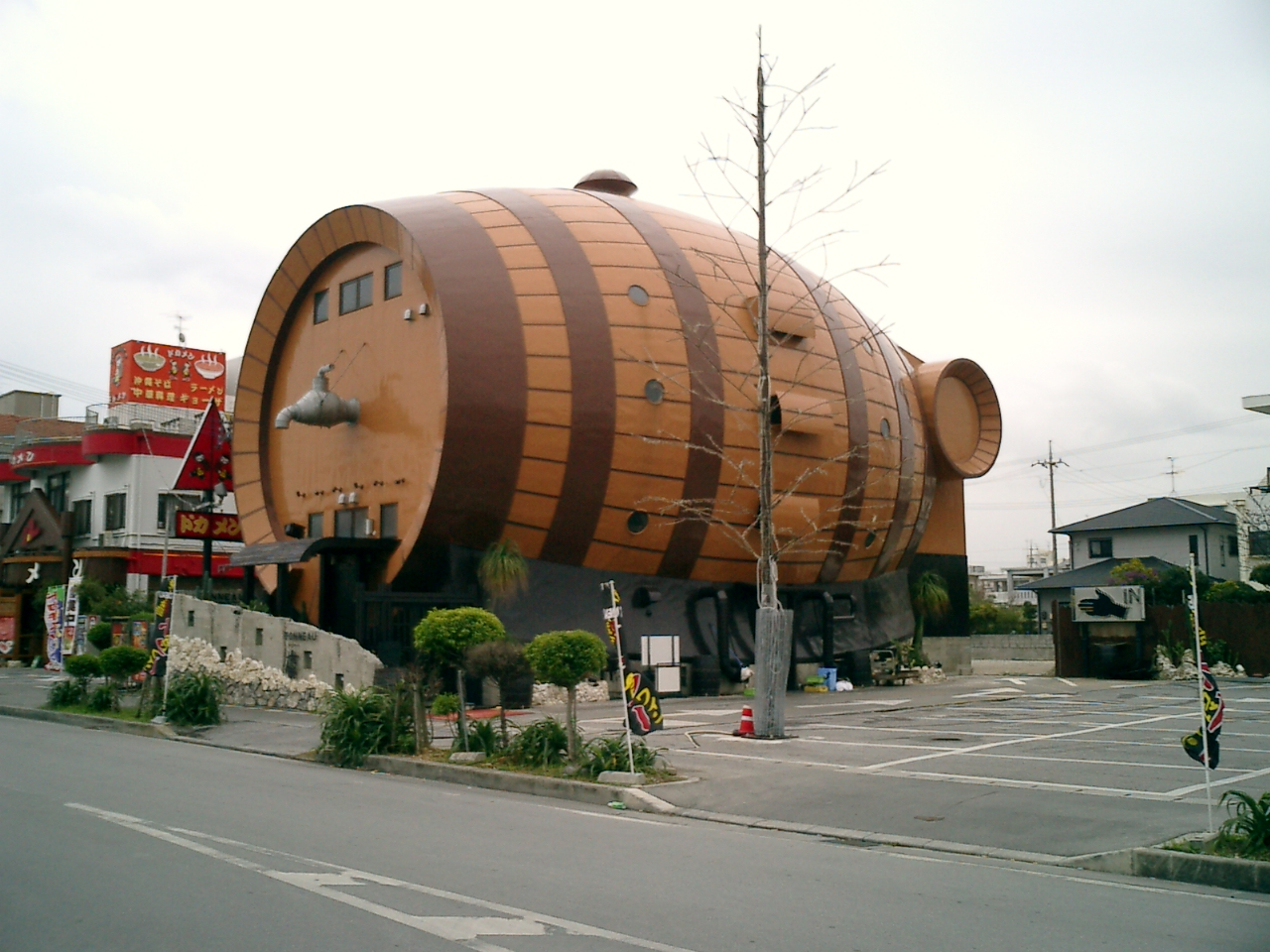
Large barrel-shaped bistro and bar in Okinawa City, Japan

The Pysanka or Painted Easter Egg Museum in Kolomyia, Ukraine

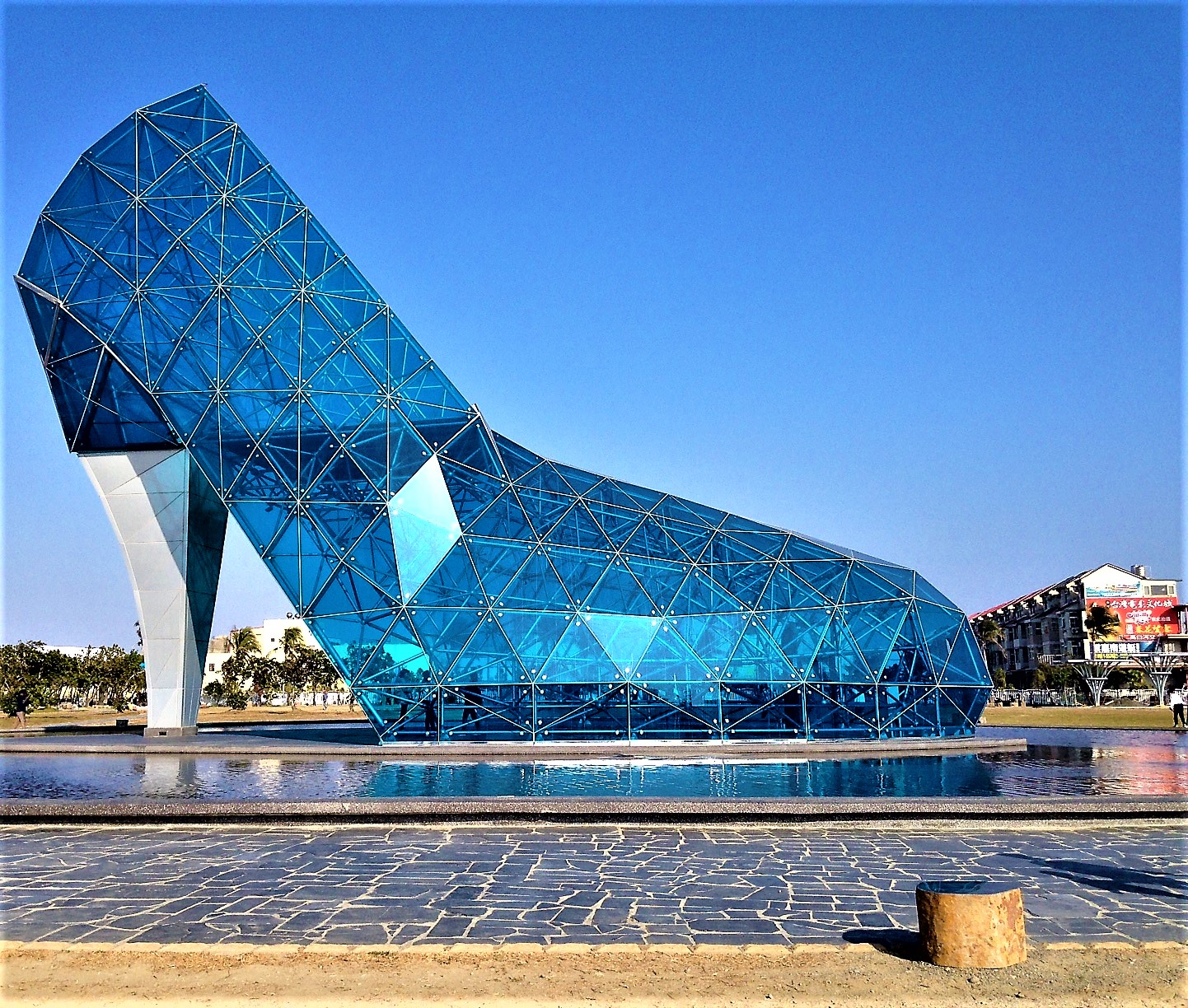
The High-Heel Wedding Church in Taiwan

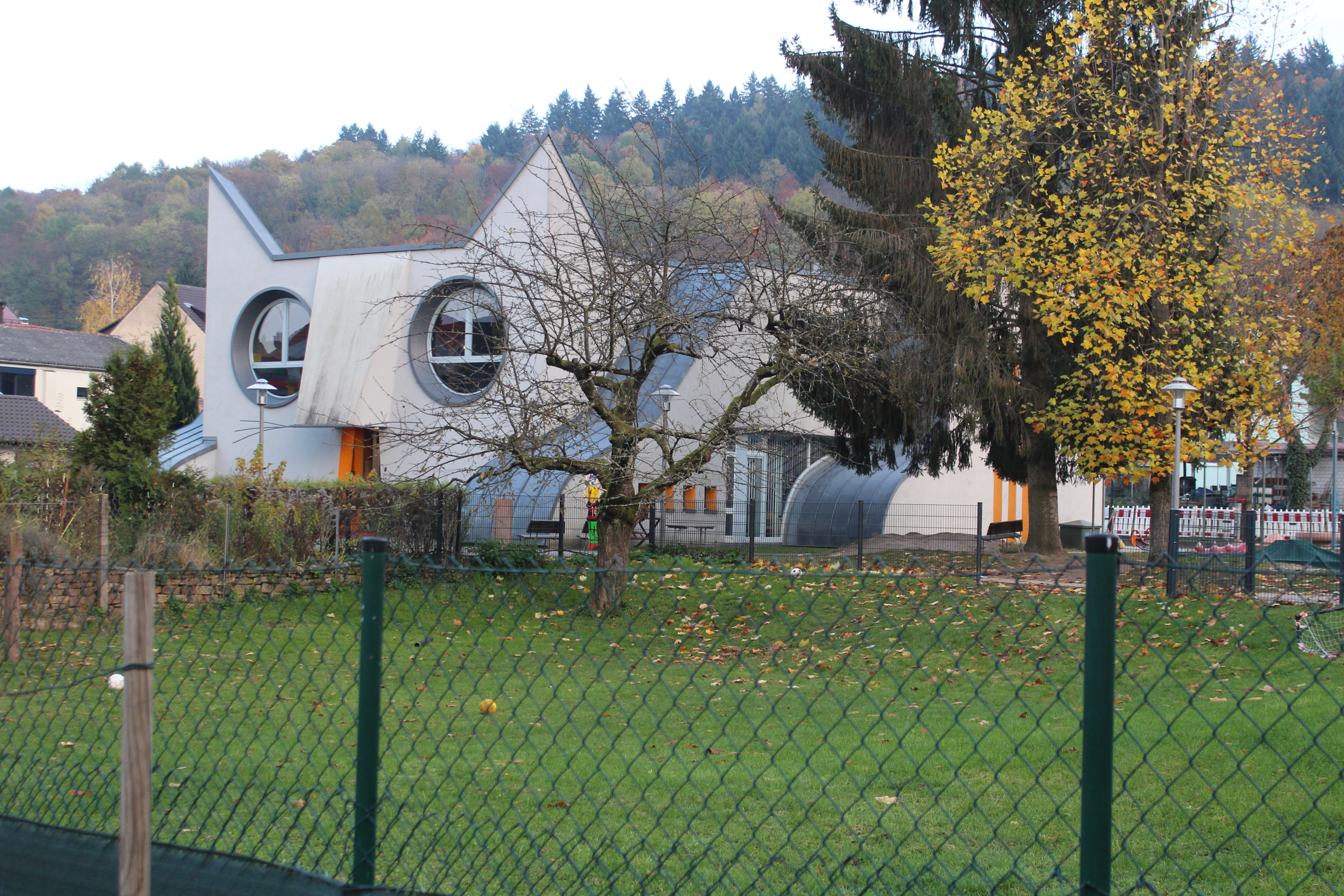
Wolfartsweier Cat Kindergarten in Germany

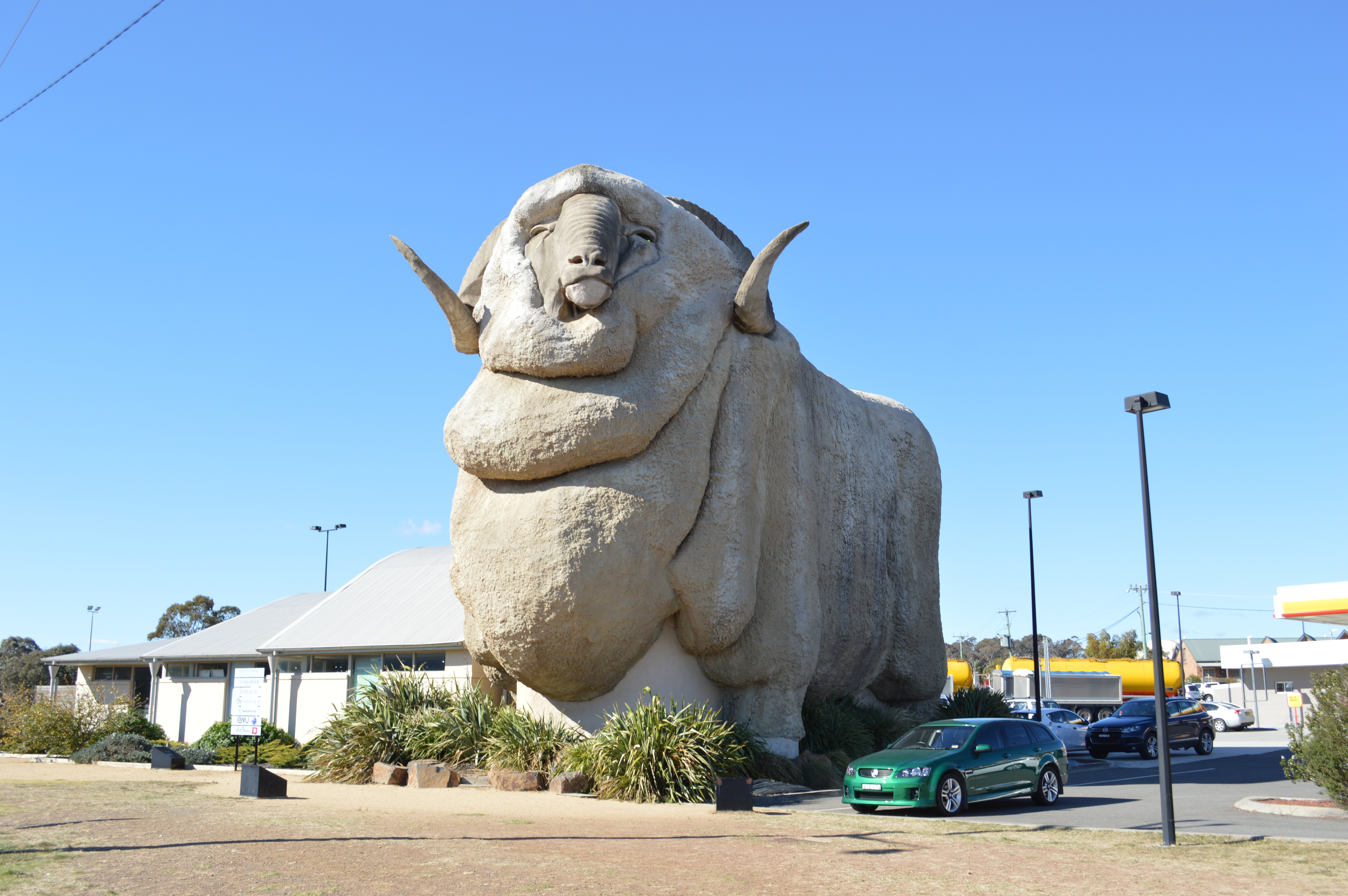
The Big Merino in Goulburn, New South Wales, Australia.

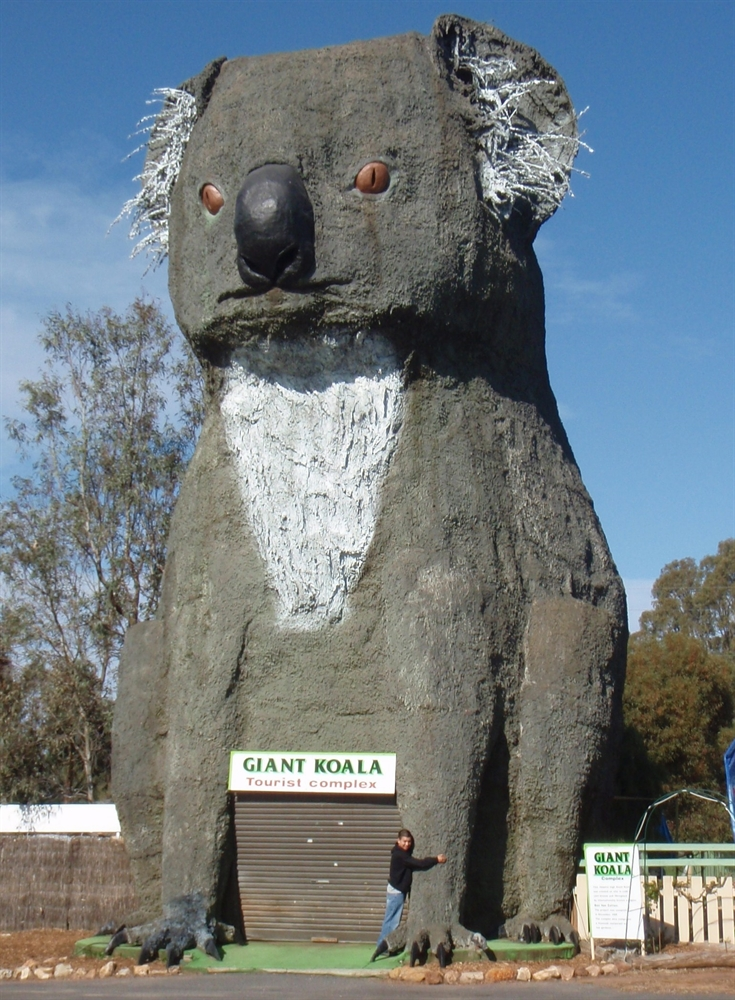
Giant Koala, Dadswells Bridge, Australia.

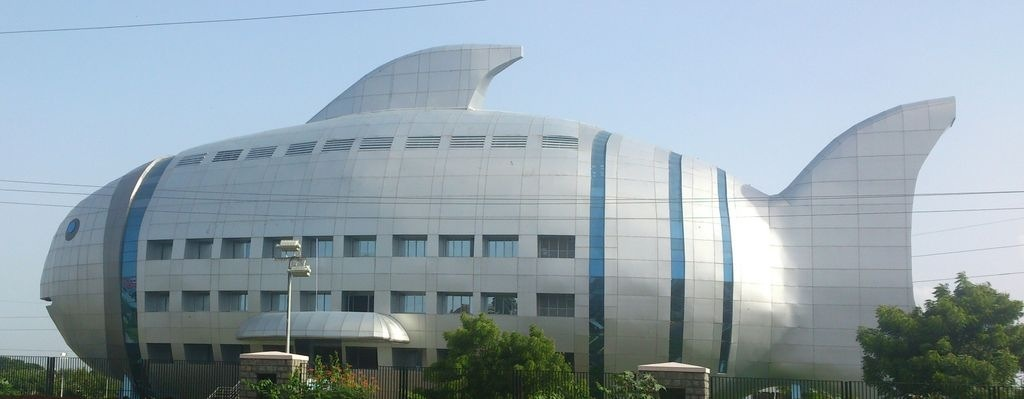
Office building of the National Fisheries Development Board in Hyderabad, India

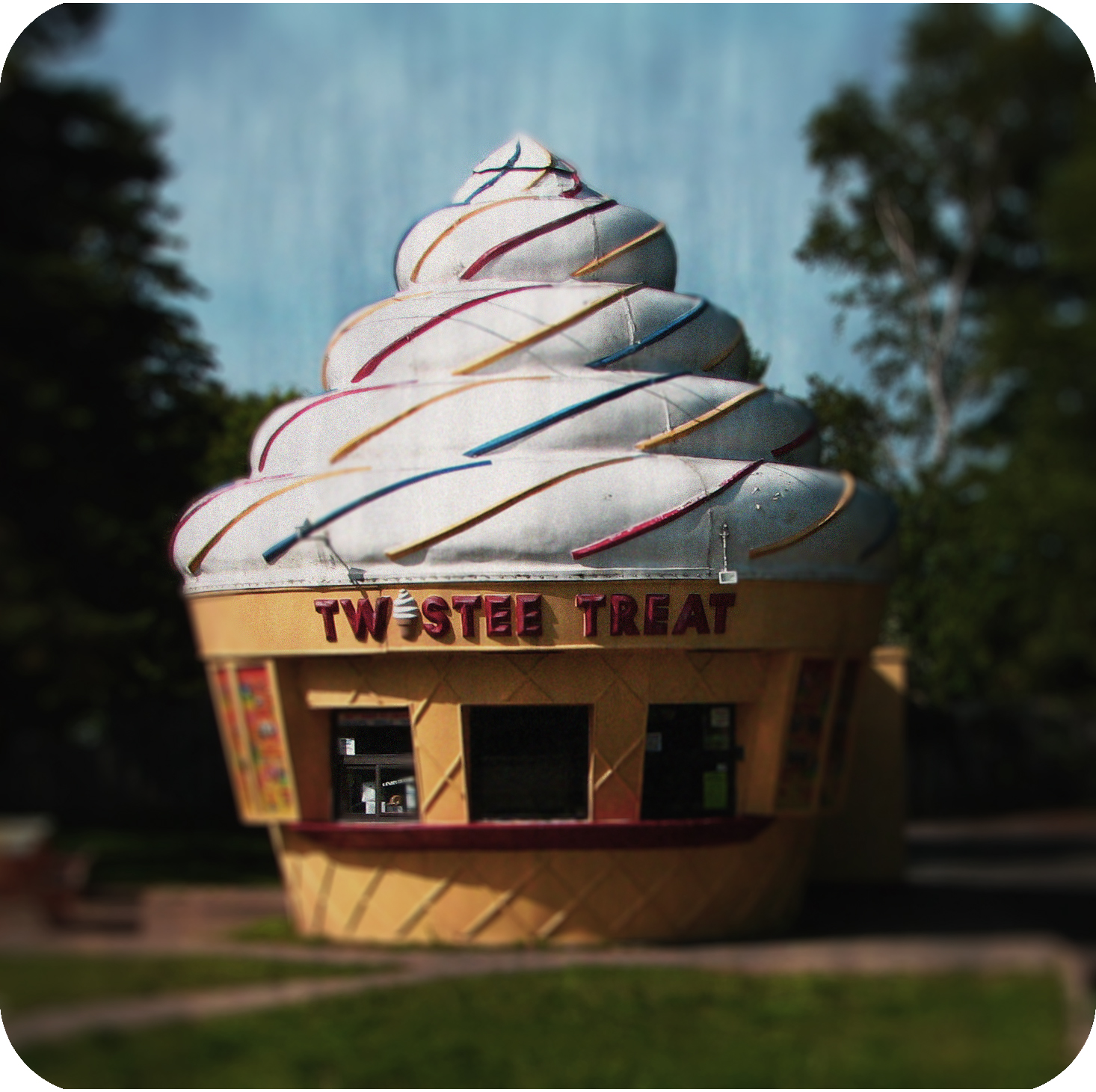
A Twistee Treat restaurant in Minden, Ontario, Canada

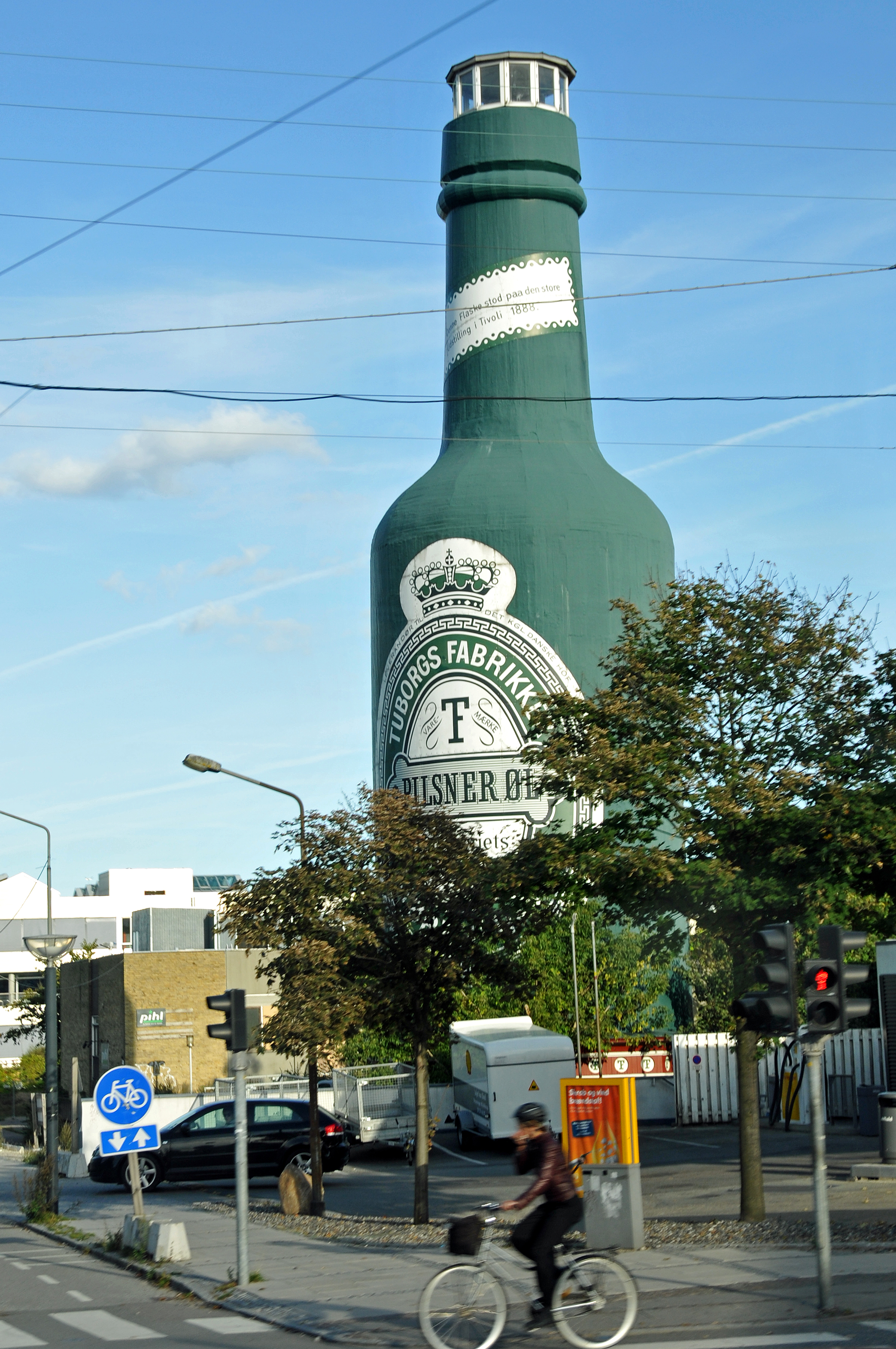
The Tuborg Bottle in Copenhagen, Denmark.

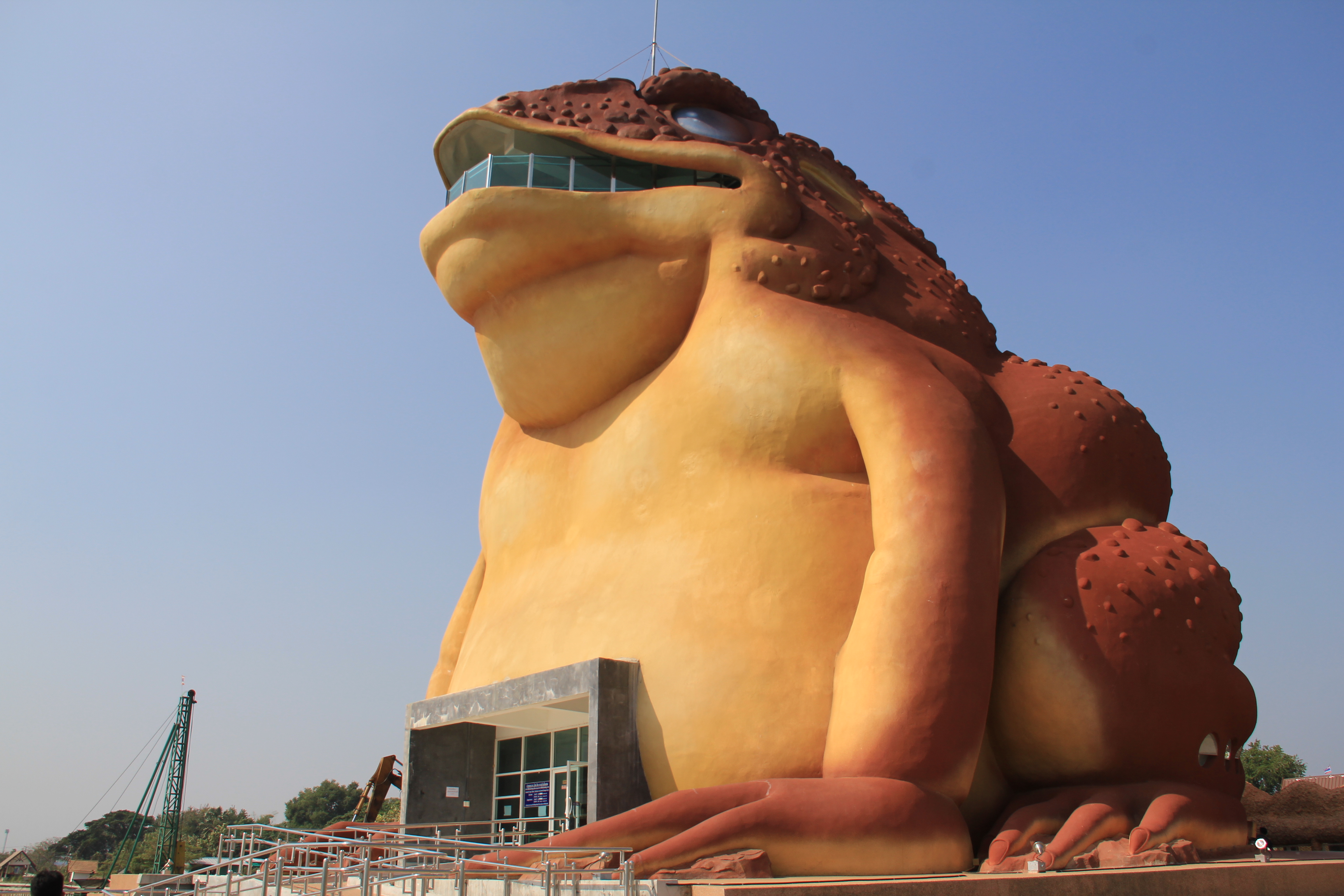
A museum in Yasothon, Thailand

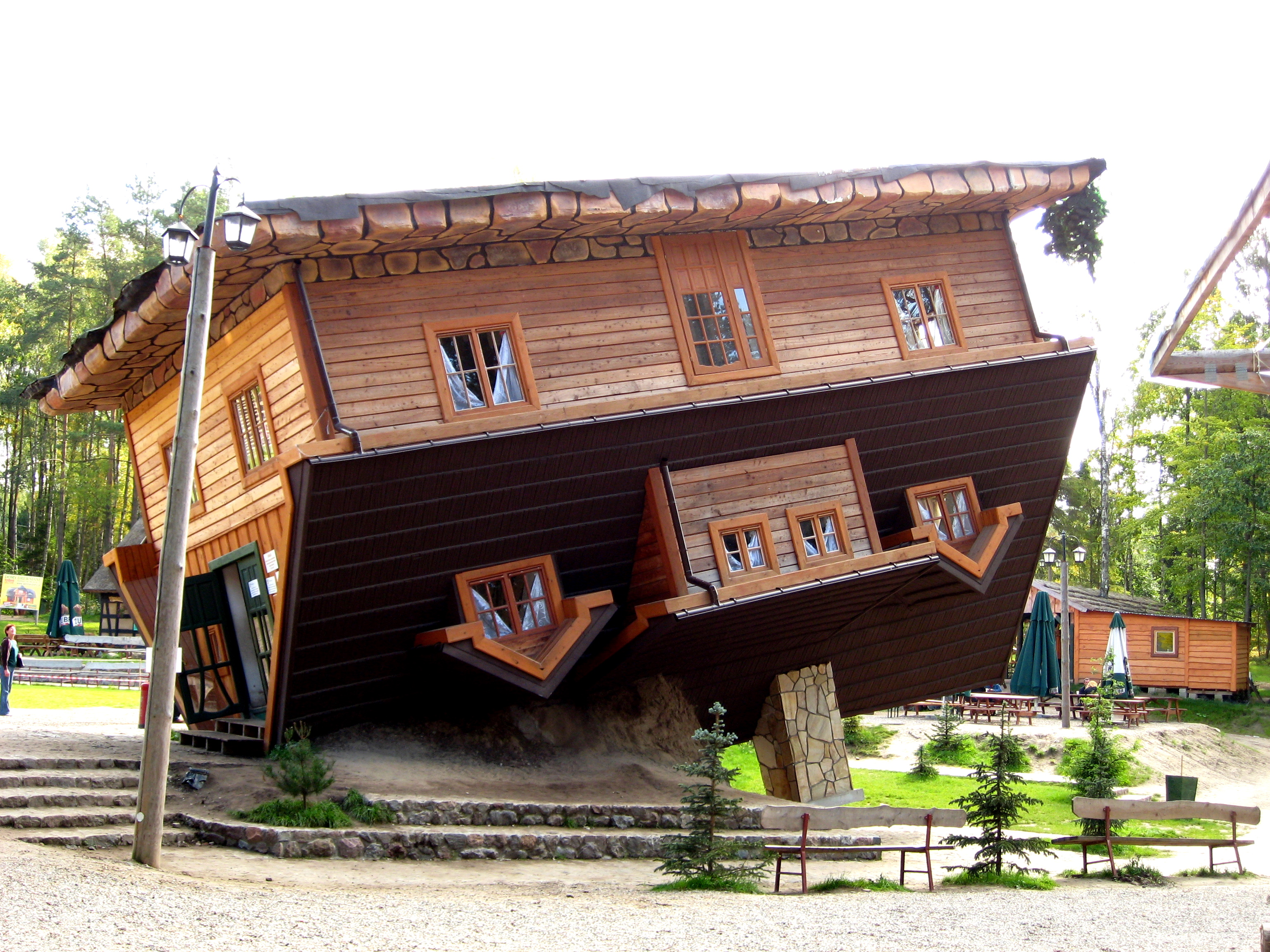
An upside-down house in Szymbark, Poland.

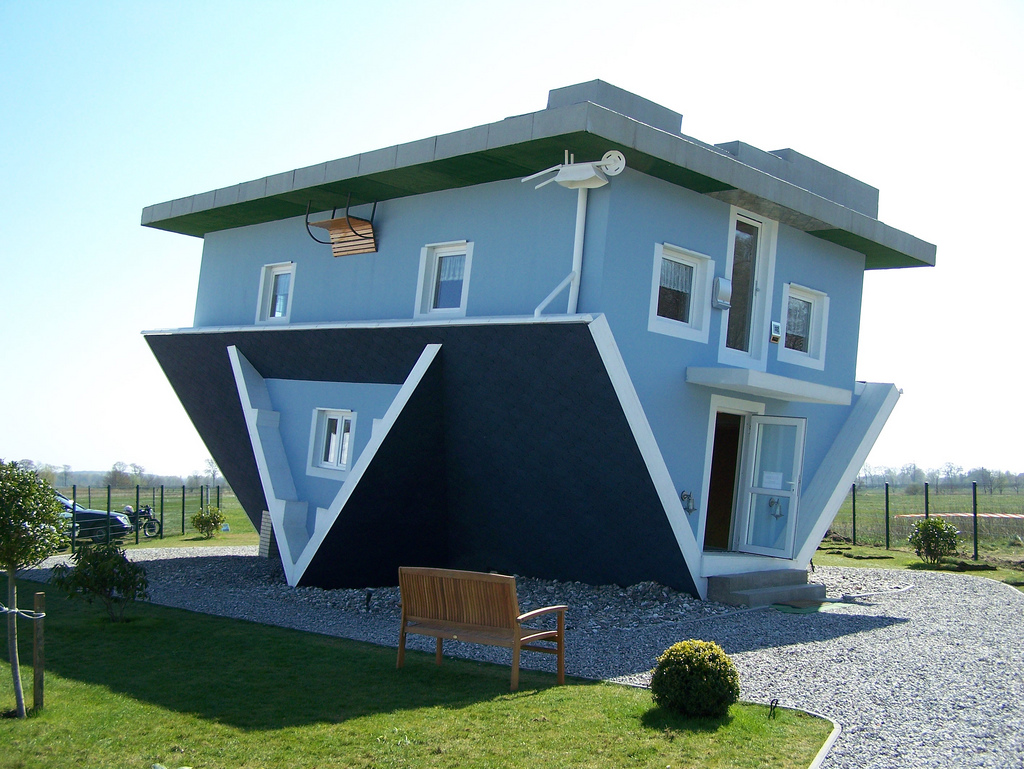
The Upside-Down House of Trassenheide, Germany

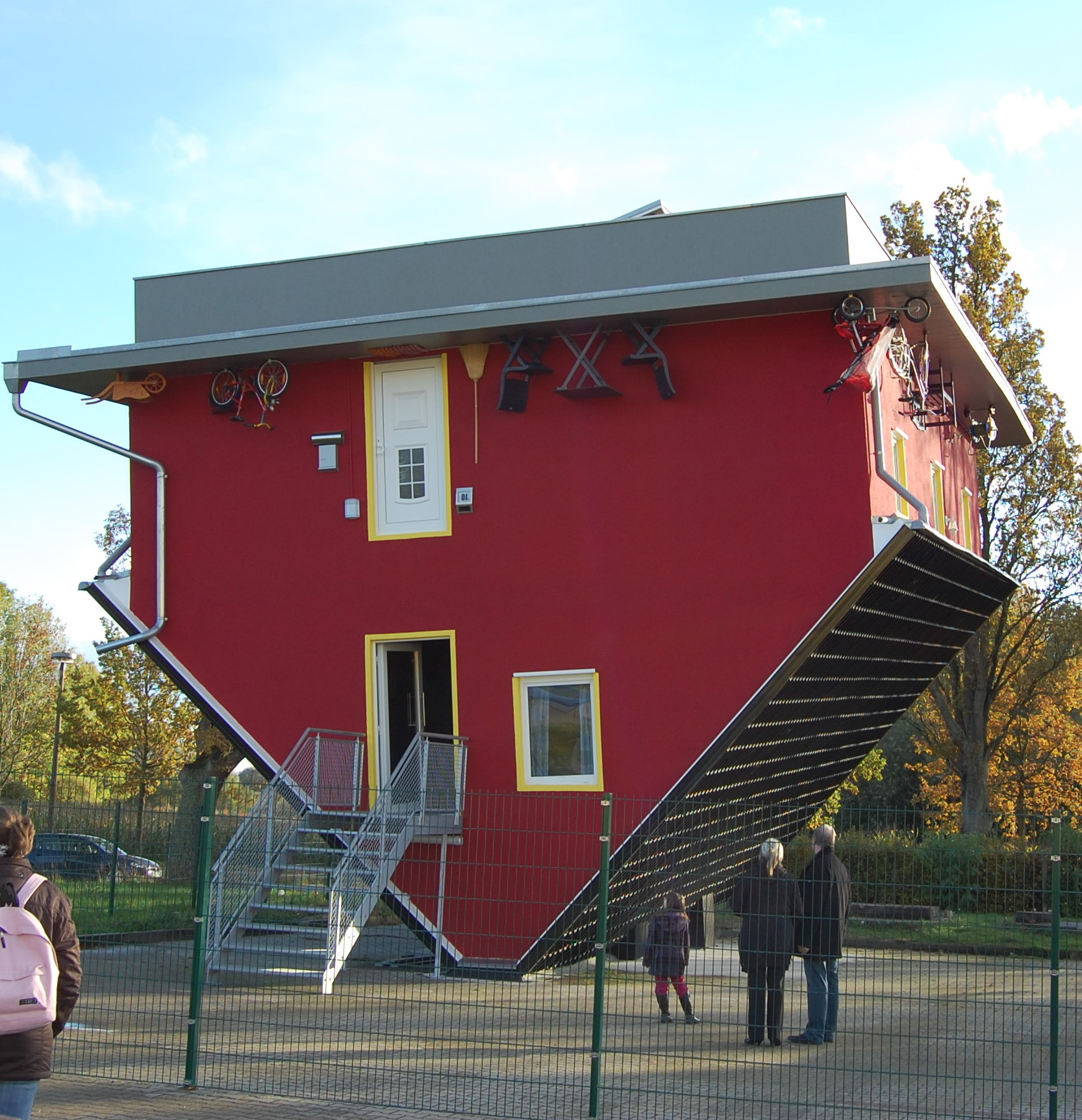
Rügen, Germany

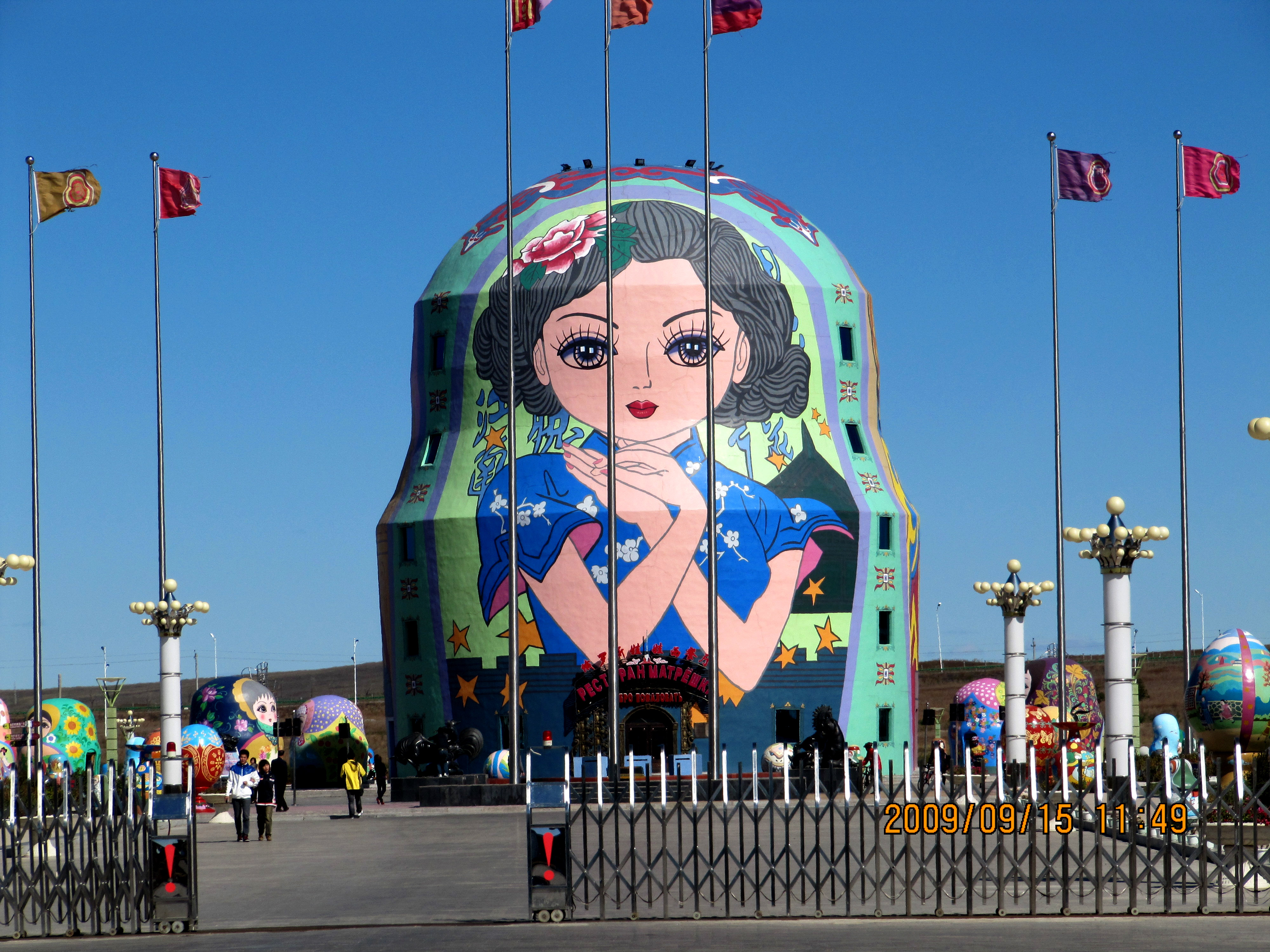
The Matryoshka Hotel in Manzhouli, Inner Mongolia Autonomous Region, China

=== In the United States ===
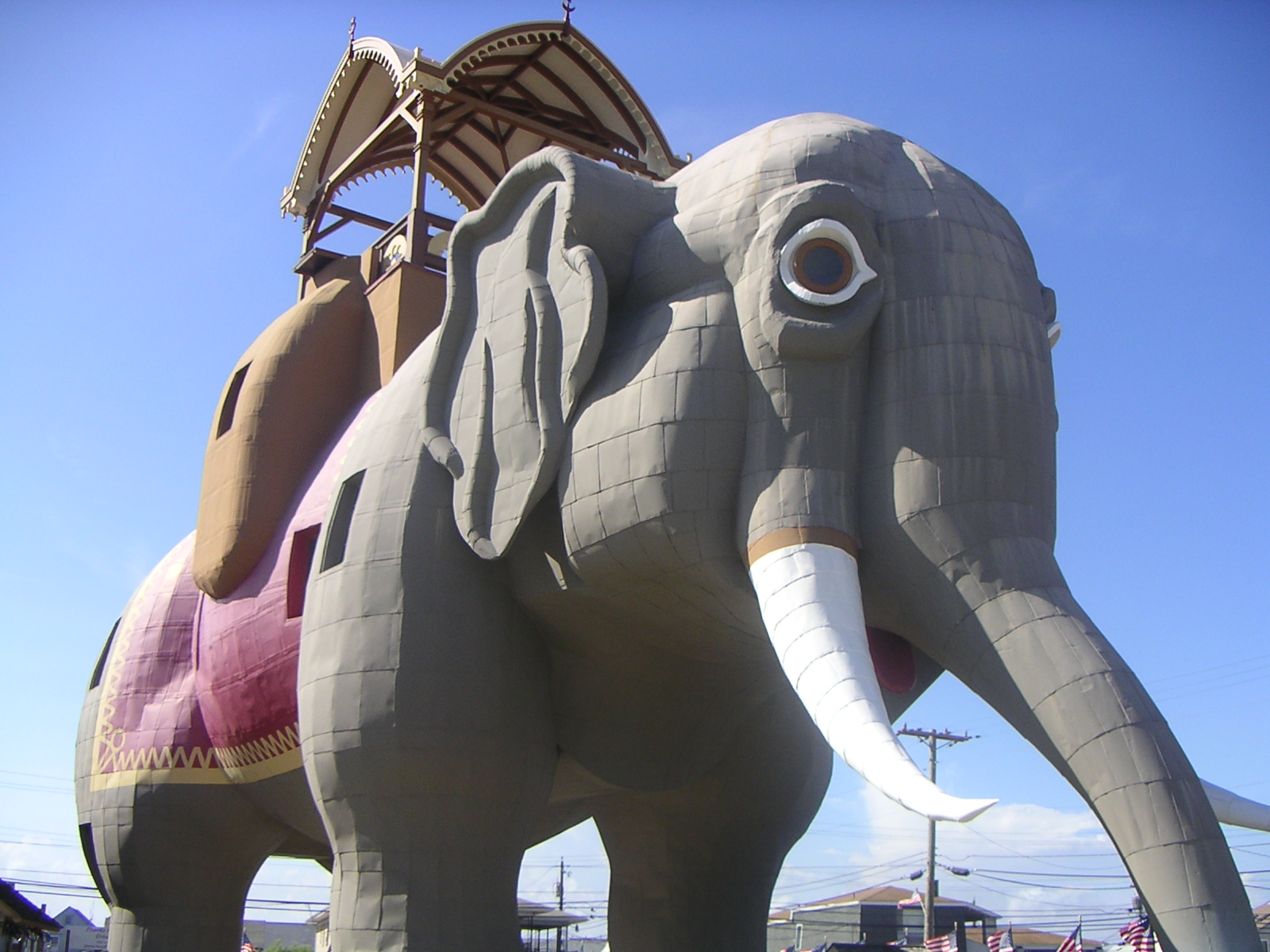
Lucy the Elephant in Margate City, New Jersey (1881)

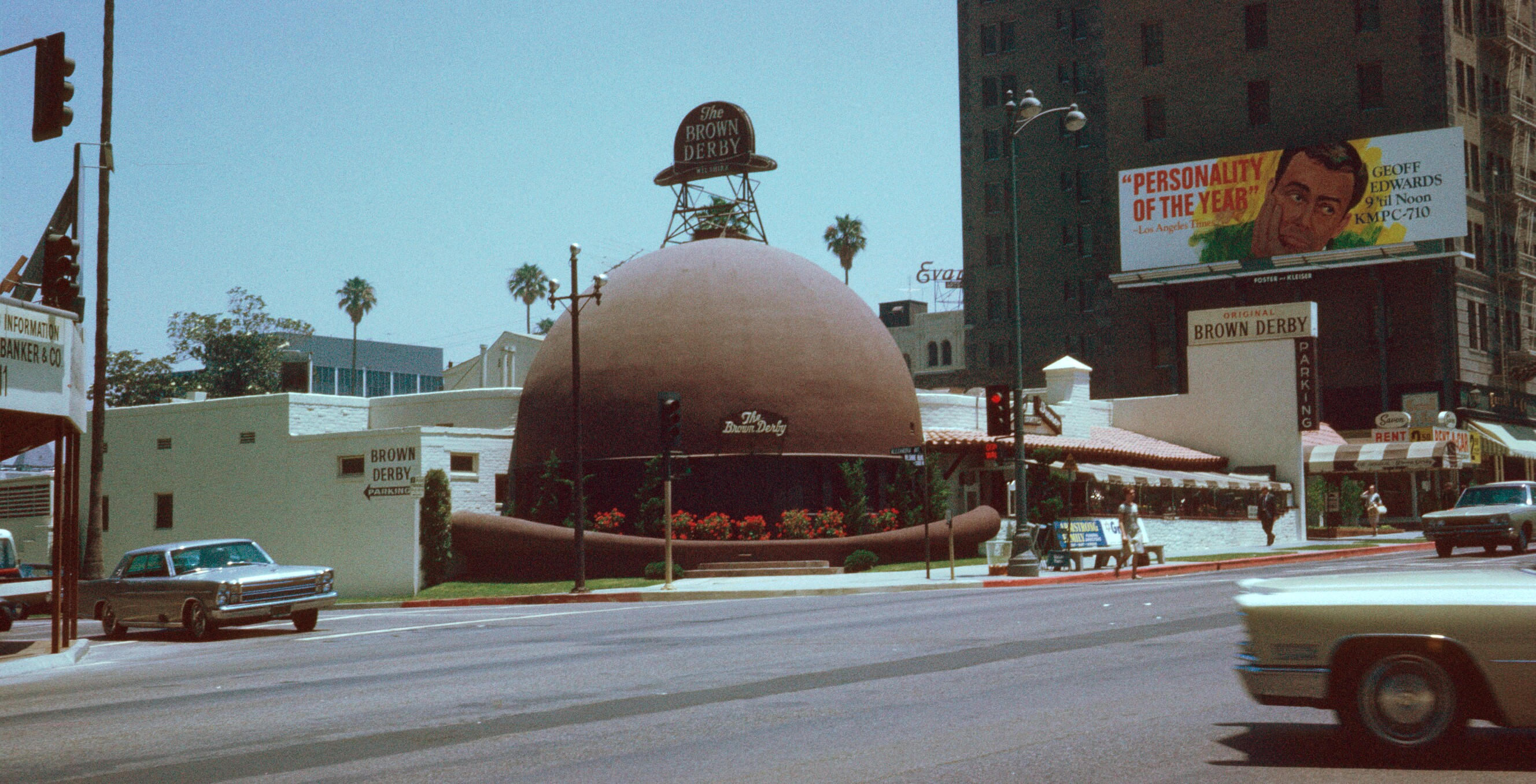
The original Brown Derby in Los Angeles, California (1926)

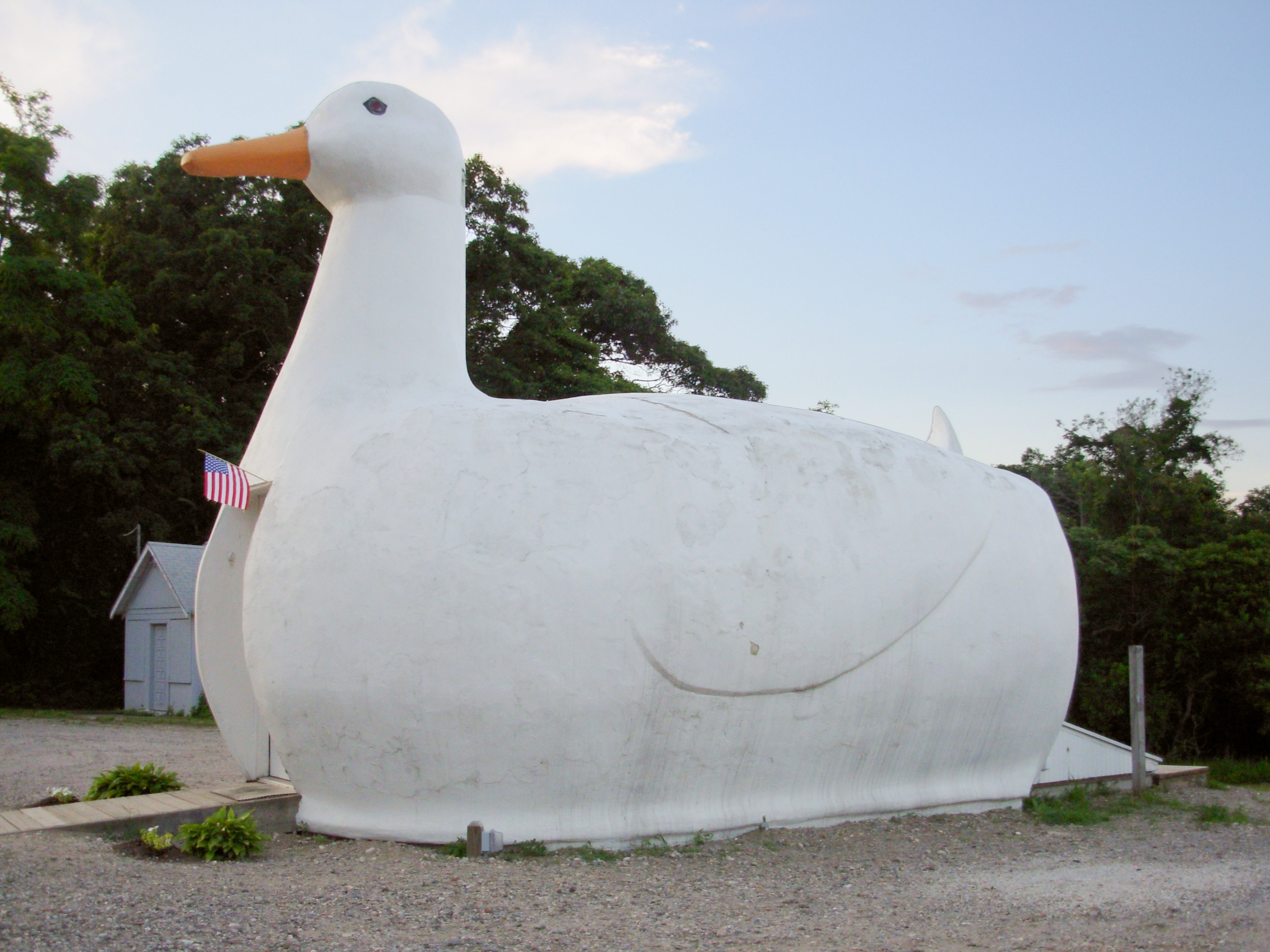
The Big Duck in Flanders, New York (1931)

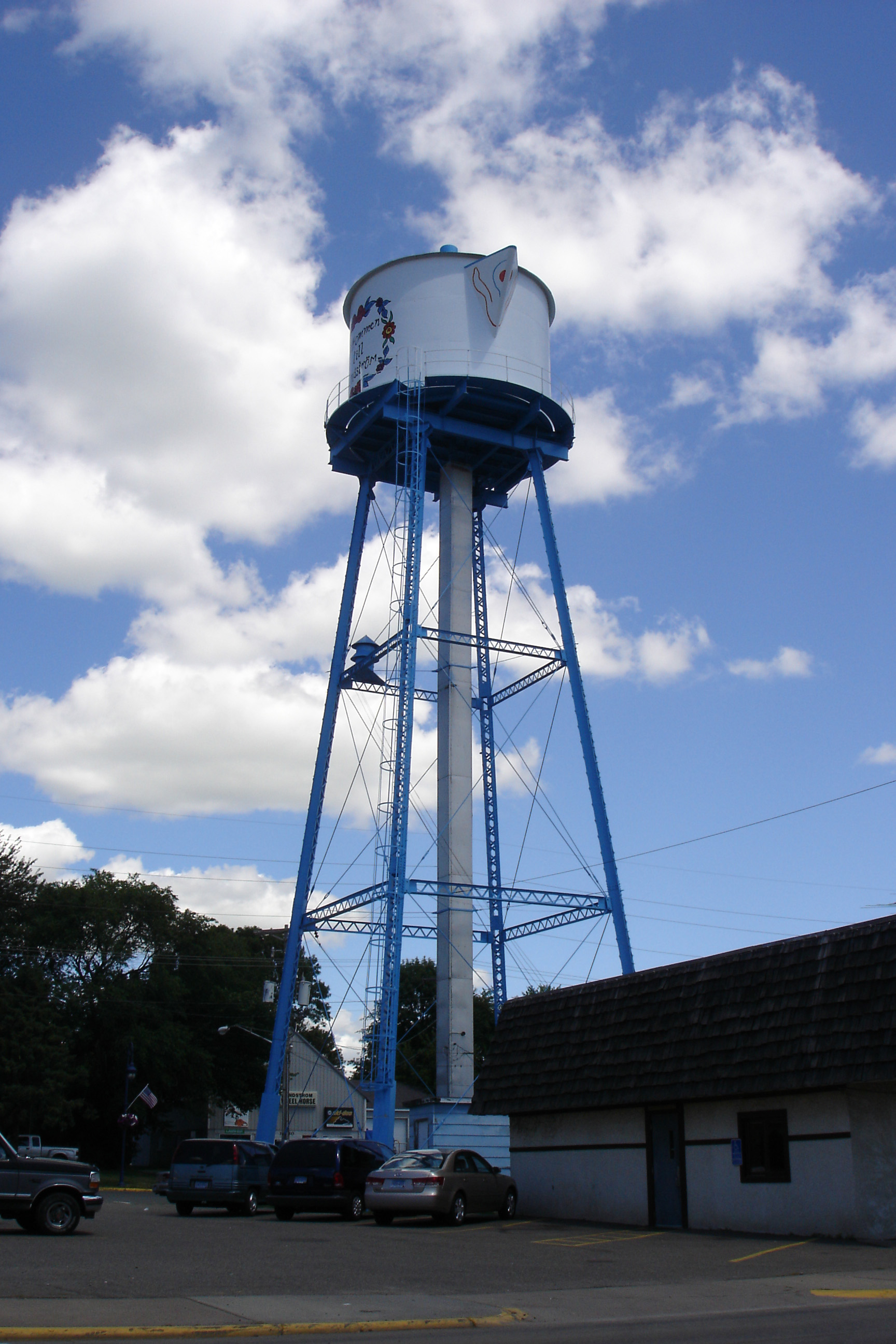
Coffeepot water tower in Lindstrom, Minnesota (1902)

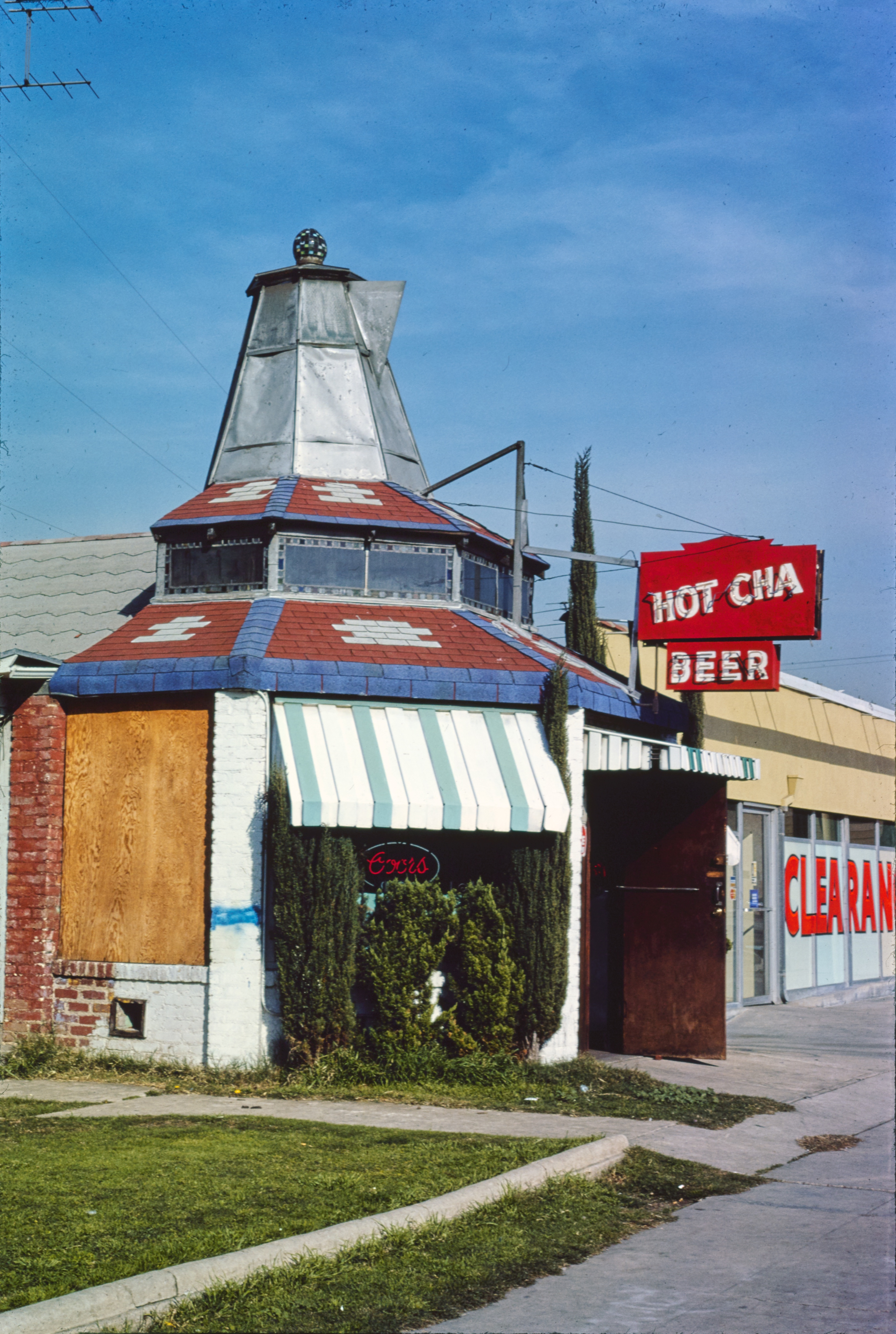
Hot Cha Cafe, now Koffee Pot Cafe; Long Beach, California (ca. 1932)

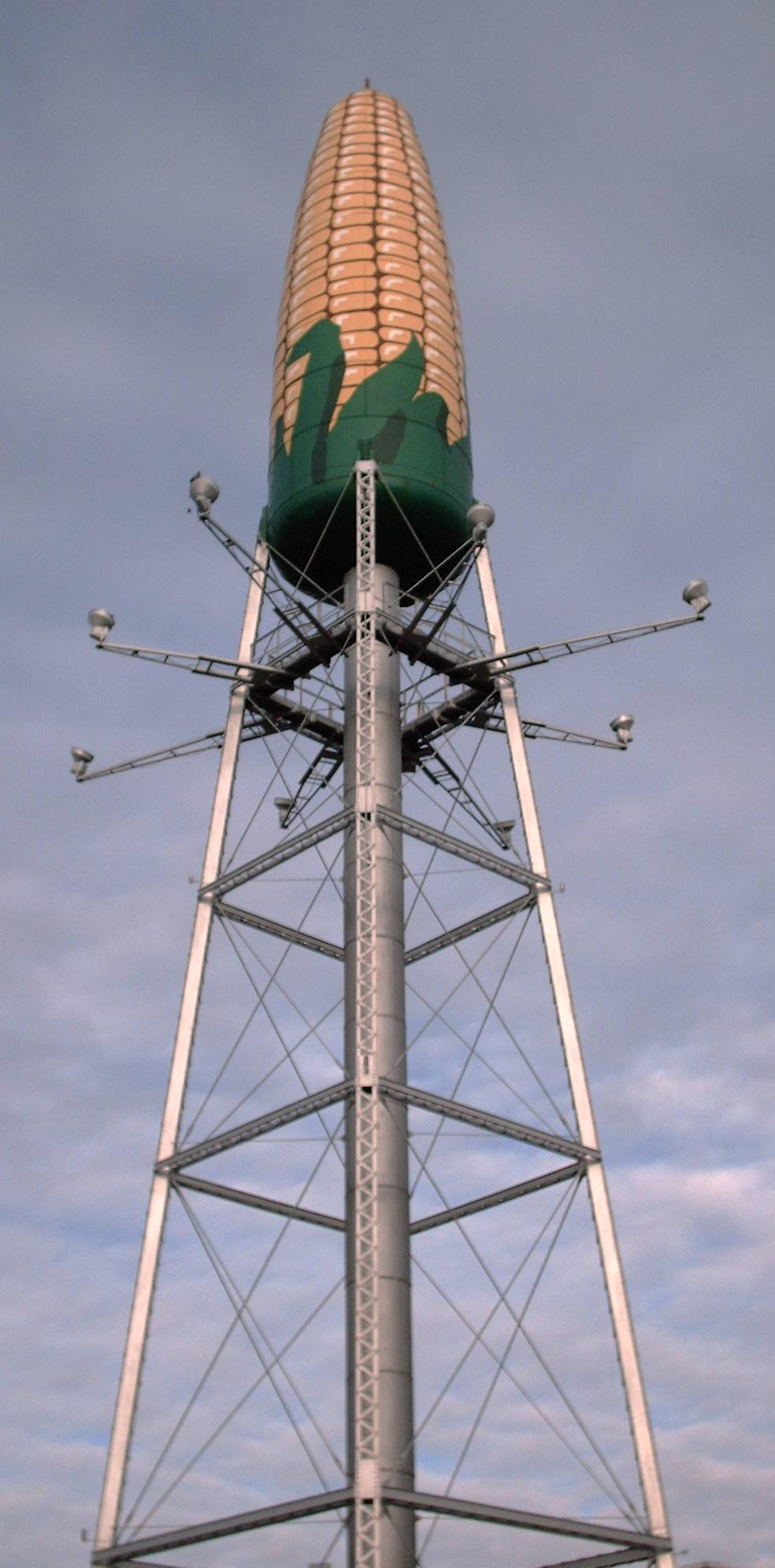
Corn cob water tower in Rochester, Minnesota (1931)

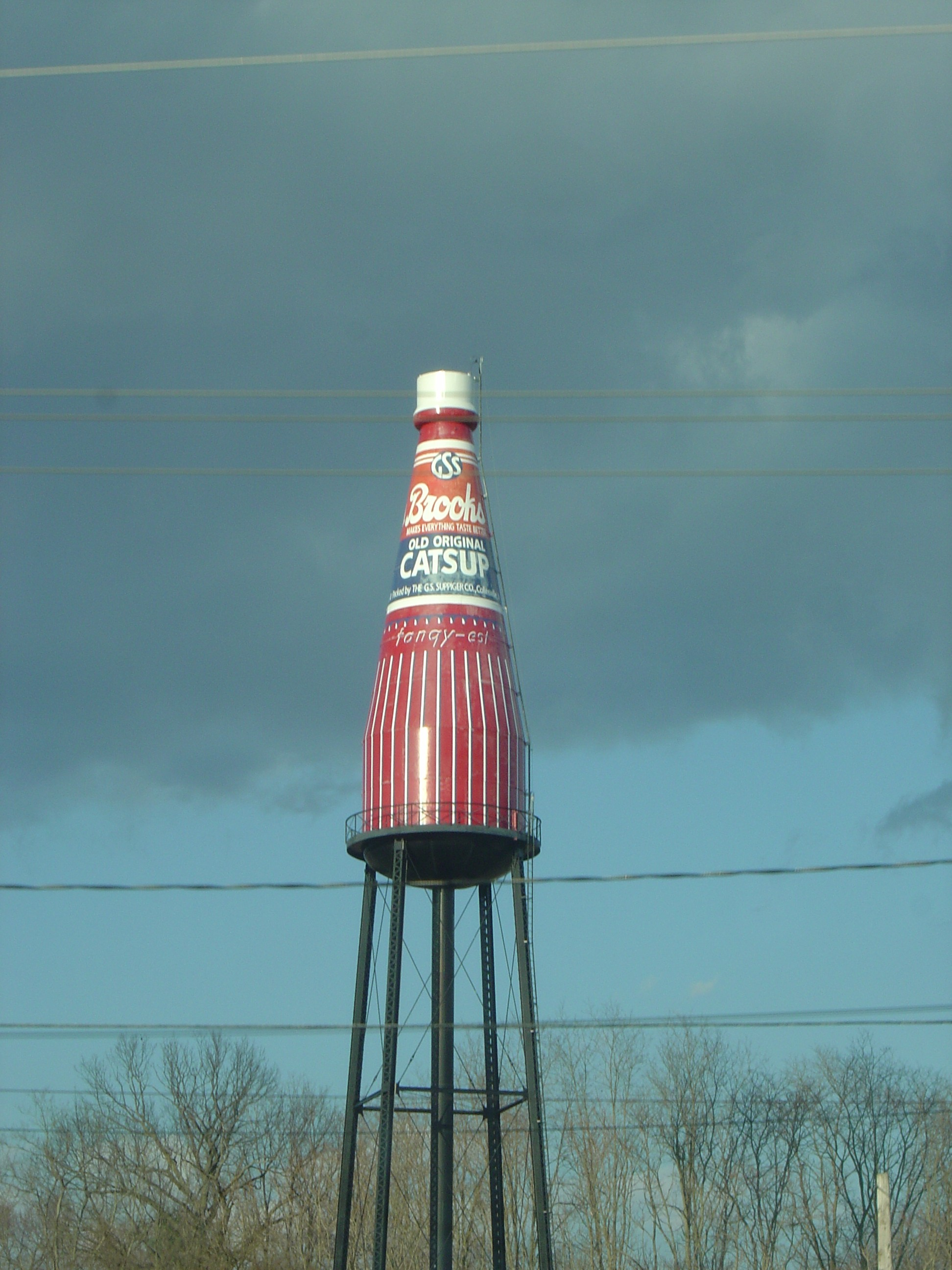
World's Largest Catsup Bottle water tower in Collinsville, Illinois (1949)

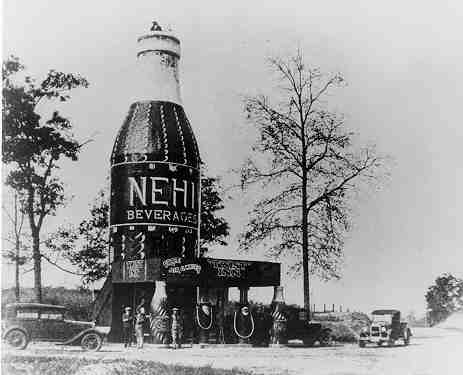
A 64-foot-tall (20 m) Nehi Bottle located near Auburn, Alabama, in an area referred to as "The Bottle" (destroyed by fire in 1933)

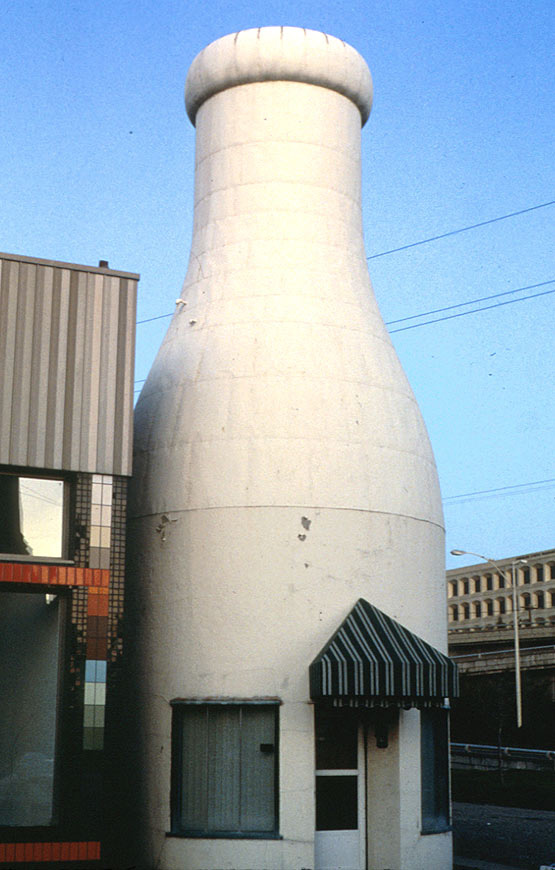
Benewah Milk Bottle in Spokane, Washington (1935)

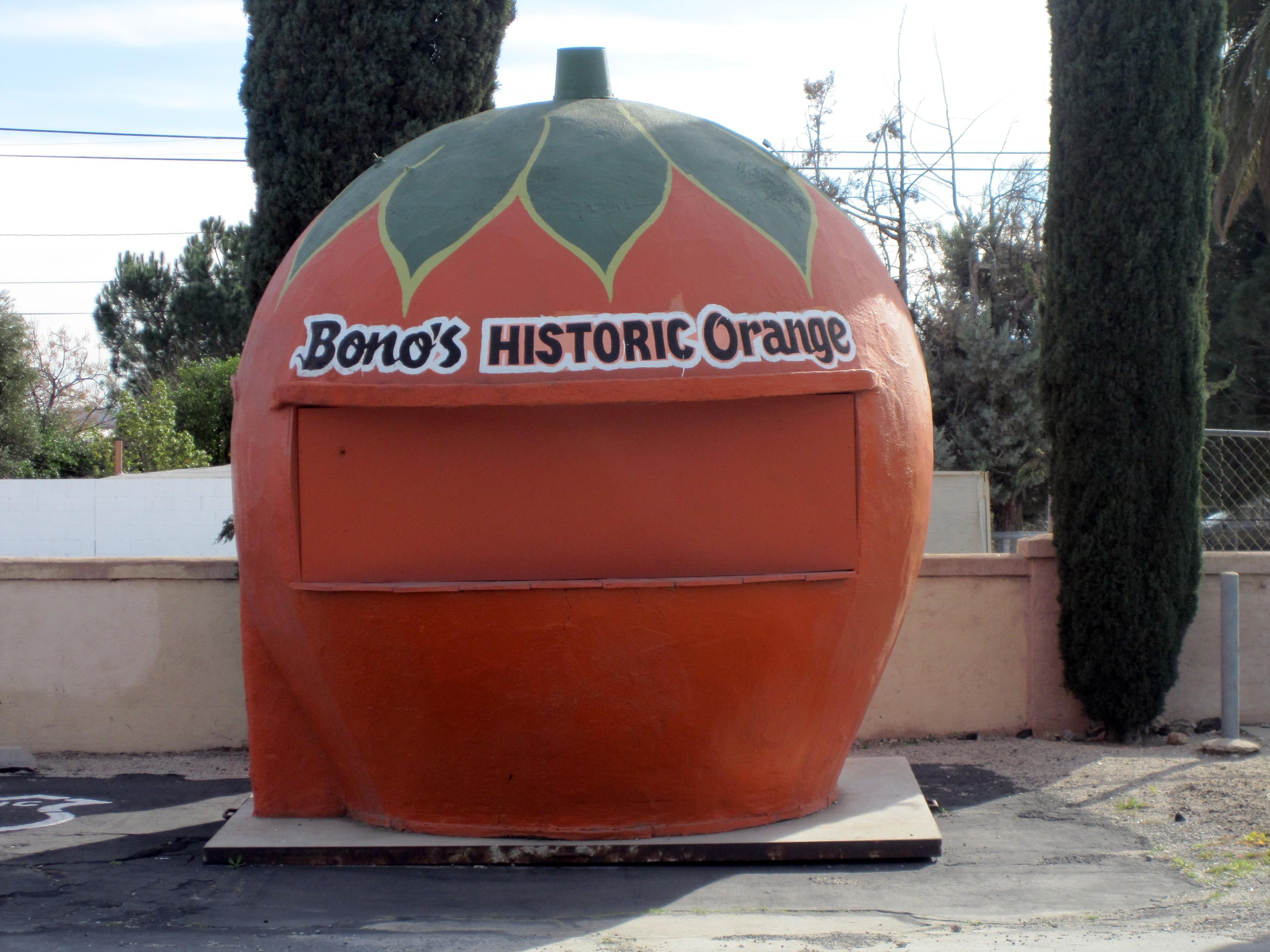
Bono's Orange Stand in Fontana, California (1936)

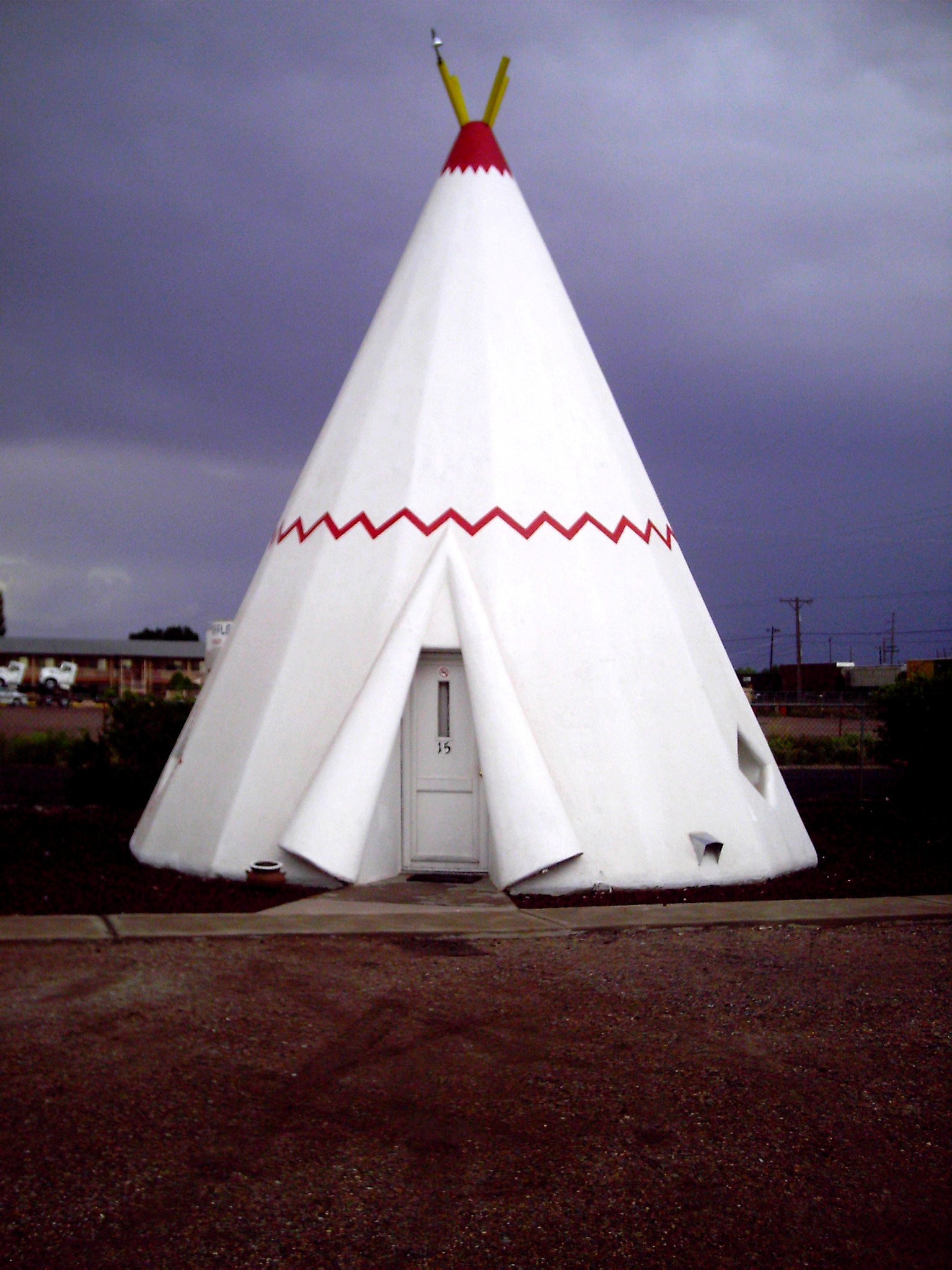
Wigwam Motel in Holbrook, Arizona (1950)

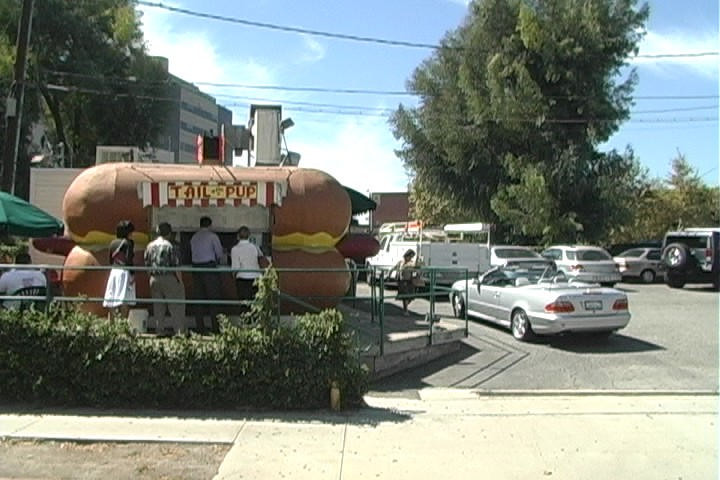
Tail O' the Pup hot dog stand in Los Angeles, California

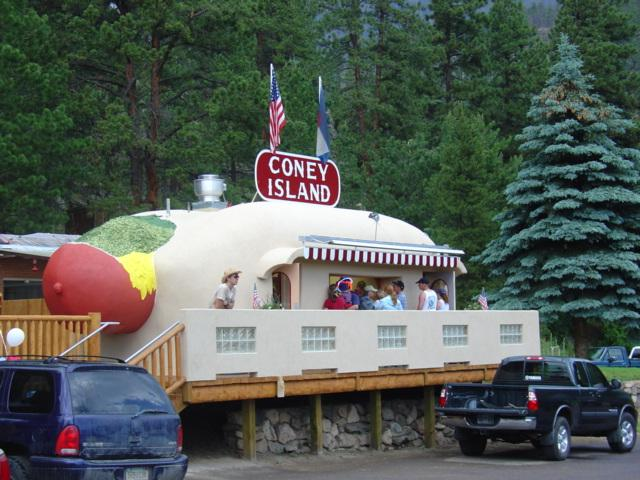
Coney Island Hot Dog Stand in Bailey, Colorado (1966)

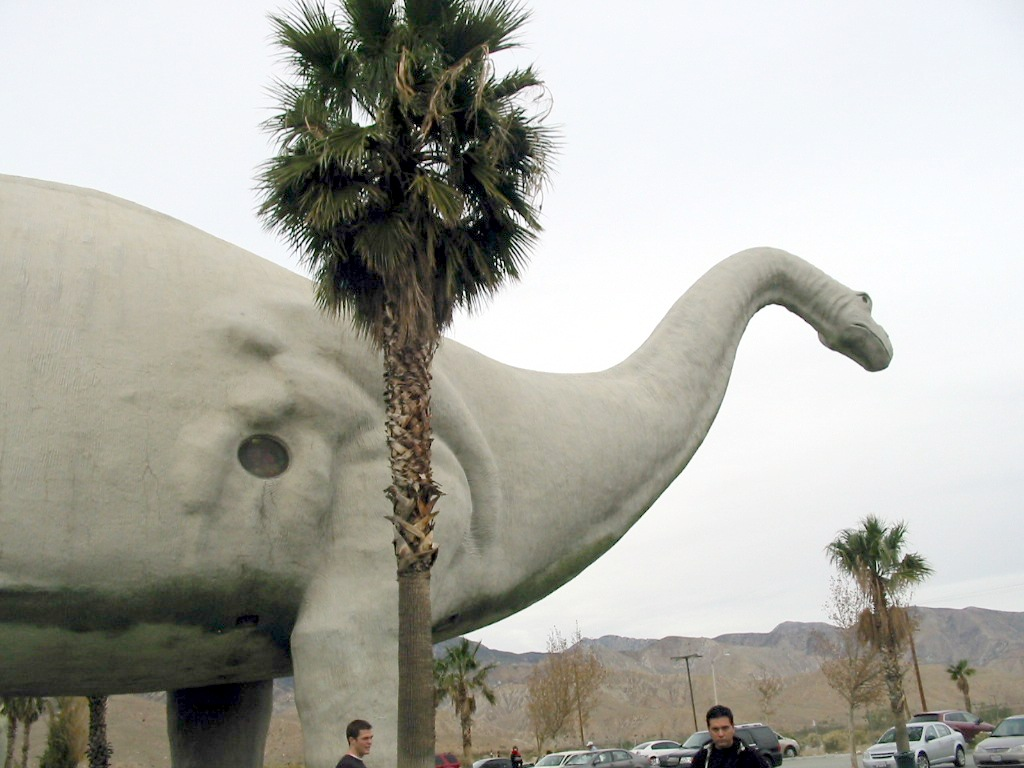
At Cabazon Dinosaurs in Cabazon, California; this dinosaur's belly holds a souvenir shop

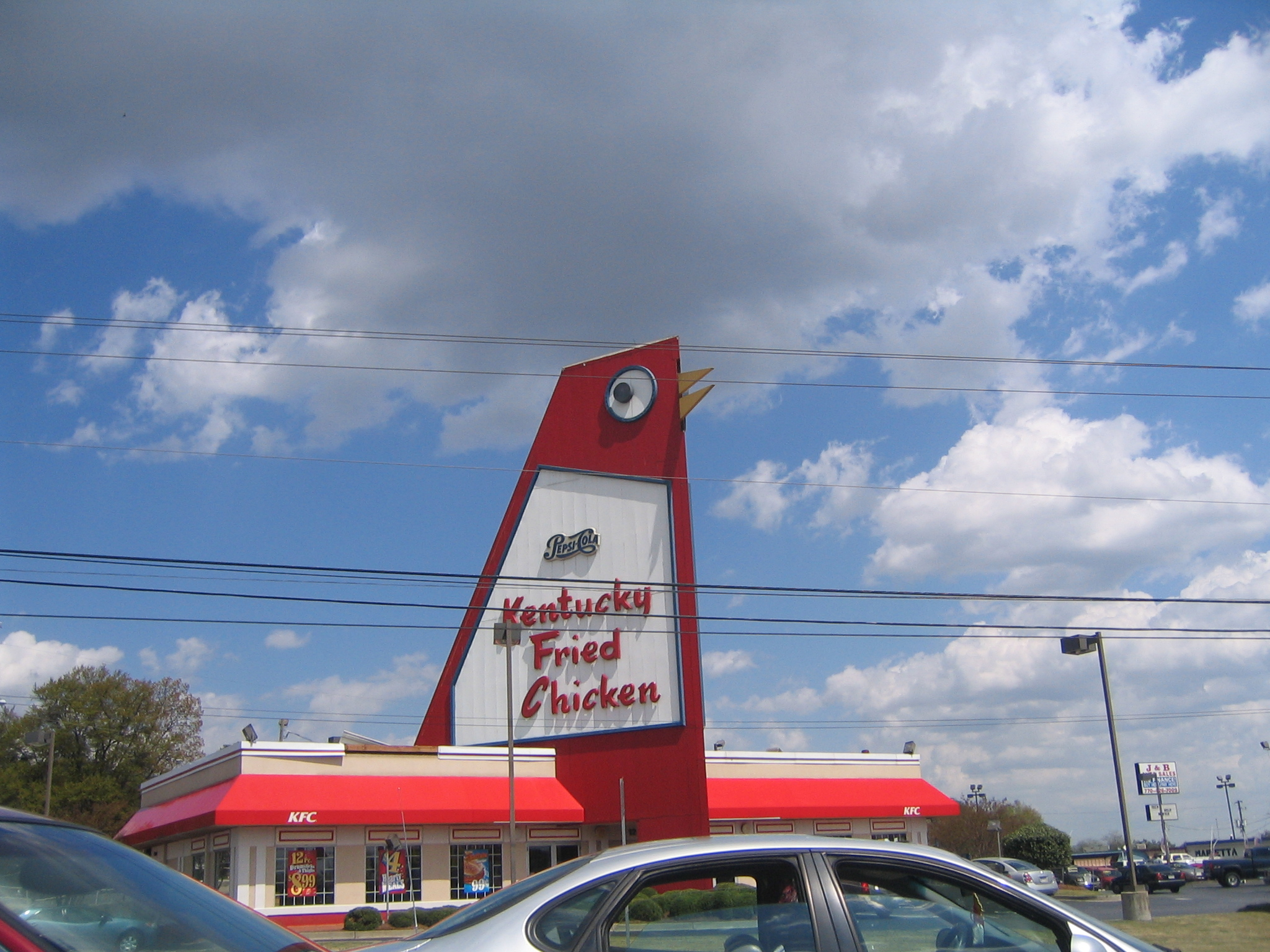
The Big Chicken in Marietta, Georgia

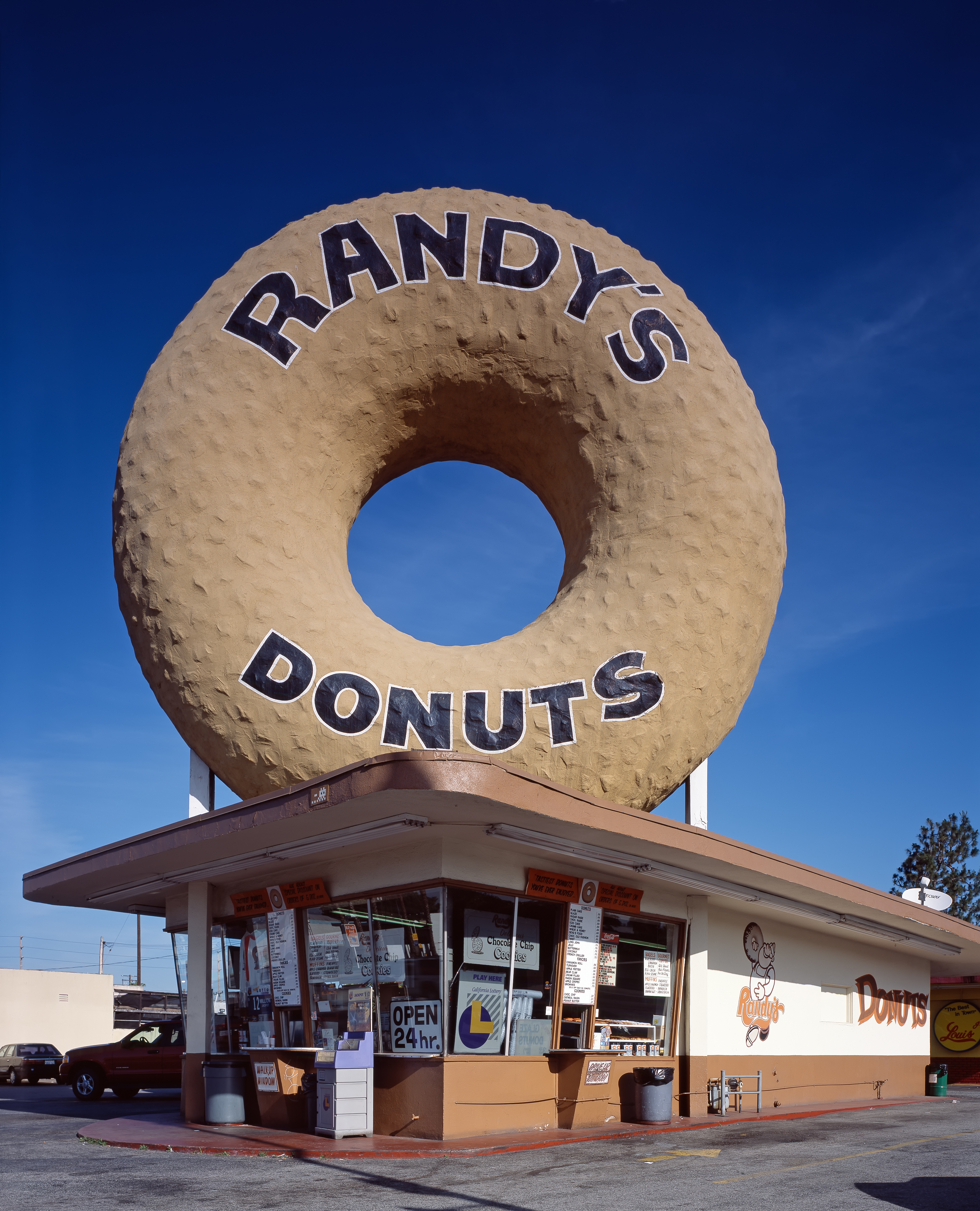
Randy's Donuts (1953) in Inglewood, California (Note: The Los Angeles Conservancy admits that Randy’s Donuts might not strictly qualify as Programmatic architecture where a building is shaped like the product it sells. However, the Conservancy would "look the other way" and designated the shop as a Programmatic design since "the donut on its roof is just so large, so uncompromising, so demanding of our attention.")

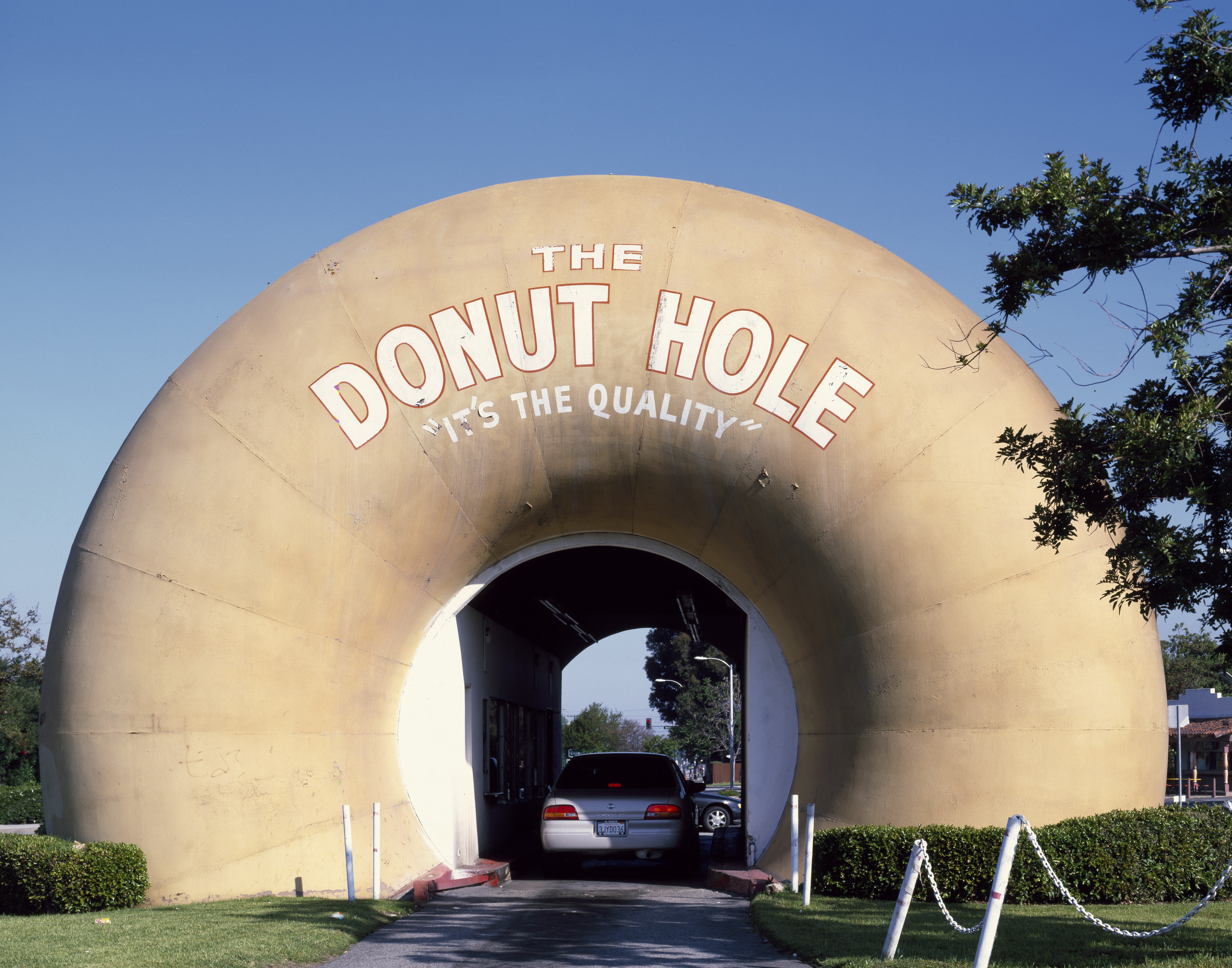
The Donut Hole in La Puente, California

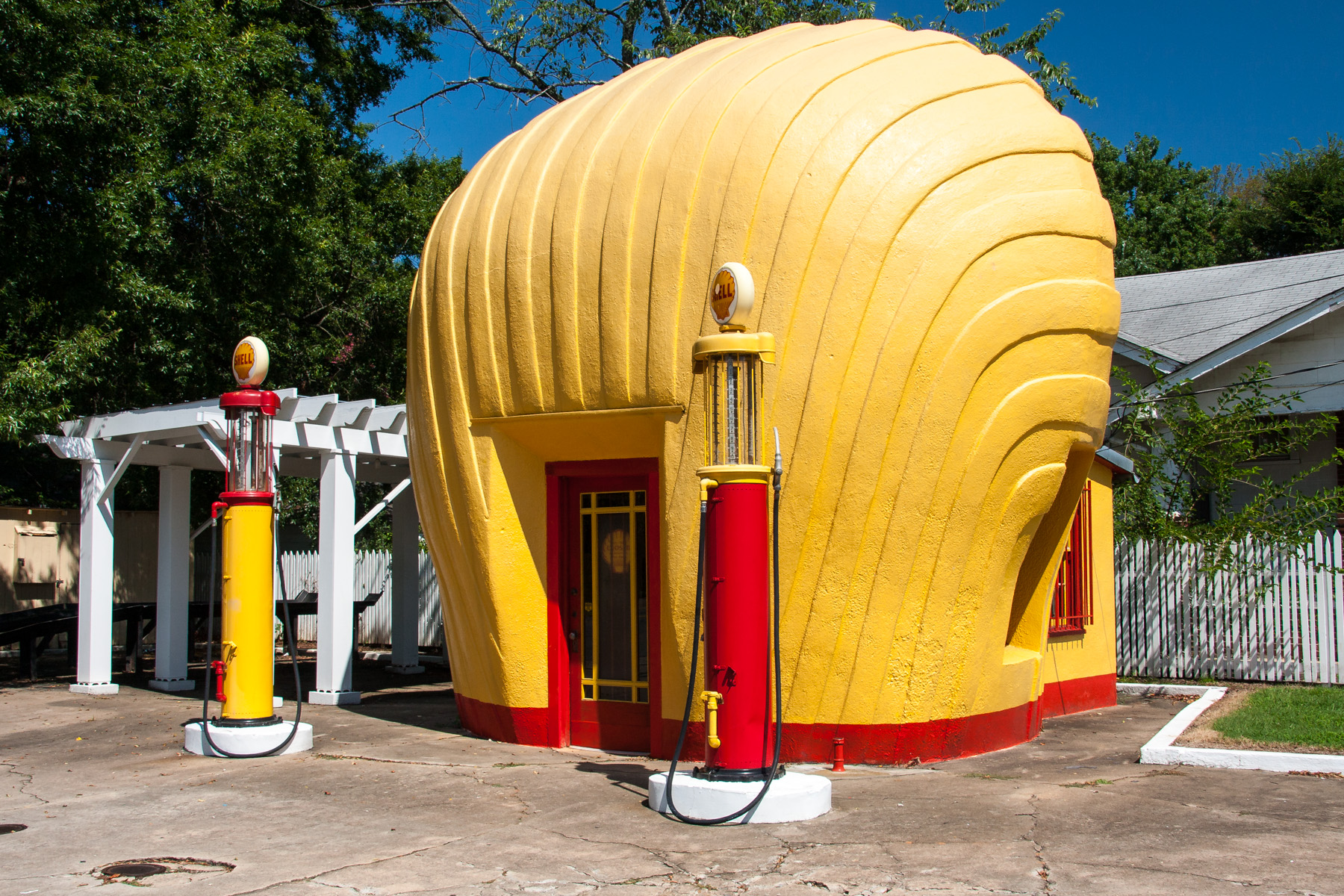
Shell Service Station in Winston-Salem, North Carolina

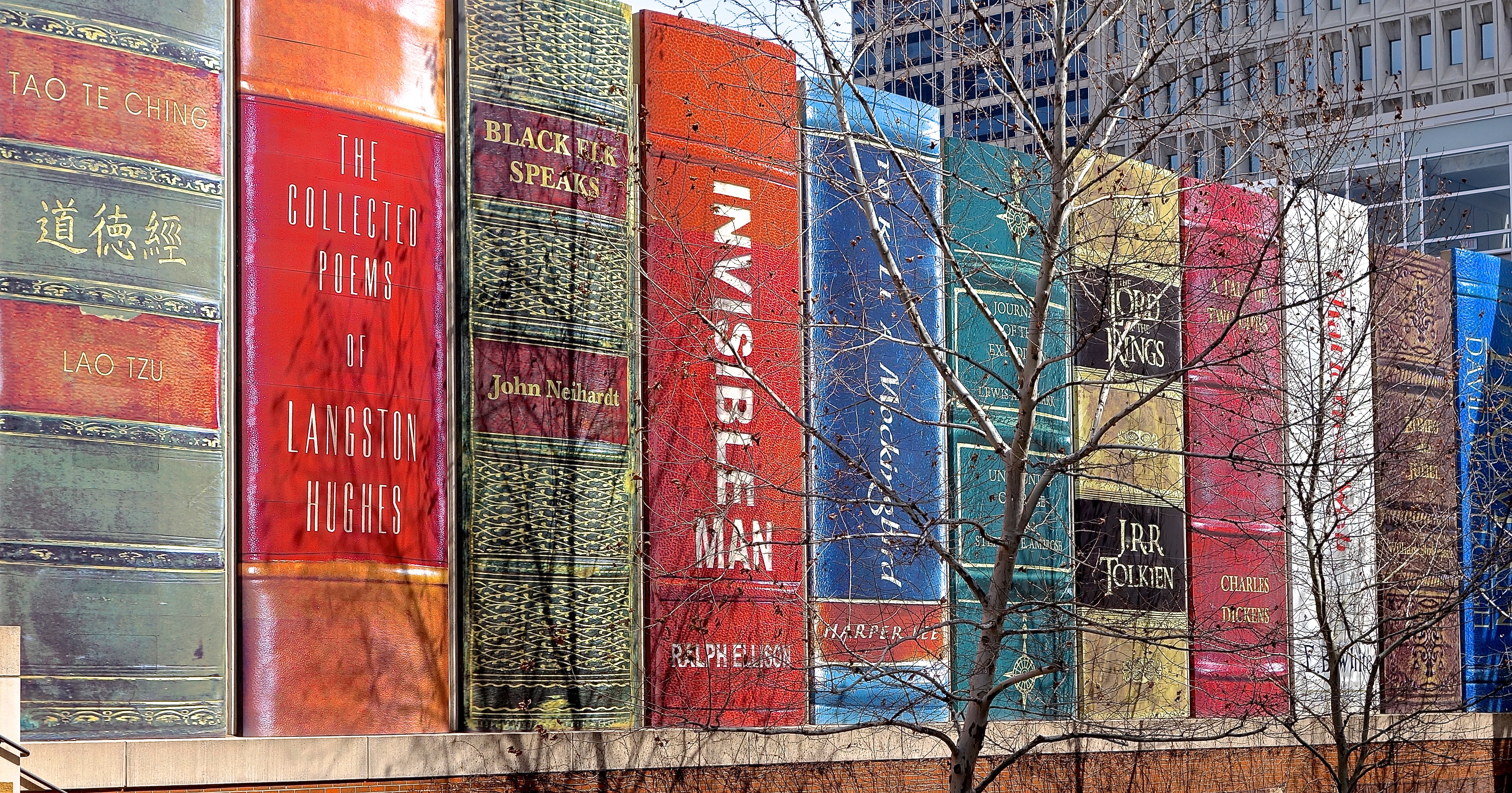
Kansas City Public Library's parking garage (2004)

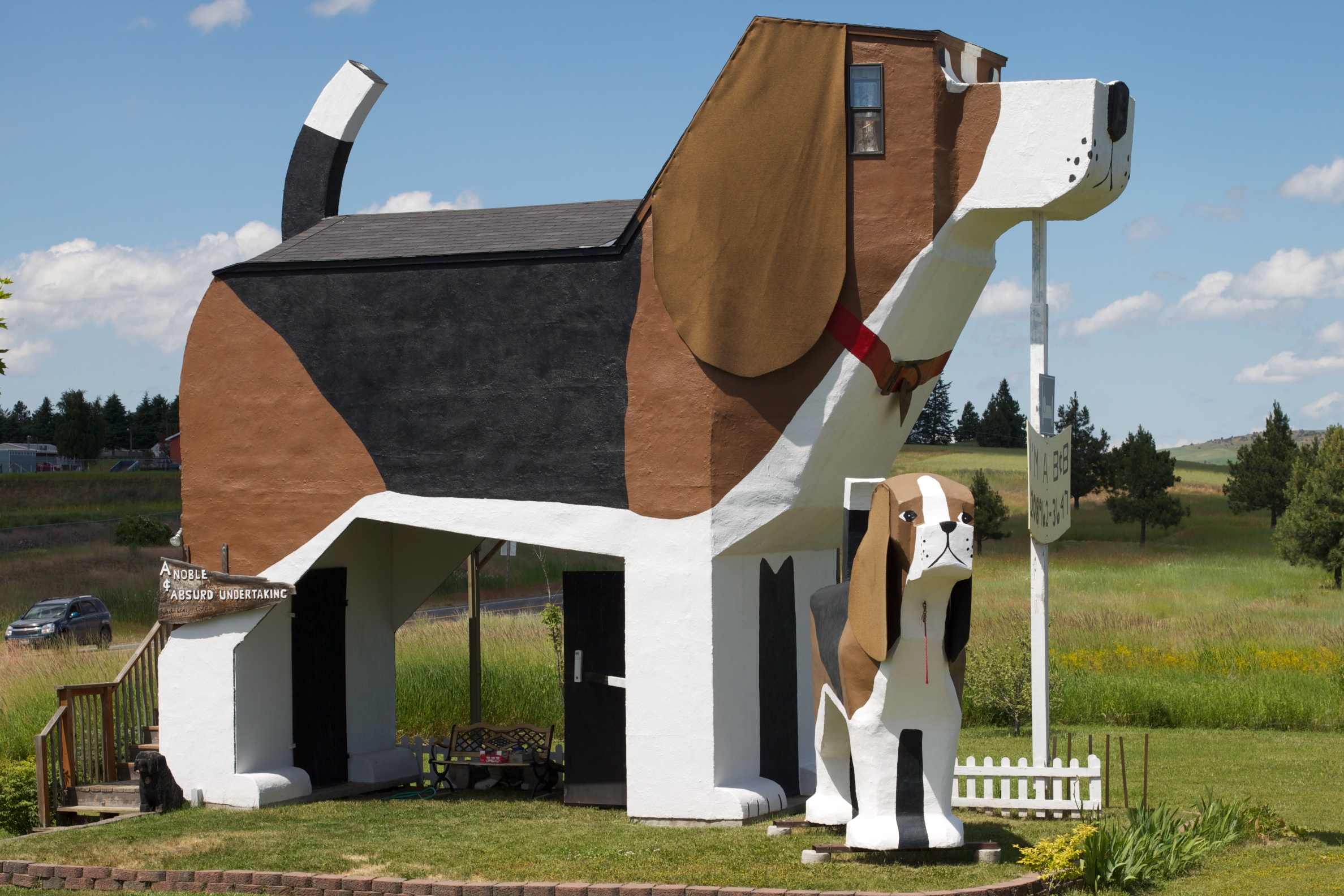
Dog Bark Park, Cottonwood, Idaho

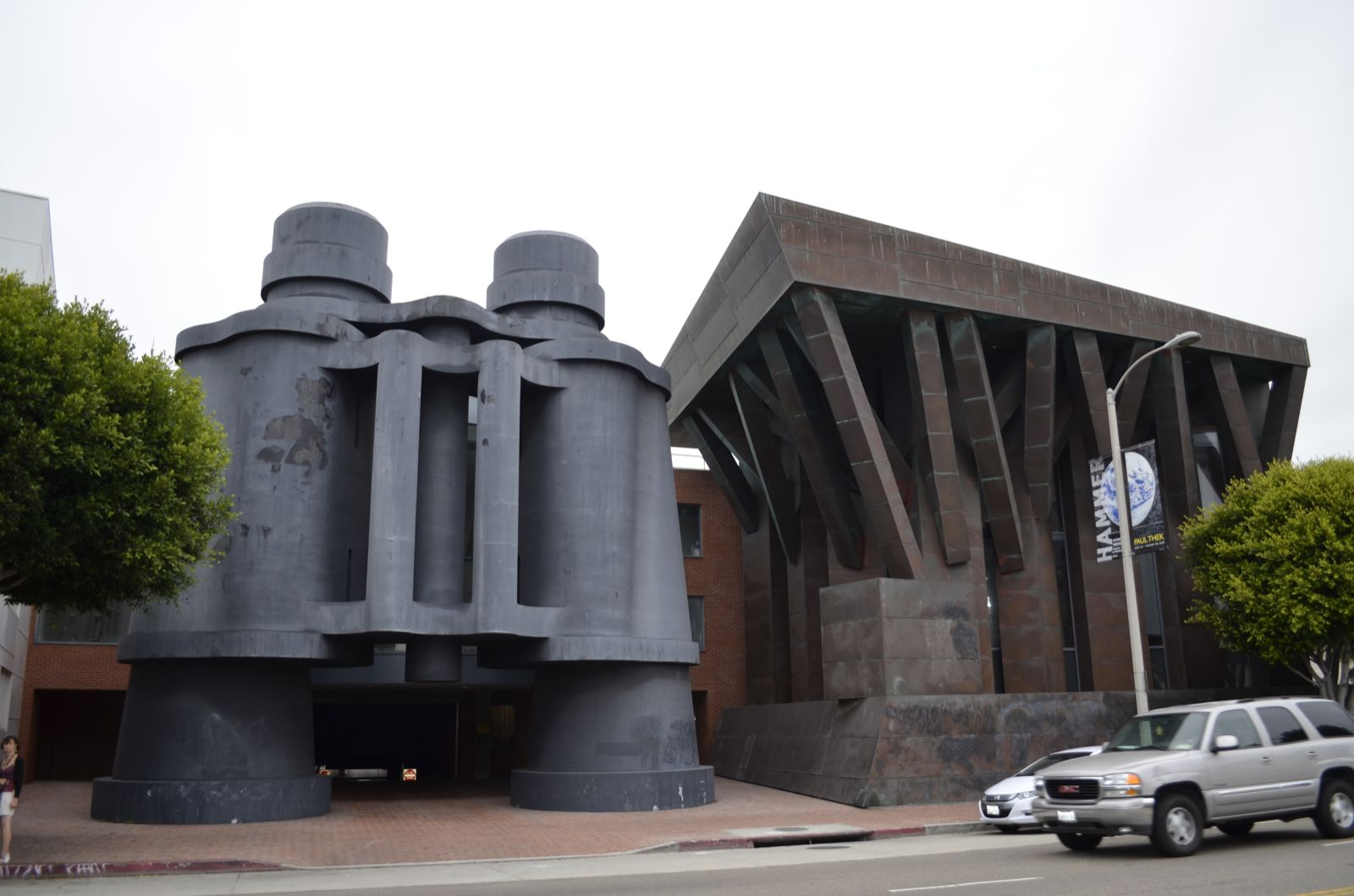
The Chiat/Day Building (1991), by Frank Gehry, in Venice, California.

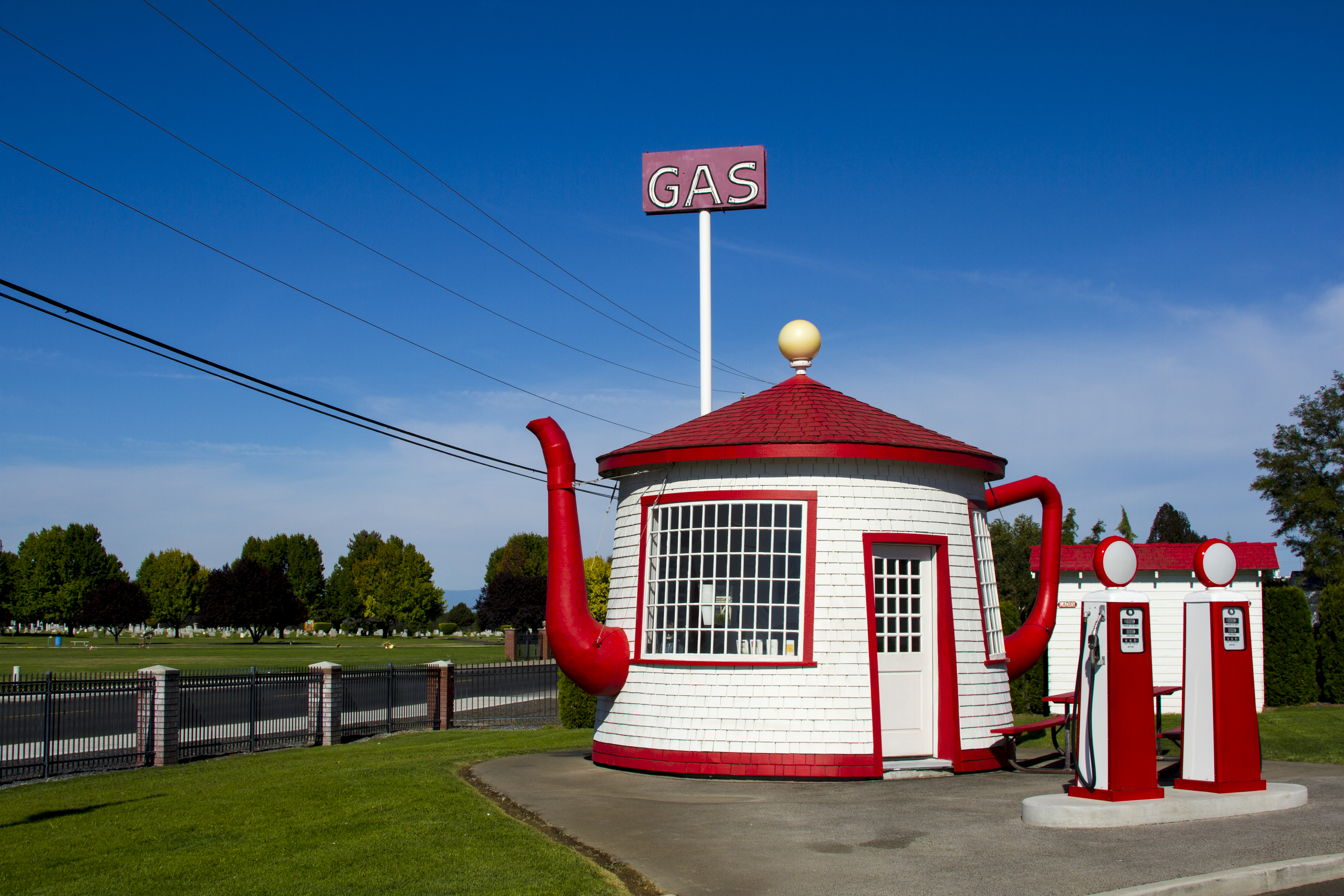
Teapot Dome Service Station in Zillah, Washington.

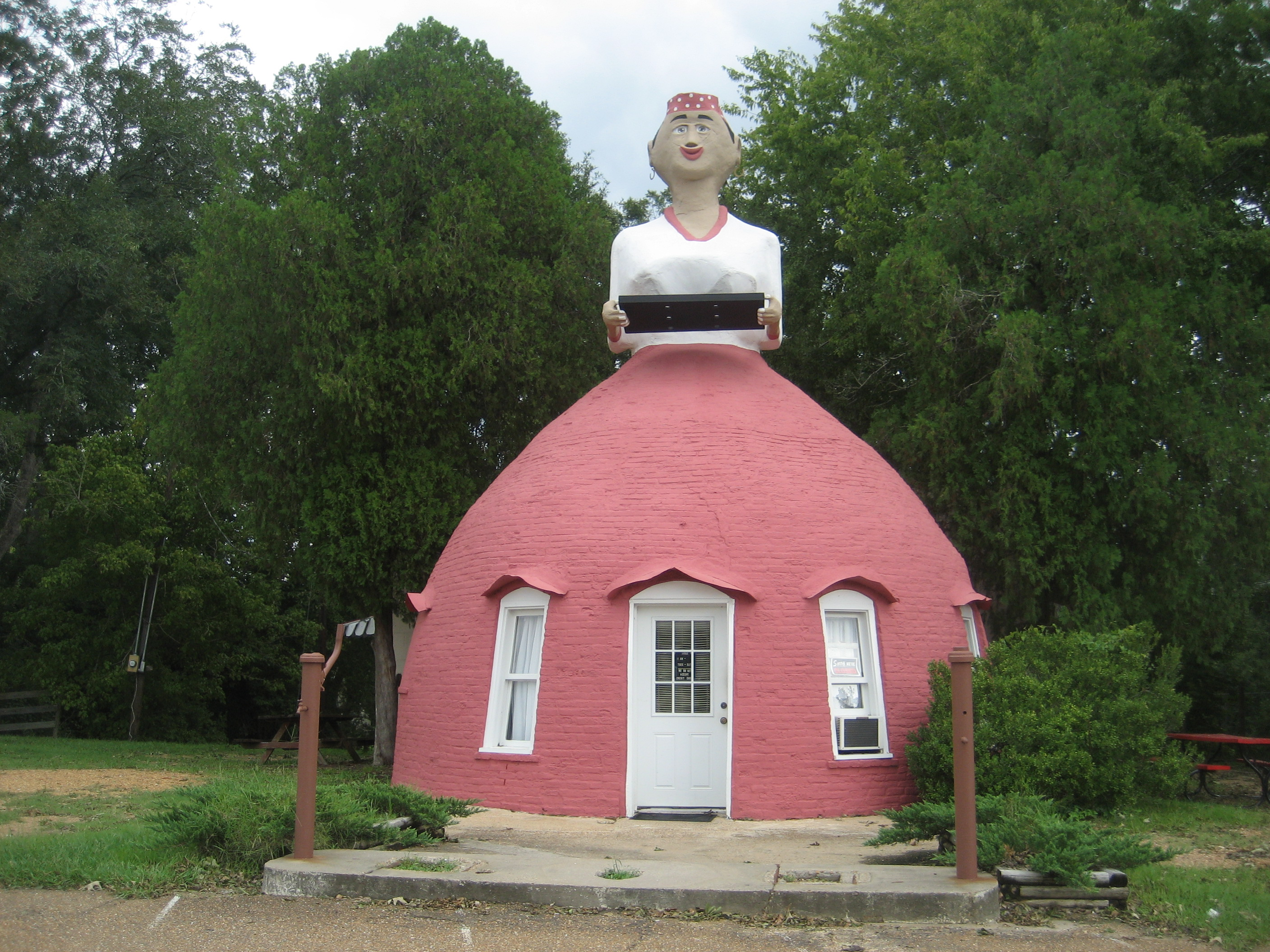
"Mammy's Cupboard" restaurant, Adams County, Mississippi (1940)

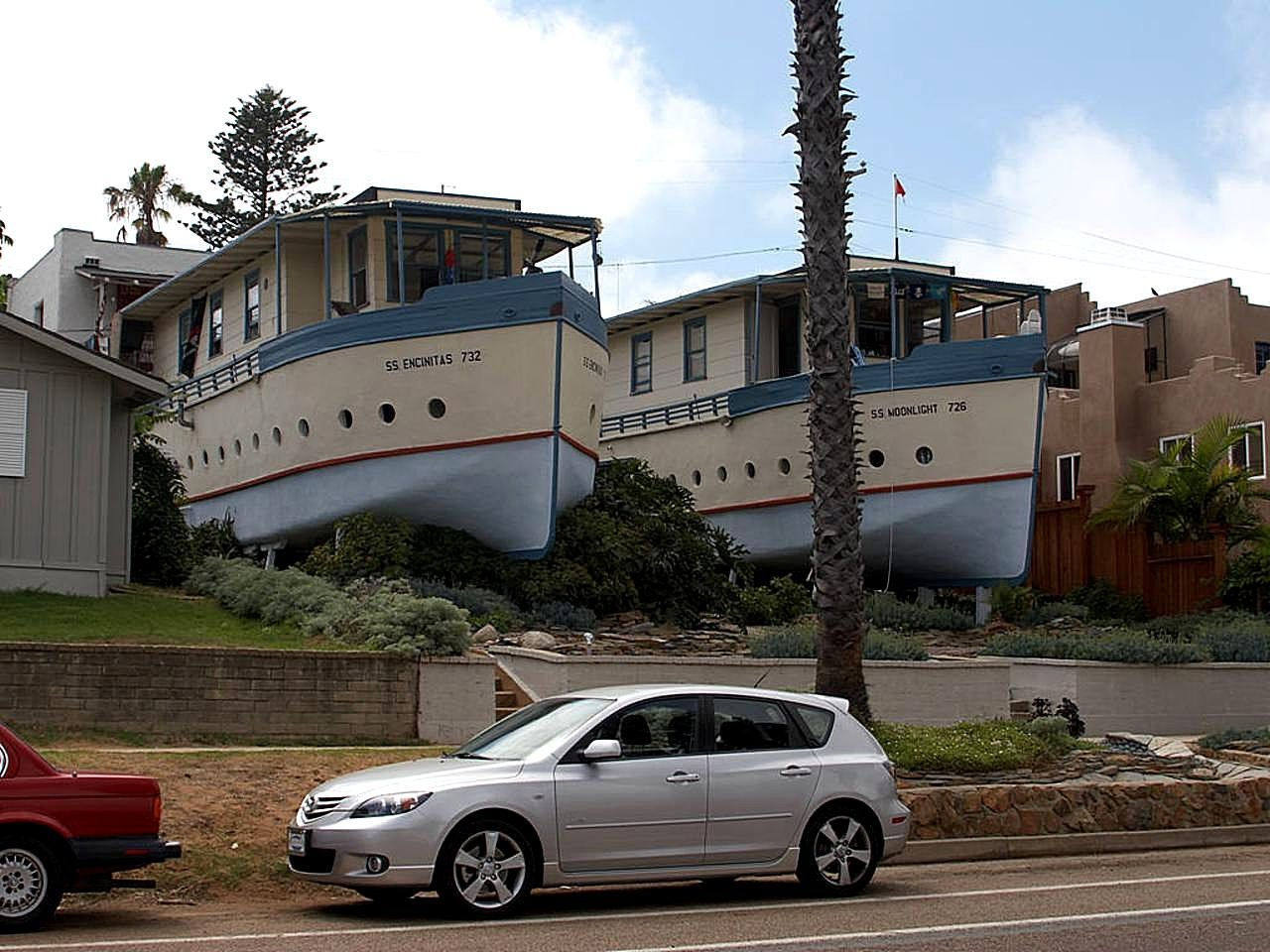
Encinitas Boathouses, Encinitas, California

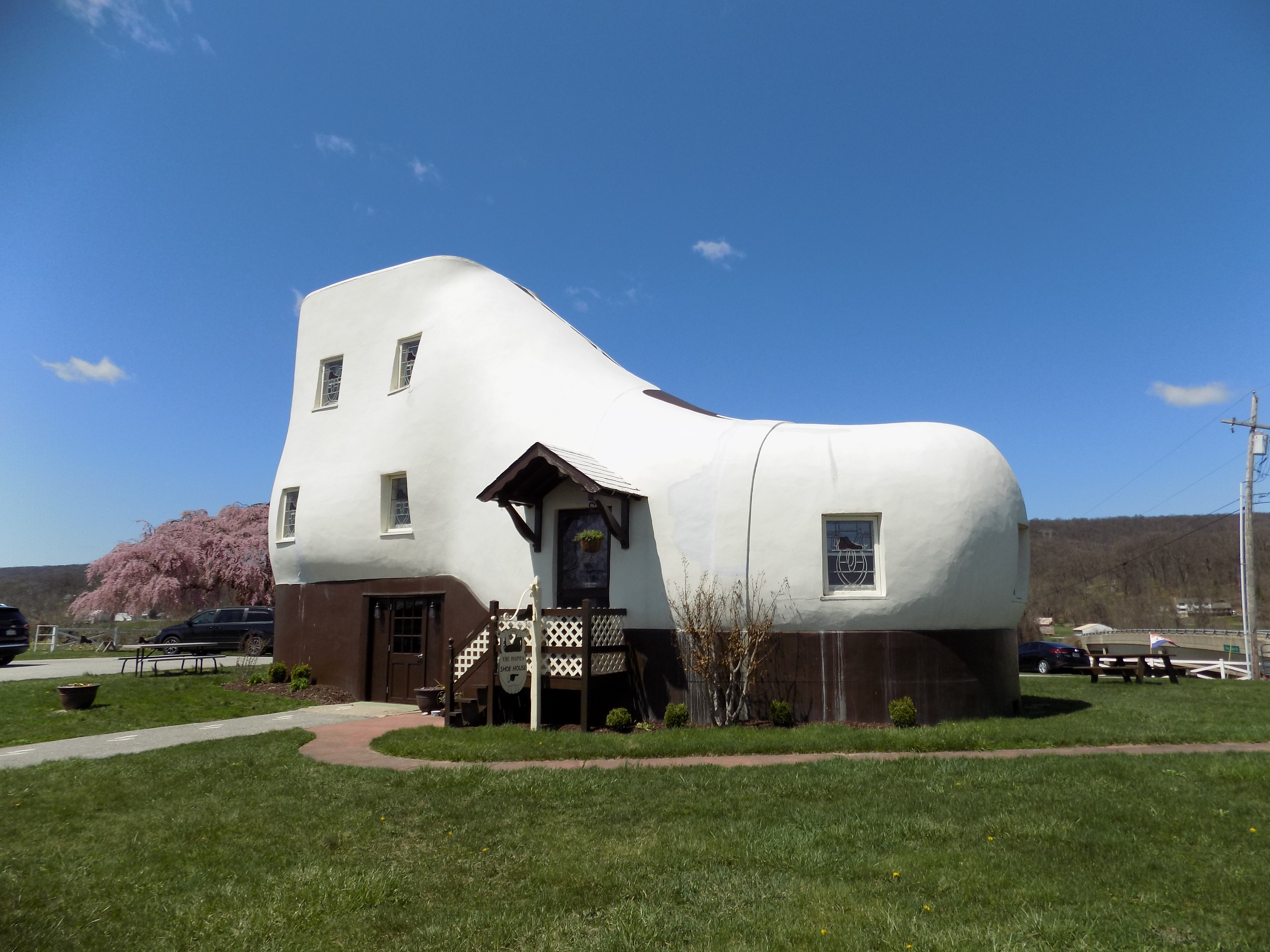
Haines Shoe House in Hellam Township, Pennsylvania

=== Statues ===
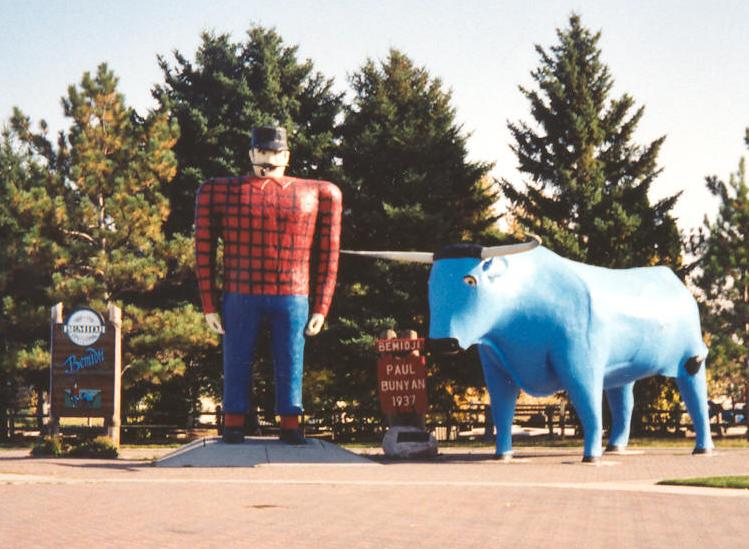
Paul Bunyan and Babe the Blue Ox in Bemidji, Minnesota, US (1936)

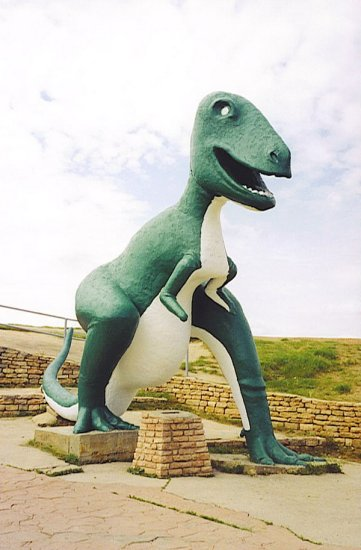
Dinosaur Park sculpture of a Tyrannosaurus rex in Rapid City, South Dakota, US (1936)

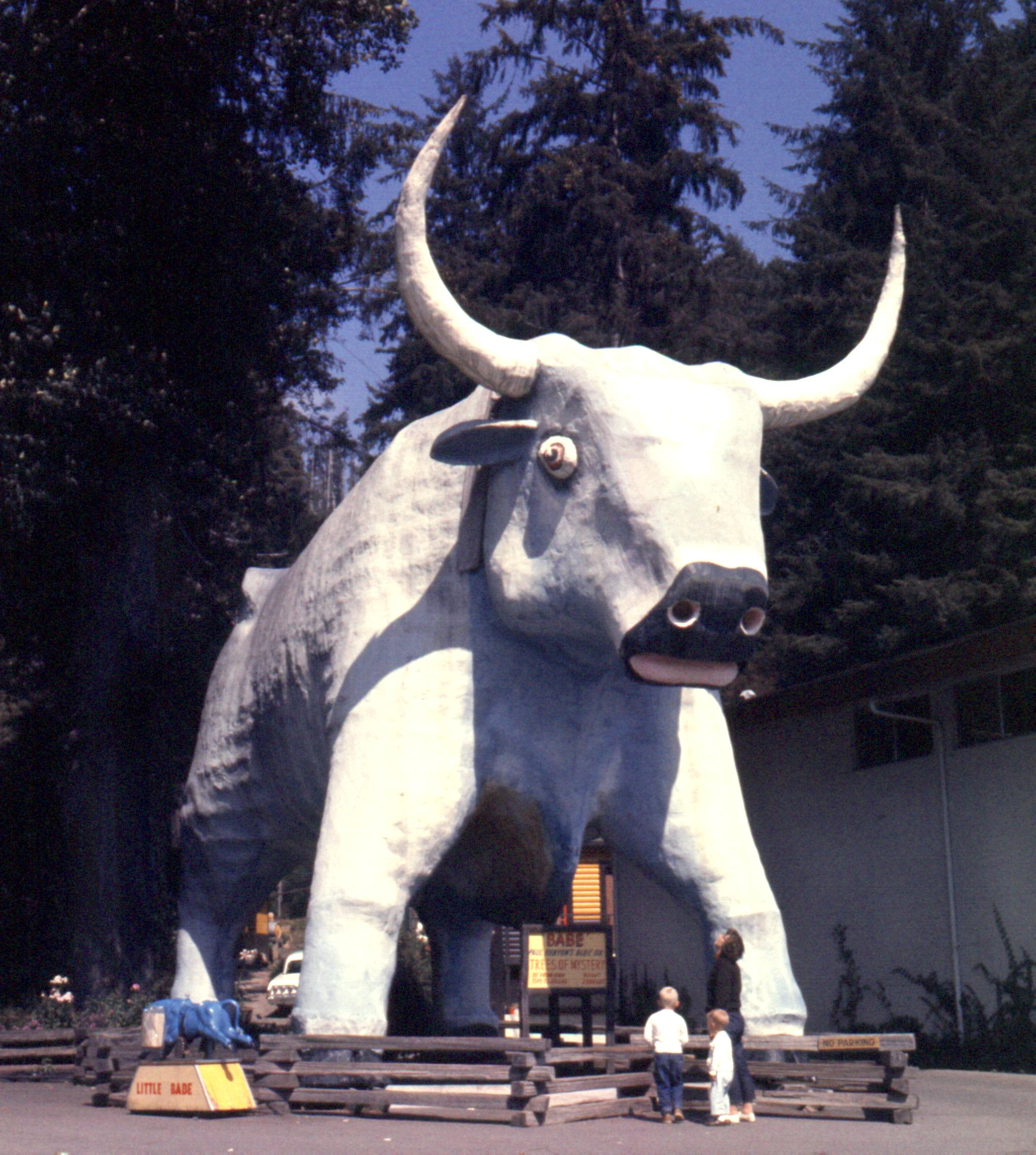
Babe the Blue Ox at Trees of Mystery in Klamath, California, US (1949)

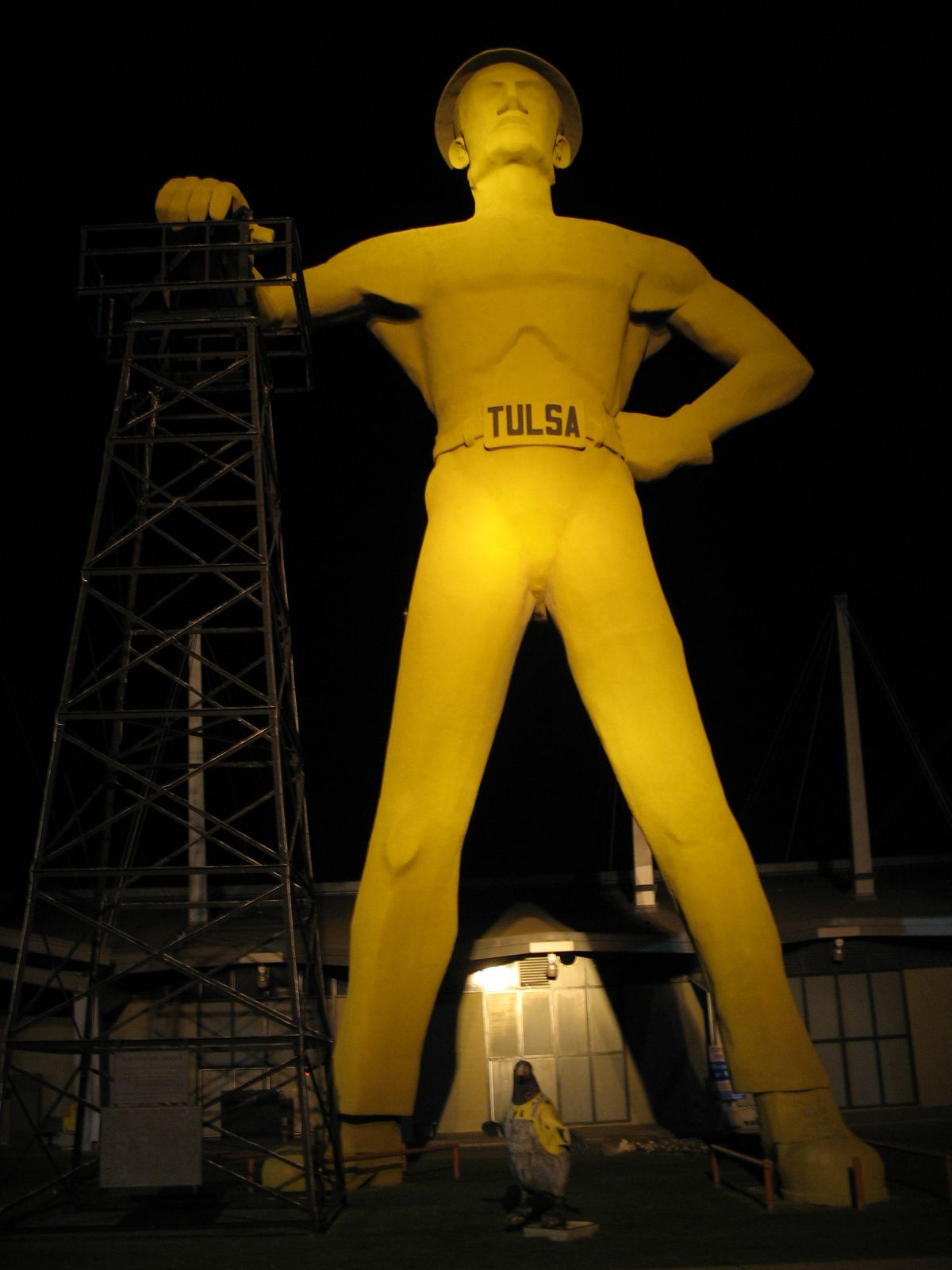
Golden Driller statue in Tulsa, Oklahoma, US (1953)

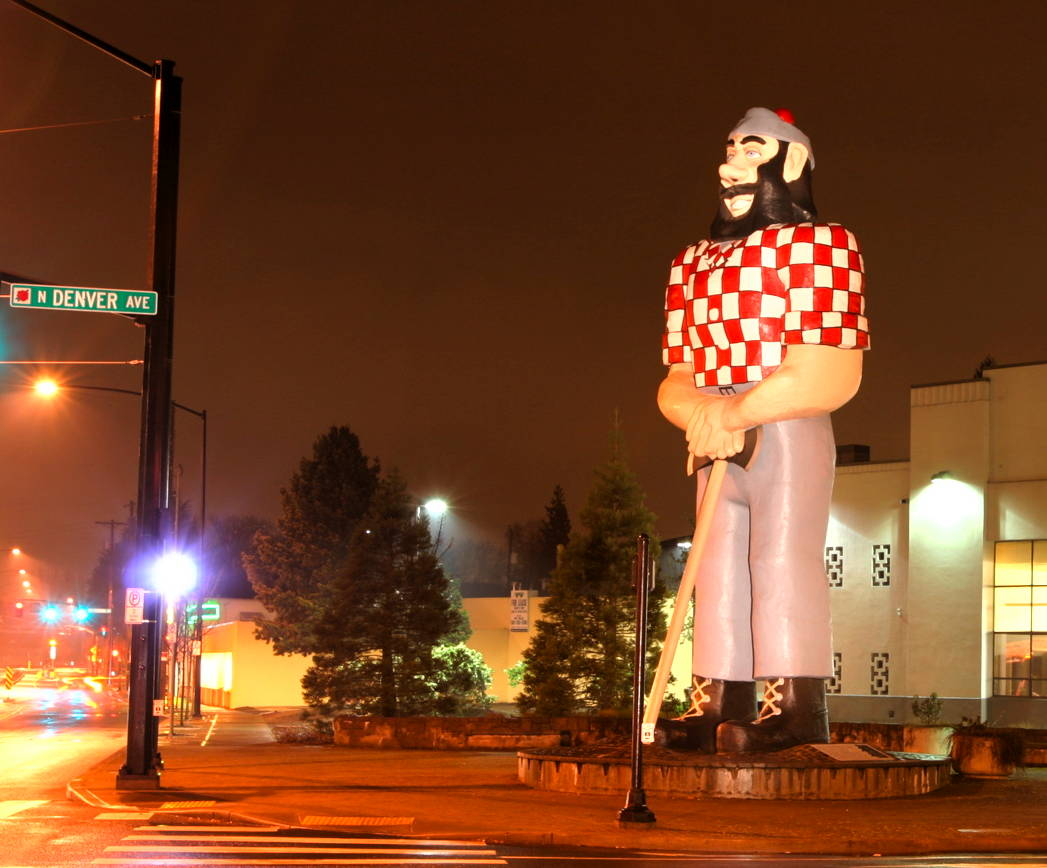
Paul Bunyan statue in Portland, Oregon, US (1959)

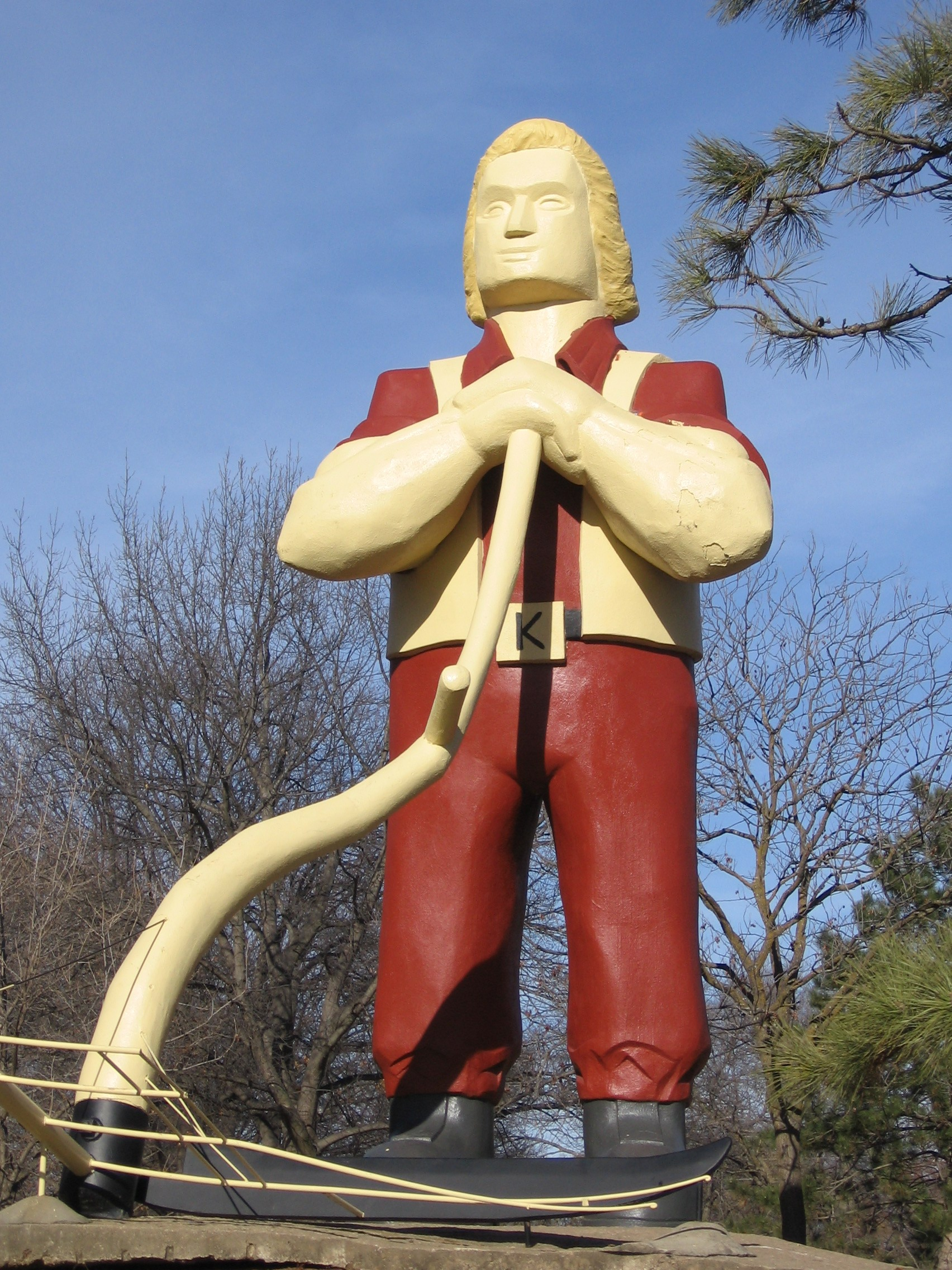
Johnny Kaw statue in Manhattan, Kansas, US (1966)

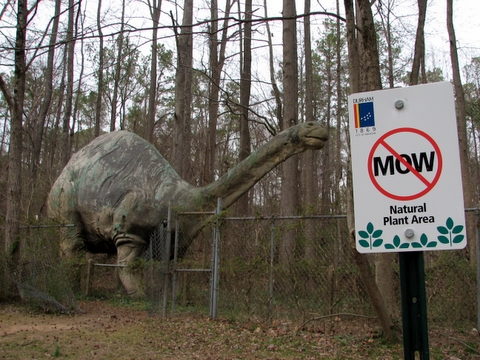
Apatosaurus statue at North Carolina Museum of Life and Science in Durham, North Carolina, US (1967)

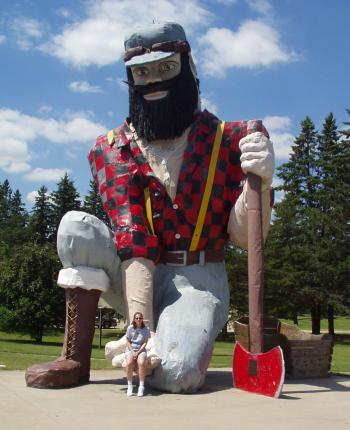
Paul Bunyan statue in Akeley, Minnesota, US

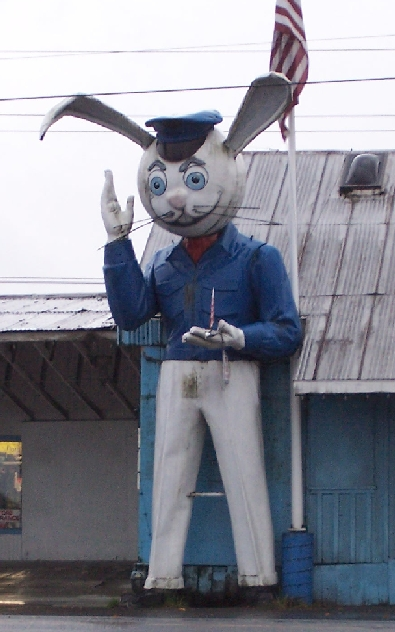
Harvey statue at Harvey Marine in Aloha, Oregon, US

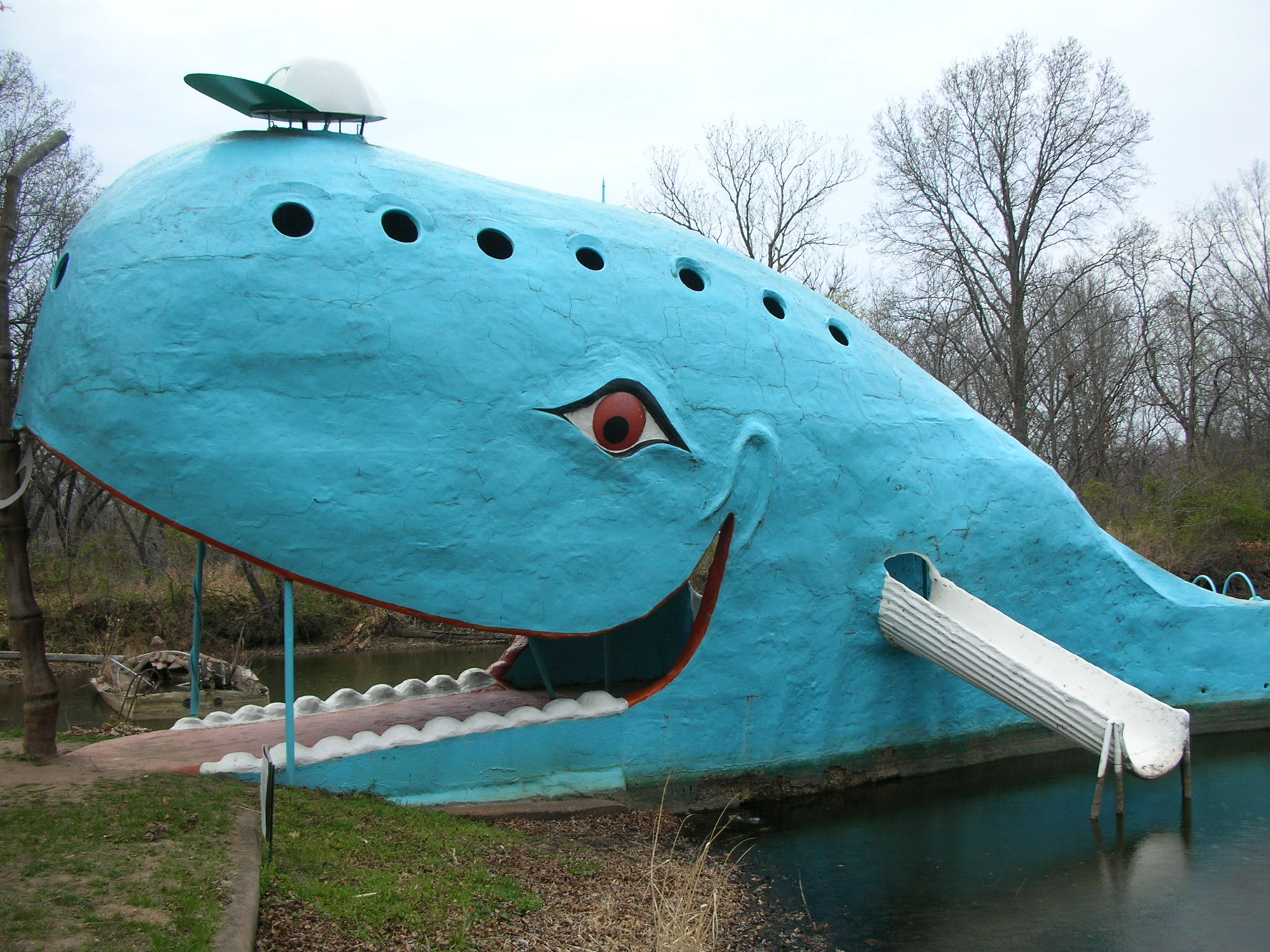
Blue Whale of Catoosa in Catoosa, Oklahoma, US

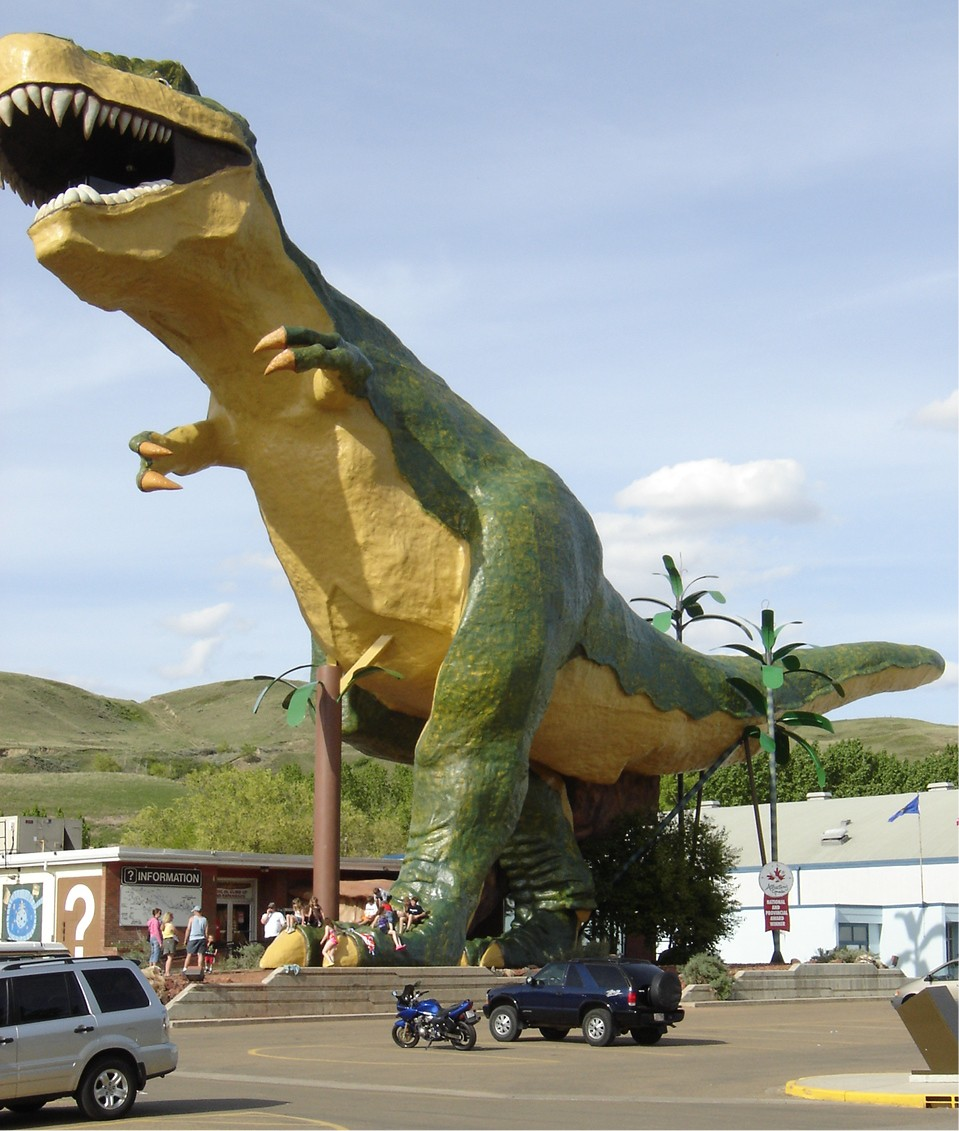
World's Largest Dinosaur in Drumheller, Alberta, Canada (2000)

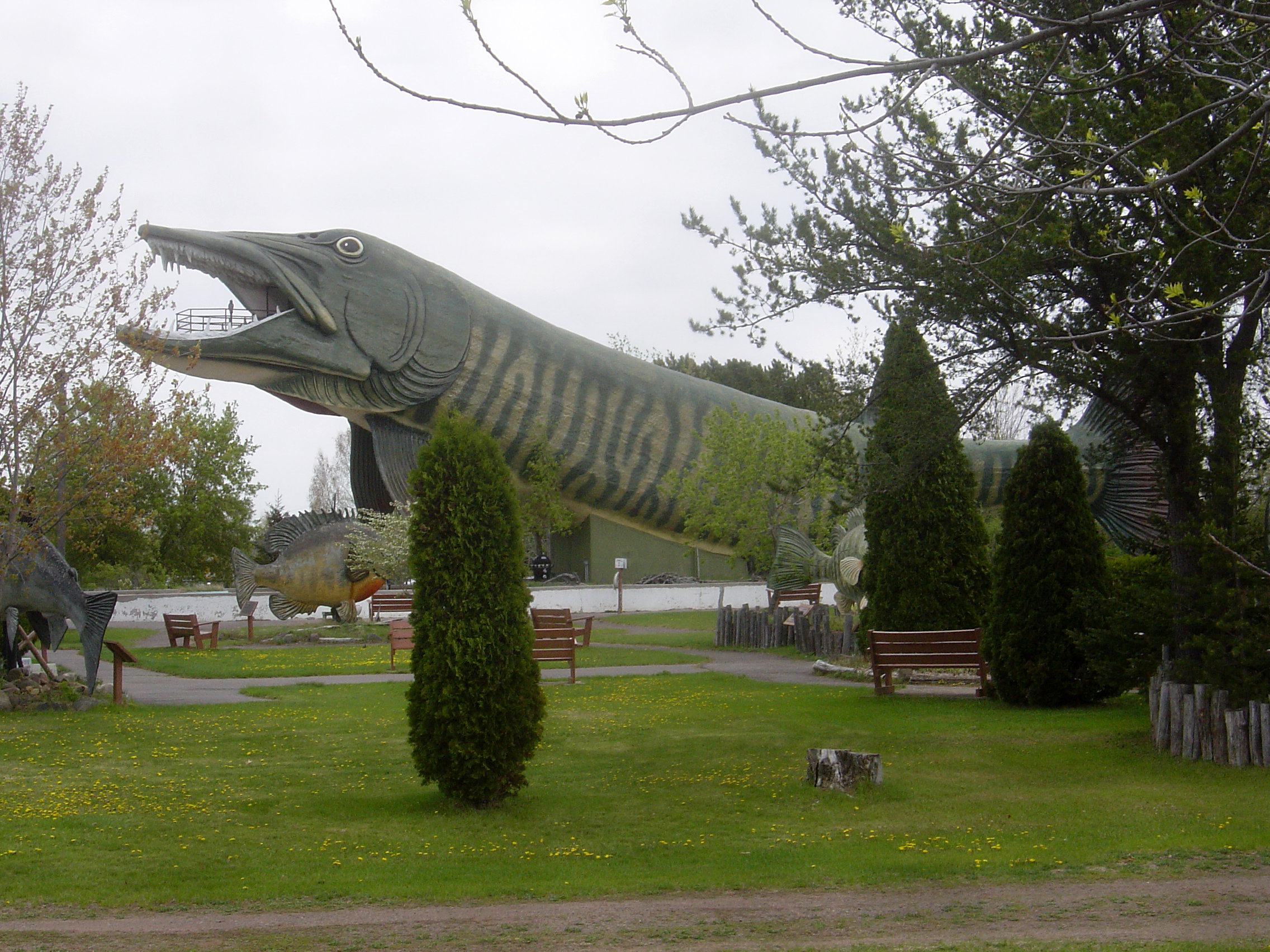
World's Largest Muskellunge in Hayward, Wisconsin, US at the National Freshwater Fishing Hall of Fame.

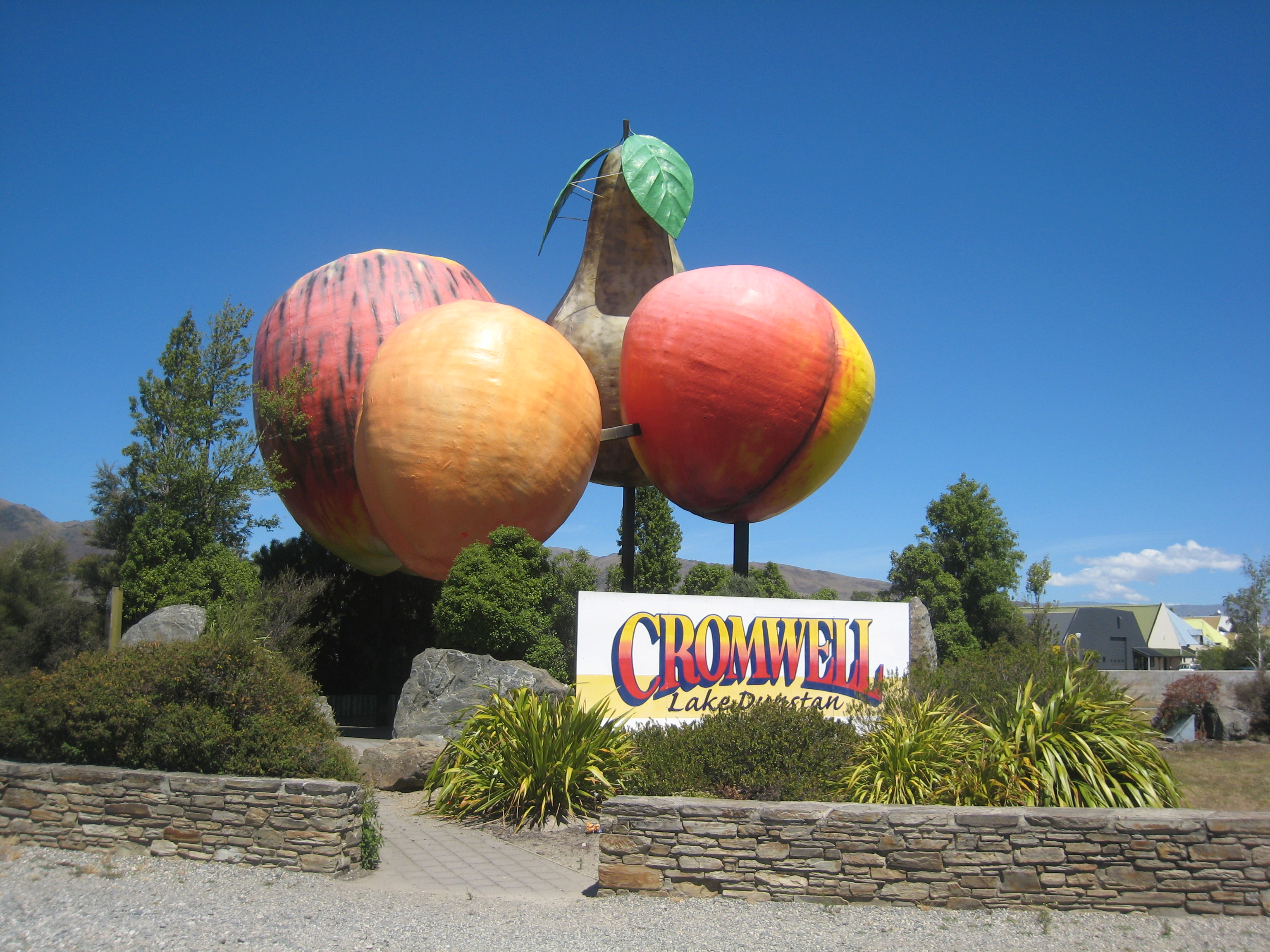
Big fruit outside Cromwell, Central Otago, New Zealand

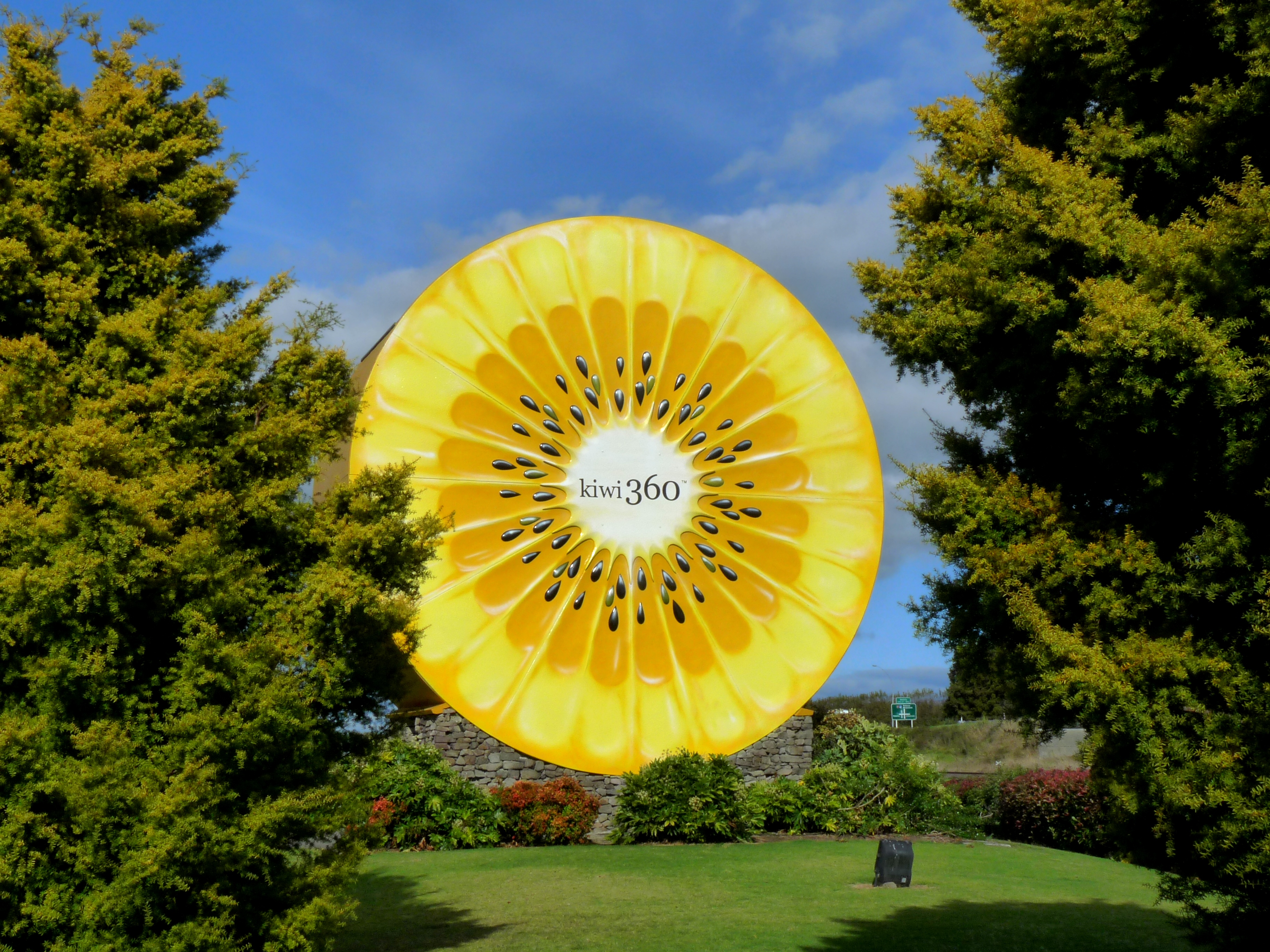
Kiwi fruit in Te Puke, New Zealand

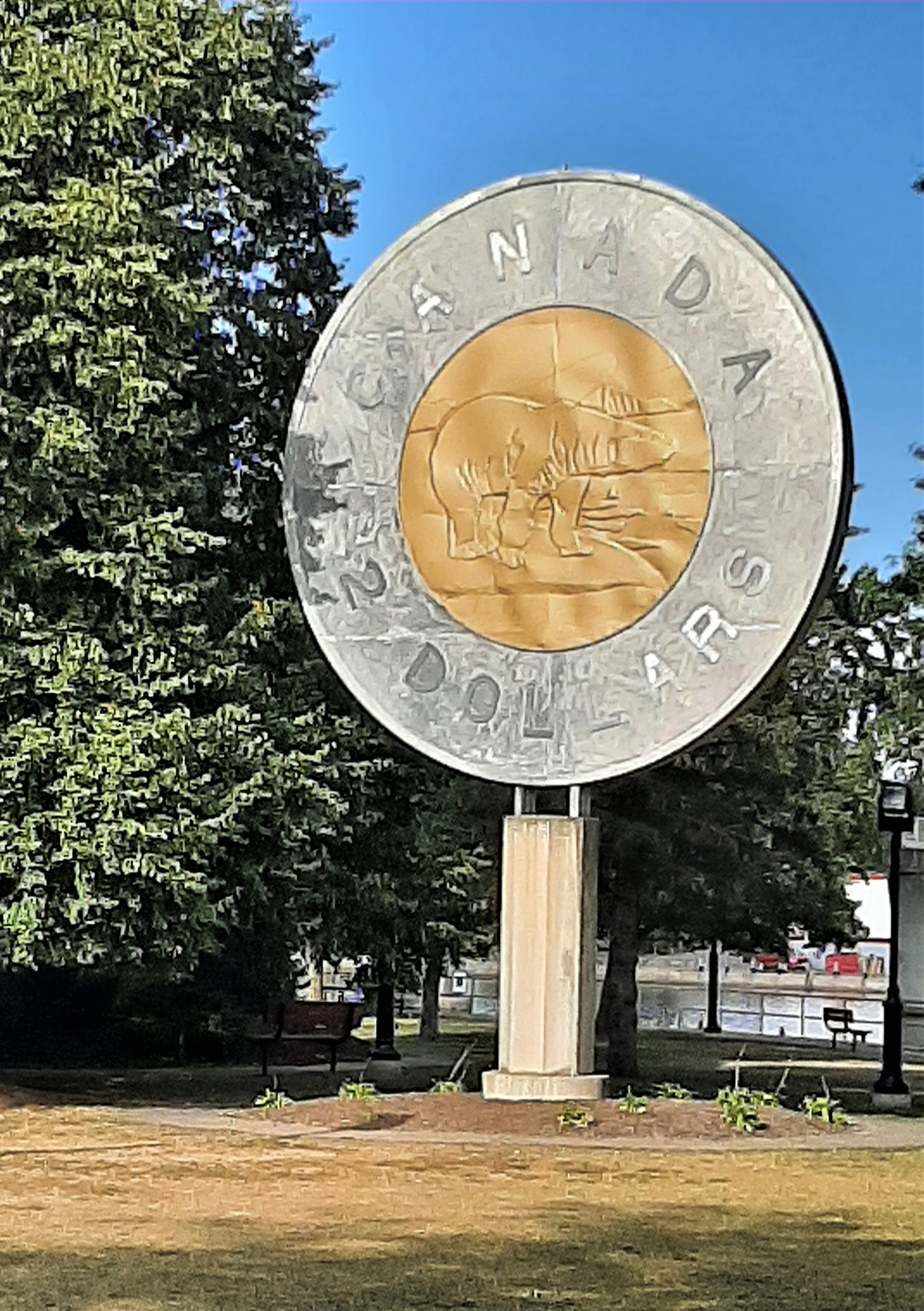
Giant Canadian two-dollar coin Monument, Campbellford, Ontario, Canada

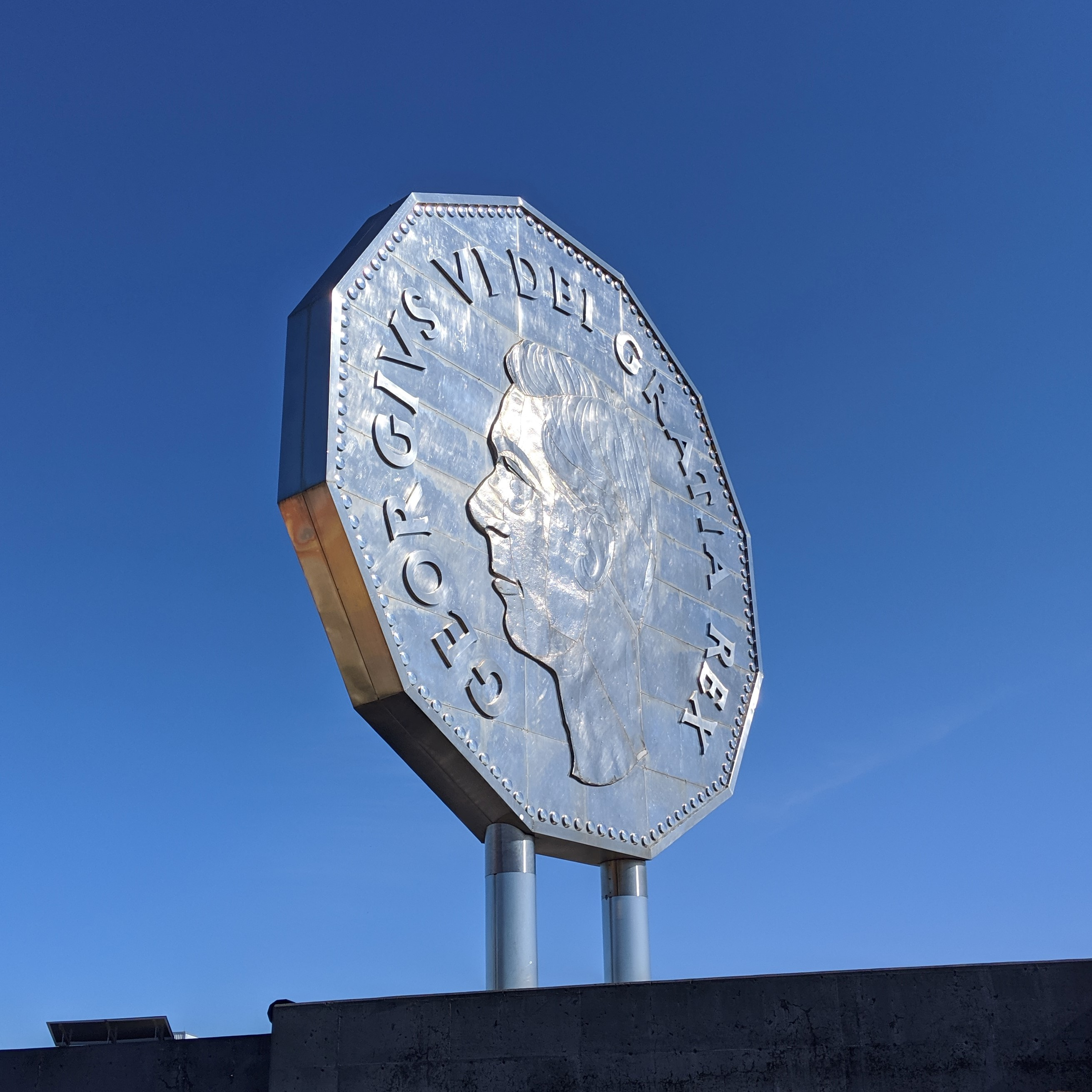
Big Nickel Giant replica of a 1951 Canadian nickel Greater Sudbury, Ontario, Canada

== See also ==
- Australia's big things
- Brandmobile
- Ice hotels, temporary hotels made of ice and snow, found in the coldest regions of the world
- John Margolies, a photographer who specialized in roadside attractions, including novelty architecture
- List of world's largest roadside attractions
- Muffler Men, oversized molded fiberglass sculptures used to promote roadside businesses
- New Zealand's big things
- Giants of the Prairies
