= Bowlin =

Bowlin may refer to:

- Bowlin Stadium, a softball stadium in Lincoln, Nebraska
- Bowlin, West Virginia
- Mount Bowlin in the Queen Maud Mountains, Antarctica
- Bowlin Travel Centers, a chain of roadside convenience stores in the United States

== People with the name Bowlin ==
- James B. Bowlin (1804–1874), American politician
- Loy Allen Bowlin (1909–1995), American artist
- Robert Bowlin (born 1956), American musician
- Shella Bowlin, Cherokee government official and business executive
- Skyler Bowlin (born 1989), American basketball player
- Weldon Bowlin (1940–2019), American baseball player
