= Homer Tate =

American showman (1884–1975)

Homer Martin Tate (1884–1975) was an American nicknamed the "King of Gaffes" for devising strange "artifacts" that were often used in roadside attractions and sideshows to fool and amuse the public. Among his best known works is The Thing.

Tate was born in Poetry, Texas, and moved to Arizona in the 1890s and/or to Gila Valley, Arizona, around 1915. He was a miner and a farmer and also operated a motel and gas station. Tate was elected sheriff of Graham County, serving from 1925 to 1928.

In the late 1930s or '40s, he began to make artifacts from mud, paper and bones, which he sold for small sums. They were passed off by the purchasers as mummies (such as The Thing), mermaids and shrunken heads. Some of his items were purchased by Mike Wolfe in an episode of the television series American Pickers.
