= The Thing (roadside attraction) =

Arizona roadside attraction

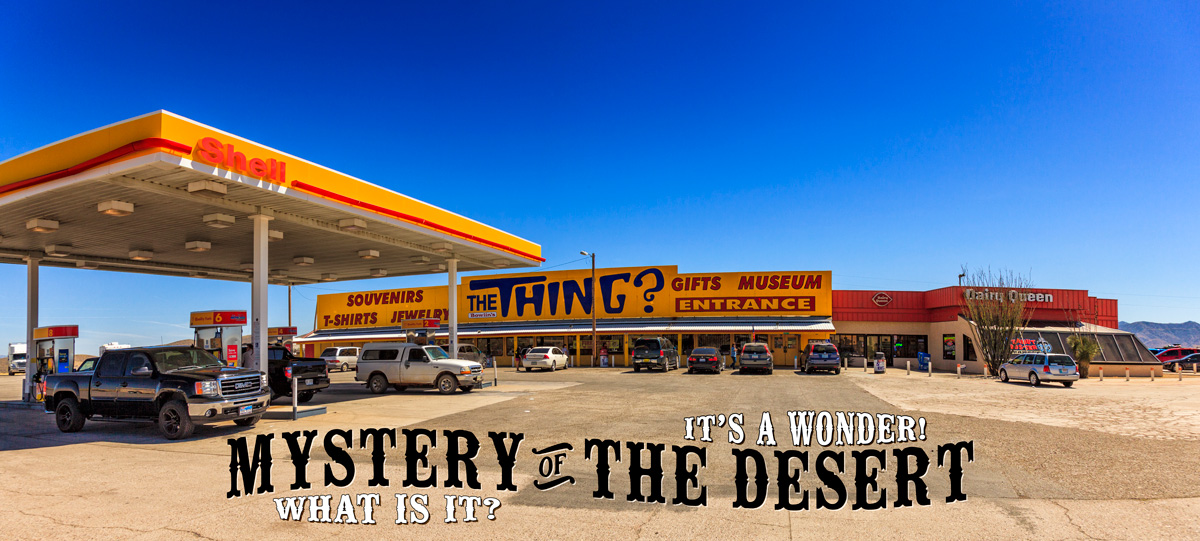
"The Thing?" Roadside Attraction

The Thing (a.k.a. The Thing Museum) is an Arizona roadside attraction extensively advertised by signs along Interstate 10 between El Paso, Texas, and Tucson, Arizona. The object, supposedly a mummified mother and child, is believed to have been made by exhibit creator Homer Tate for sideshows.

The Thing was purchased by former lawyer Thomas Binkley Prince in the mid-twentieth century, who quickly based a tourist attraction on the strange object. Although Prince died in 1969, the attraction was run by his wife Janet for many years. Today, the site is under the ownership of Bowlin Travel Centers, Inc. Despite its remoteness, the attraction has been popular; it has appeared in several tourist guides, and has been the subject of several news stories and reports.

== Location ==
The Thing is located at 32°05′N 110°03′W just off I-10 at exit 322 on a hilltop between Benson and Willcox, near Texas Canyon, at 2631 North Johnson Road, Dragoon, Arizona.

== The exhibit ==
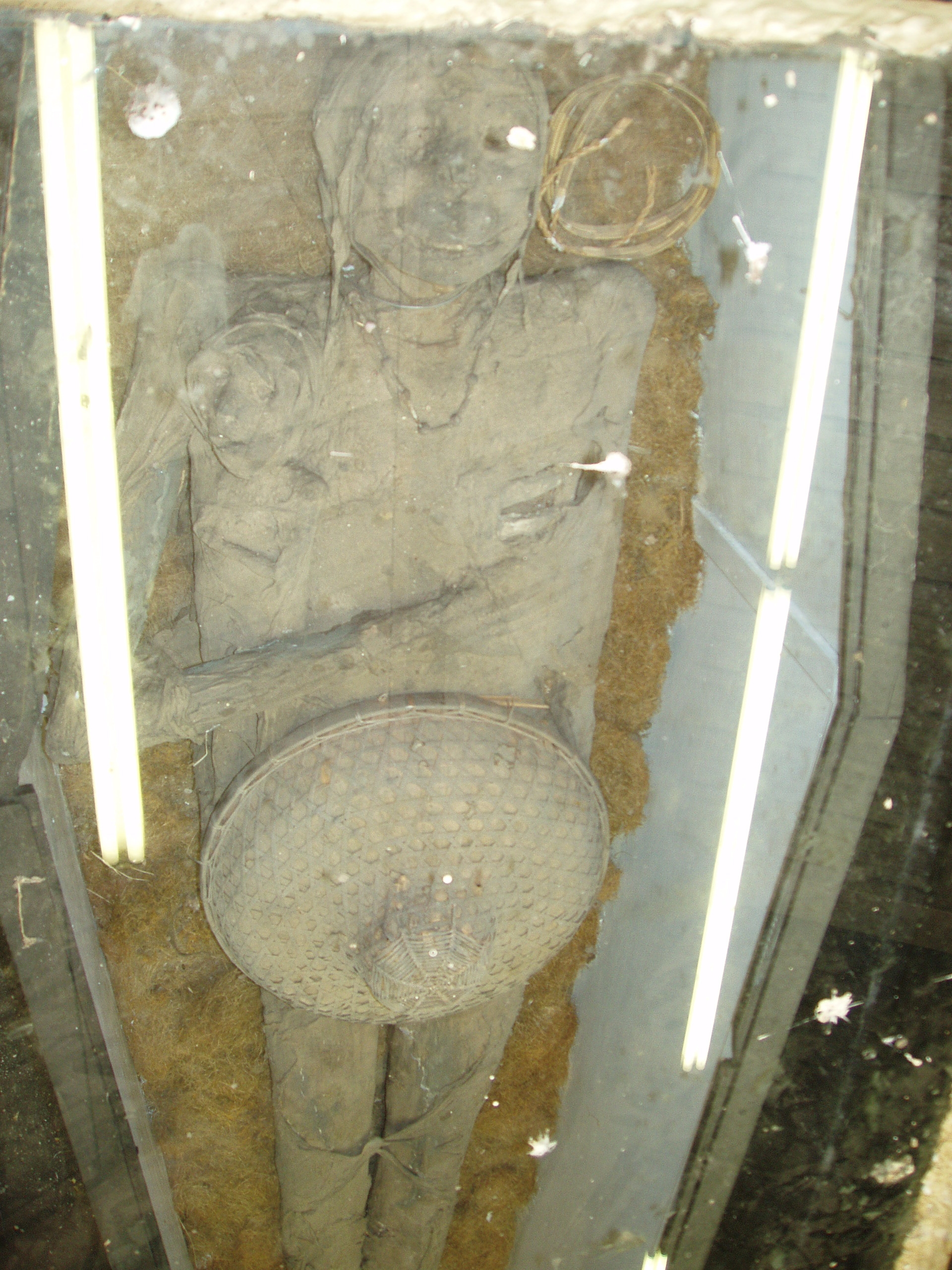
The Thing

[Note - recent renovations as of July 2026 make many of the descriptions below out-of-date. The new exhibit includes life-sized models of aliens and dinosaurs, as well as an elaborate narrative posted along the exhibit suggesting that "The Thing" exhibited at the end of the exhibit is in fact a mummified space alien. Staff reports that further improvements are planned, including animatronics.]

Inside the exhibit are a variety of items, including odd wood carvings of tortured souls by woodcarver Ralph Gallagher, the "Wooden Fantasy" of painted driftwood purchased from an Alamogordo, New Mexico collector, framed 1880s to early 1900s lithographs, historic engraved saddles, guns and rifles of historic Western significance, a Conestoga wagon from Oklahoma!, a buggy without a horse, and a vintage American automobile from the 1930s. A sign by a 1937 Rolls-Royce mentions that it may have been used by Winston Churchill, a change from the previous supposition that it was used by Adolf Hitler. Winding corridors and exhibit halls with painted monster footprints on the floors eventually lead to the "Thing", a mummified, likely female "Mother" of possibly Chinese or Native American descent who died in the 1880s to early 1900s, and a mummified "Child" age and descent unknown but implied to be the son or daughter of the "Mother". They are presented in separate but closely linked displays, coffin, and small coffin, bedding, and scratched plexiglass covering. One story as to the origin of the "Thing" is that the "Mother" and "Child" were illegal border crossers who were found and slaughtered by unknown cowboy bandits during a shootout and found decades later as mummified bodies by a rancher in the area who sold them to the owner/originator of the "Thing". But in this story, the harshness of the truth will never be uncovered, and the "Thing" will remain a mystery.

In August 2018, the Bowlin Travel Centers unveiled a new, modern museum building and other updates to house, in some order or theme, most of the items formerly stored in the three sheds. The new owners have also added a new alien and dinosaur theme that visitors first encounter upon entering the museum. In addition to the upgrades, the cost of admission has increased to $5 per person or $10 per family.

== Origins ==
The step-great-great-grandson of Homer Tate and the curator of the Arizona Historical Society-Pioneer Museum in Flagstaff has said that this was created by Homer Tate. Tate was famous for producing sideshow gaffes. Based out of Phoenix, Tate produced a variety of curiosities like faux shrunken heads.

The roadside area was the creation of attorney Thomas Binkley Prince, who was born in Texas in 1913. Prince attended Arizona State University and became a lawyer, practicing law for a time in Phoenix, Arizona. But soon he and his wife Janet moved to the Mojave Desert on Highway 91 and opened their first Thing roadside attraction and curio shop, between Barstow and Baker. However, the expansion of the road into an interstate highway brought about the loss of the building, and in 1965 the Prince family packed up The Thing and moved to the current location in Arizona. Prince chose the location to be near Texas Canyon, a site that he had become "enchanted" with. A heart condition and several strokes led to Prince's death in 1969 at the age of 56. Janet ran the attraction for several years, but eventually relocated to Baltimore.

The origin of The Thing was established by syndicated columnist Stan Delaplane, who interviewed Janet Prince in 1956. Prince told him, "[A] man came through here about six years ago. He had three of [the bodies] he got somewhere. He was selling them for $50." Today, the attraction is operated by an Albuquerque-based company, Bowlins, Inc., which owns several roadside trading posts throughout the Southwest.

== Advertisement and popularity ==
The Thing is heavily advertised via billboards that dot the interstate. A popular, albeit untrue, legend states that the billboards stretch from New Orleans to Los Angeles. Mike Bowlin, the owner of the site in 1993, noted that the billboards realistically "start around El Paso to the east and somewhere on I-10 between Phoenix and Tucson to the west." RoadsideAmerica.com claims that over 247 billboards, spread out over a span of 200 miles, advertise the attraction. Due to The Thing's popularity, it has appeared in many books, such as Doug Kirby's New Roadside America (1992), and Weird Arizona (2007), and it once was featured in a Jane Pauley television special on NBC. It is referenced in the song "The Church of Logic Sin and Love" (1992), by The Men. The Thing is featured in the 2009 documentary film Amy Cook: The Spaces in Between that traces the creative journey of Austin singer-songwriter Amy Cook and her band as they tour the backwater towns of the American southwest. The Thing is also prominently featured in a scene from the film Palmer's Pick-Up (1999).
