= Lorraine Malach =

Canadian ceramic artist and muralist

Josephine Lorraine Malach (March 23, 1933 – March 3, 2003) was a Canadian ceramic artist, ceramic muralist and painter.

== Personal history ==
She was born at Regina, Saskatchewan in 1933, the only child of Stan and Beth Malach. She was educated at Sacred Heart Academy and the School of Art, both in Regina. At the urging of her instructors at the School of Art she took further study in Philadelphia at Barnes Foundation and Pennsylvania Academy of Fine Arts. She studied in Europe on several Study Tour Awards.

== Body of work ==
Her works, include ceramic panels, paintings, and murals that are displayed in many churches, schools, public buildings and are held in private collections including in the Vatican. She carefully planned and researched each commission, often requiring a number of years work. She worked over two years on the ceramic mural created for the Royal Tyrell Museum in Drumheller. Malach took her vocation seriously and had a work ethic that enabled her to create many lasting works. "...she made art everyday of her life, and hardly anyone else did. She was constantly seeking to say something and do something."

=== The Story of Life ===
Her final and one of her most remarkable works is The Story of Life. It is a ceramic mural created for the Royal Tyrrell Museum of Palaeontology, Drumheller, Alberta, Canada. The mural consists of ten panels, each four feet wide and eight feet high; ten tons of clay were used. It depicts life forms from the Precambrian to the Cretaceous, as told by human-based figures.

== Death ==
Lorraine Malach died on March 3, 2003, at Drumheller, Alberta, at age 69 and before the completion of the work. Her friends and colleagues undertook to complete the work. The two remaining pieces were fired in a kiln and the mural was completed by Janet Grabner.

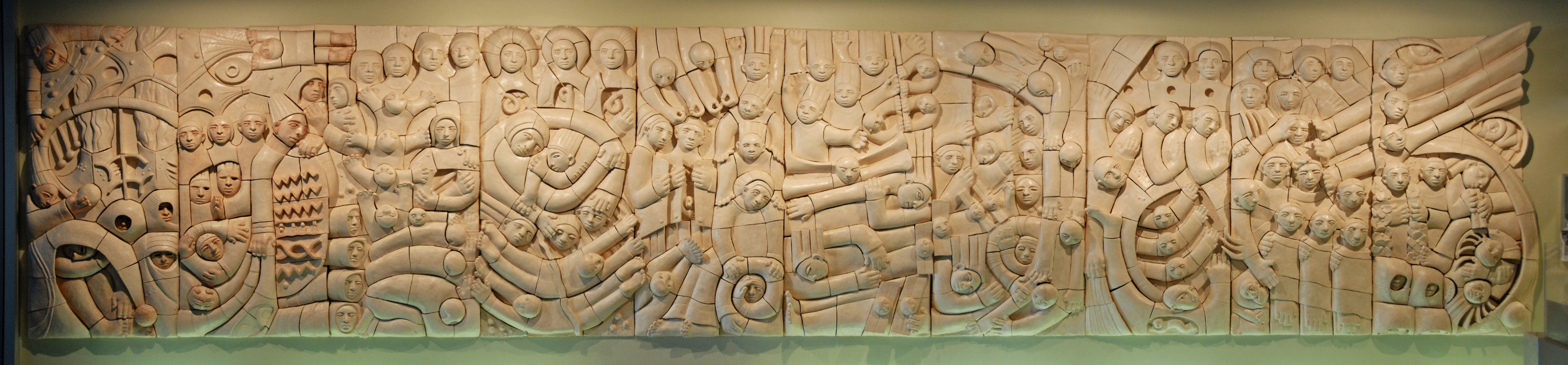
Full view of the mural as a linear panorama in the Royal Tyrrell Museum

== See also ==
- List of Canadian artists
