= World's Largest Dinosaur =

Canadian roadside tourist attraction

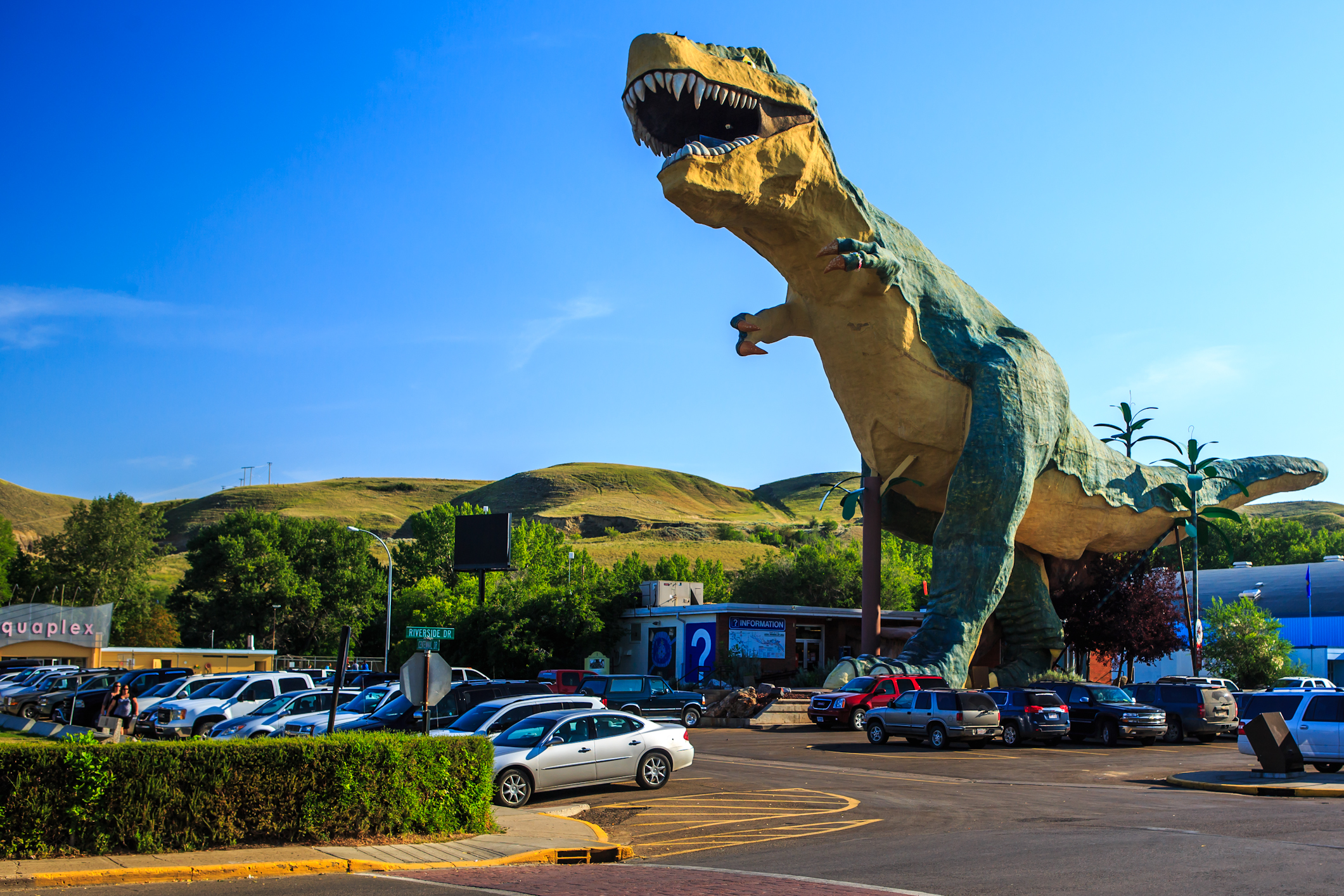
- World's Largest Dinosaur in 2012
- Interactive map of World's Largest Dinosaur
- Location: 60 1 Avenue, Drumheller, Alberta, Canada
- Coordinates: 51.467246°N 112.708805°W
- Material: fiberglass and steel
- Length: 46 metres (151 ft)
- Height: 26.3 metres (86 ft)
- Weight: 66,000 kilograms (146,000 lb)
- Dedicated date: October 13, 2000
- Website: worldslargestdinosaur.com

The "World's Largest Dinosaur", nicknamed "Tyra", is a roadside tourist attraction shaped like a model Tyrannosaurus rex, situated in Drumheller, Alberta, Canada. The World's Largest Dinosaur is one of several dinosaur-related attractions in Drumheller and the surrounding areas, including Dinosaur Provincial Park. World's Largest Dinosaur is set to close in 2029.

== Background ==
The model Tyrannosaurus was constructed of fiberglass and steel, with a height of 26.3 metres (86 ft) and a length of 46 metres (151 ft), considerably larger than the largest known specimens of the actual dinosaur, known as Sue, which reached up to 12.8 m (42 ft) in length, and up to 4 m (13 ft) tall at the hips.

The Tyrannosaurus rex is one of several dinosaur-related attractions in the town of Drumheller, which is located in the Badlands of east-central Alberta along the Red Deer River, approximately 135 kilometres (84 mi) northeast of Calgary. Drumheller is home to the Royal Tyrrell Museum of Palaeontology, housing over 160,000 cataloged fossils and showcasing a collection of approximately 800 fossils as exhibits. The town of Drumheller features numerous pieces of public art in the form of dinosaur models that are placed throughout the community.

== History ==
The World's Largest Dinosaur took approximately three years to complete, which including a design stage, groundbreaking on October 2, 1999, and a grand opening on October 13, 2000. The dinosaur was built during the term of former Drumheller Mayor Phil Bryant. Each month 15 percent of the revenue generated by visitors to the World's Largest Dinosaur and the attached gift shop is directed to the World's Largest Dinosaur Legacy Fund, which reinvests funds into community economic development initiatives. The sculpture weights 145,000 lb (66,000 kg), 65,000 lb (29,000 kg) of which is steel. Visitors climb 106 stairs from the gift shop to the viewing area in the dinosaur's mouth, which is approximately 60 sq ft (5.6 m^{2}) and can hold between 8 and 12 people at a time.

On August 27, 2018, the World's Largest Dinosaur welcomed its two-millionth visitor 18 years after the structure was opened in 2000. In 2020 the World's Largest Dinosaur underwent a CA$300,000 restoration which was partially funded by the Government of Canada through the Canadian Experiences Fund. The restoration will include a new coat of paint on the dinosaur.

On March 26, 2025, the Drumheller Chamber of Commerce announced that the attraction would close and be dismantled in 2029.

== See also ==
- Giants of the Prairies
- Novelty architecture
- List of largest roadside attractions
