= Royal Tyrrell Museum of Palaeontology =

Museum in Drumheller, Alberta, Canada

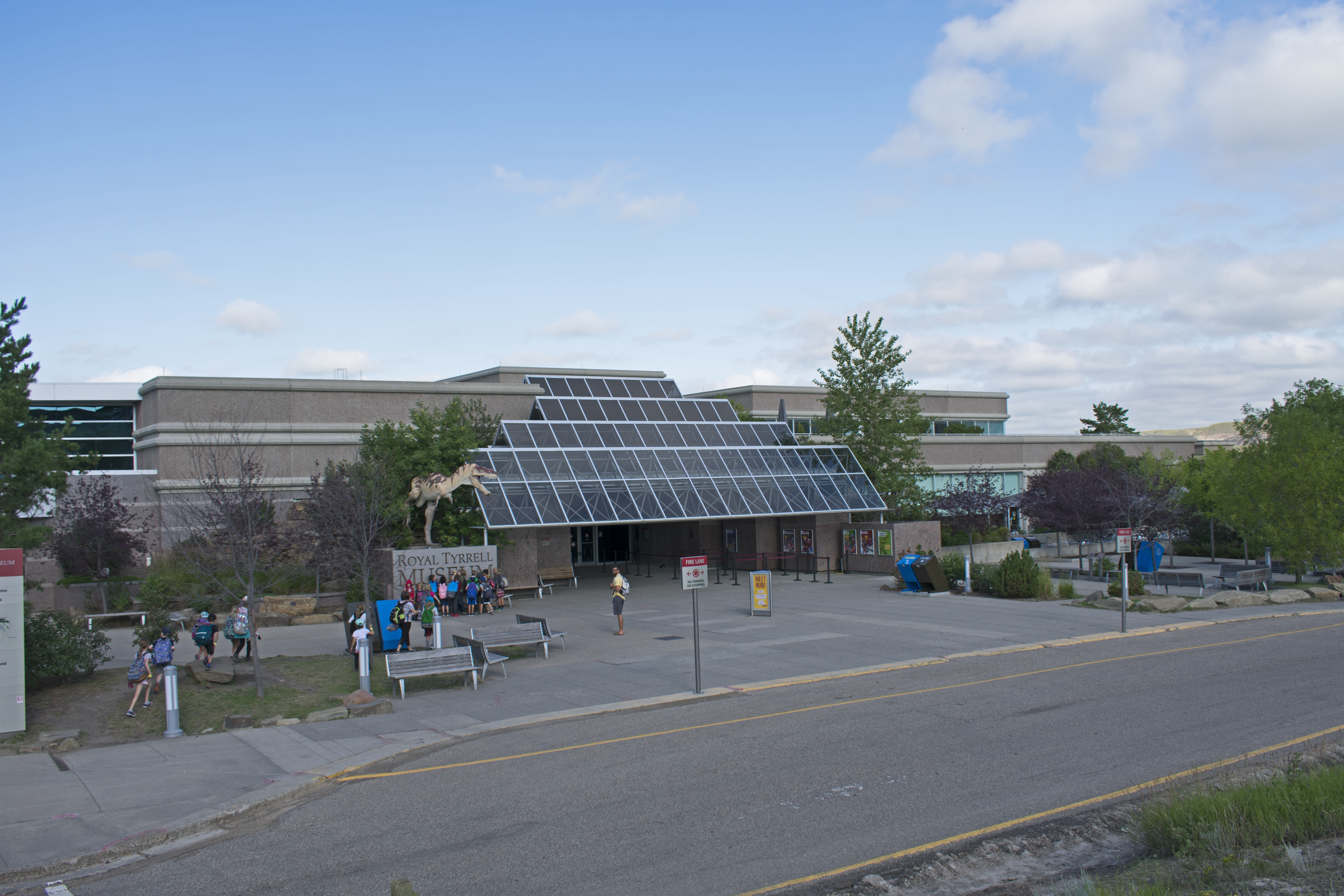
- Entrance to the Royal Tyrrell Museum
- Former name: Tyrrell Museum of Palaeontology (1985–1990)
- Established: 25 September 1985; 41 years ago (Note: The following date was when the museum opened to the public. The museum may trace its origins to the palaeontology program of the Provincial Museum of Alberta, which was spun-off from the provincial museum in 1981 in preparation for a new palaeontology museum.)
- Location: 1500 N Dinosaur Trail, Drumheller, Alberta, Canada
- Coordinates: 51°28′45″N 112°47′24″W
- Type: Palaeontological
- Visitors: 470,000 (2016–17)
- Executive director: Lisa Making
- Architect: BCW Architects
- Owner: Government of Alberta
- Website: tyrrellmuseum.com

The Royal Tyrrell Museum of Palaeontology (RTMP; often referred to as the Royal Tyrrell Museum) is a palaeontology museum and research facility in Drumheller, Alberta, Canada. The museum was named in honour of Joseph Burr Tyrrell, and is situated within a 12,500-square-metre-building (135,000 sq ft) designed by BCW Architects at Midland Provincial Park.

Efforts to establish a palaeontology museum were announced by the provincial government in 1981, with the palaeontology program of the Provincial Museum of Alberta spun-off to help facilitate the creation of a palaeontology museum. After four years of preparation, the Tyrrell Museum of Palaeontology was opened in September 1985. The museum was later renamed the Royal Tyrrell Museum of Palaeontology in June 1990, following its bestowal of the title "royal" from Queen Elizabeth II. The museum's building was expanded twice in the 21st century. The first expansion was designed by BCW Architects, and was completed in 2003; while the second expansion was designed by Kasian Architecture, and was completed in 2019.

The museum's personal collection includes over 160,000 cataloged fossils, consisting of over 350 holotypes, providing the museum with the largest collection of fossils in Canada. The museum displays approximately 800 fossils from its collection in its museum exhibits. In addition to exhibits, the museum's fossil collection are also used by the museum's research program, which carries a mandate to document and analyze geological and palaeontological history.

== History ==
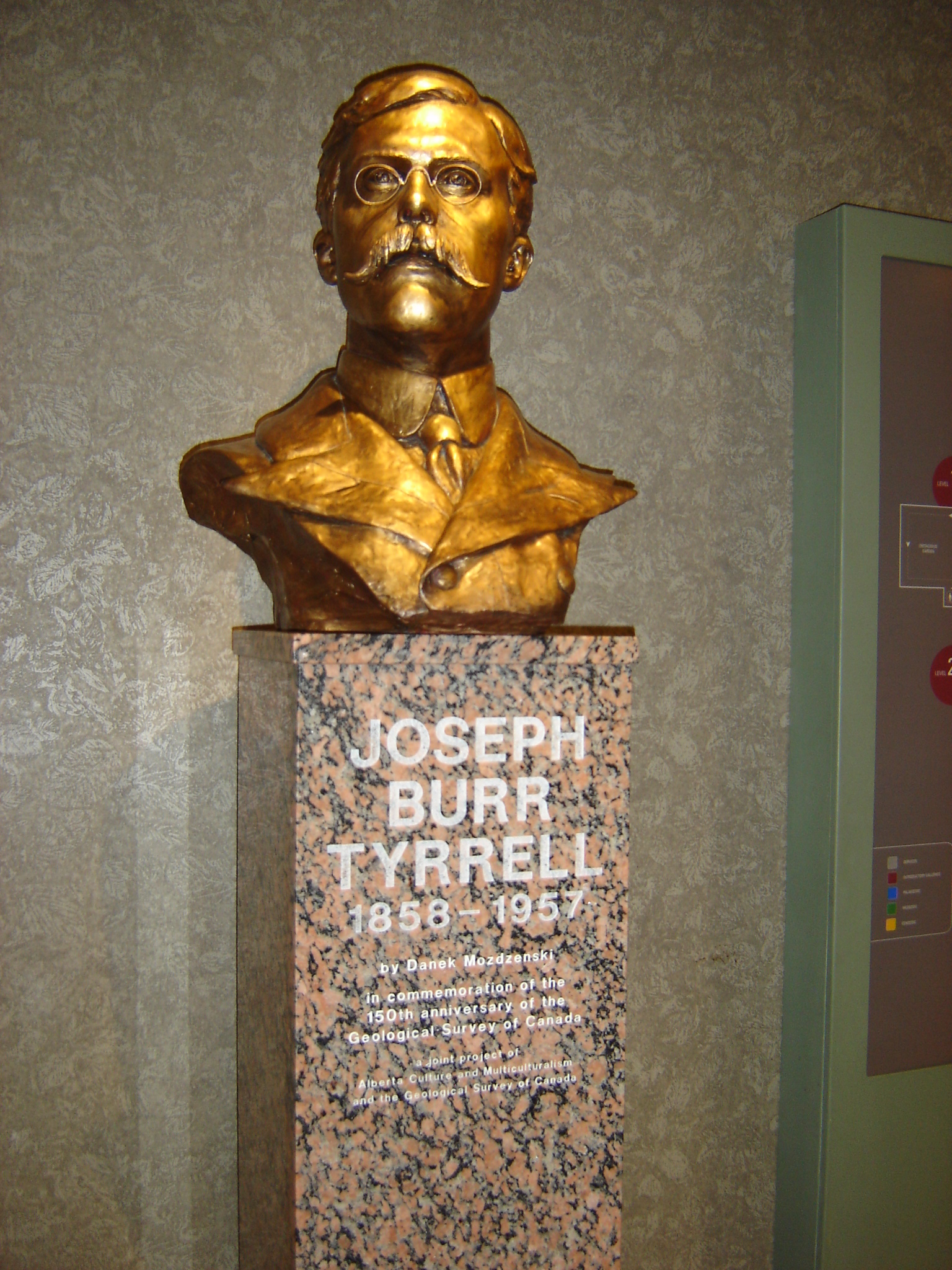
Bust of Joseph Burr Tyrrell in the museum building

During the late 1970s, the government of Alberta began to consider building within, or adjacent to Dinosaur Provincial Park. In 1981, the provincial government formally announced plans to build a palaeontology museum. However, the museum was built in Midland Provincial Park near Drumheller, as opposed to Dinosaur Provincial Park. The construction of the museum formed a part of a larger initiative from premier Peter Lougheed, to establish a network of provincially-operated museums and interpretive centres in select small towns and rural areas throughout Alberta. The provincial government had allocated C$30 million to build the museum. The development of the museum was largely led by the institution's first director, David Baird.

The Provincial Museum of Alberta's palaeontology program, including its collection, and a large portion of its staff, was spun-off in 1981 in preparation for the opening of the new museum. The staff of the future palaeontology museum worked in a temporary office space in downtown Edmonton until 1982, when they were relocated to another temporary office, laboratory, and workshop in Drumheller. Prior to opening, the museum's informal working name was the Palaeontological Museum and Research Institute, although it was changed by Baird to the Tyrrell Museum of Palaeontology, in honour of Joseph Tyrrell, a geologist of the Geological Survey of Canada. Tyrrell accidentally discovered the first reported dinosaur fossil at the Red Deer River valley, while searching for coal seams in 1884.

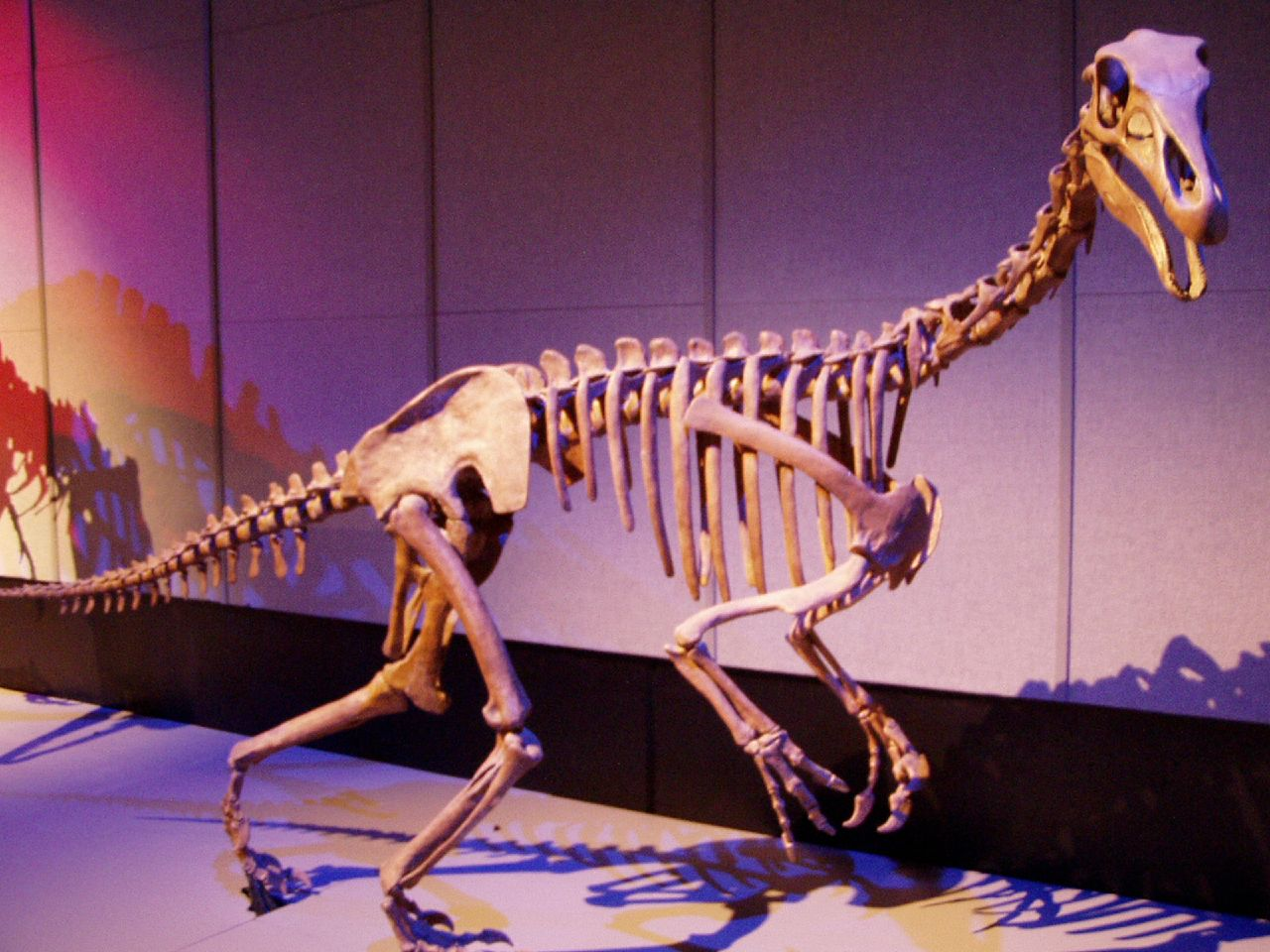
Alxasaurus

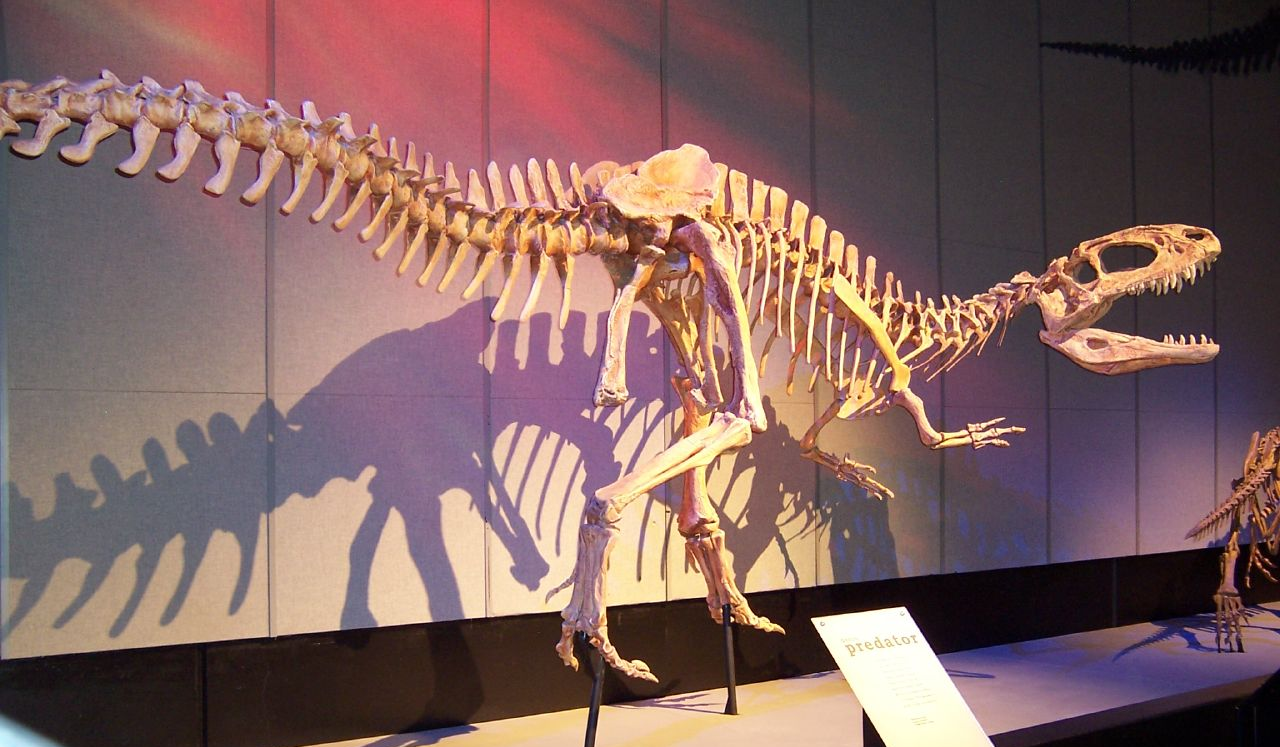
Sinraptor

Skeletal frames on exhibit at the RTMP. The dinosaurs were first identified through the Sino-Canadian Dinosaur Project, a research project co-led by the museum during the mid-1980s to 1990s.

The Tyrrell Museum of Palaeontology was opened to the public on 25 September 1985. In the same year, the museum announced its participation in the China-Canada Dinosaur Project, the institution's first collaborative, out-of-province research project. The collaborative effort marked the first meaningful collaboration between Chinese and western palaeontologists since the Chinese Communist Revolution.

On 28 June 1990, the museum was renamed the Royal Tyrrell Museum of Palaeontology, after it was bestowed the title royal by Queen Elizabeth II. The museum's volunteer support group, the Royal Tyrrell Museum Cooperating Society, was formed in 1993, and helps fund museum-sanctioned research projects, publications, postdoctoral fellowships, and other museum-centred events.

In 2003, the museum completed its first major expansion to its building, the ATCO Tyrrell Learning Centre annex.

Plans to expand the museum's building again were underway as early as 2013, although the museum did not announce its plans to expand the museum building until 2016. The expansion plan saw the construction of a learning lounge annex, that increased the building's size by an additional 1,300 square metres (14,000 sq ft). The learning lounge annex was created in response to the feedback received from the museum, which requested more hands-on exhibits and activities at the museum. The expansion for the museum was funded by the provincial and federal governments, costing approximately C$9.3 million. The provincial government provided C$5.7 million, while the remaining C$3.5 million was provided by the federal government. The expansion marks the first time the museum's received cultural infrastructure funding from the federal government. The learning lounge annex was formally opened to the public on 28 June 2019.

== Grounds ==
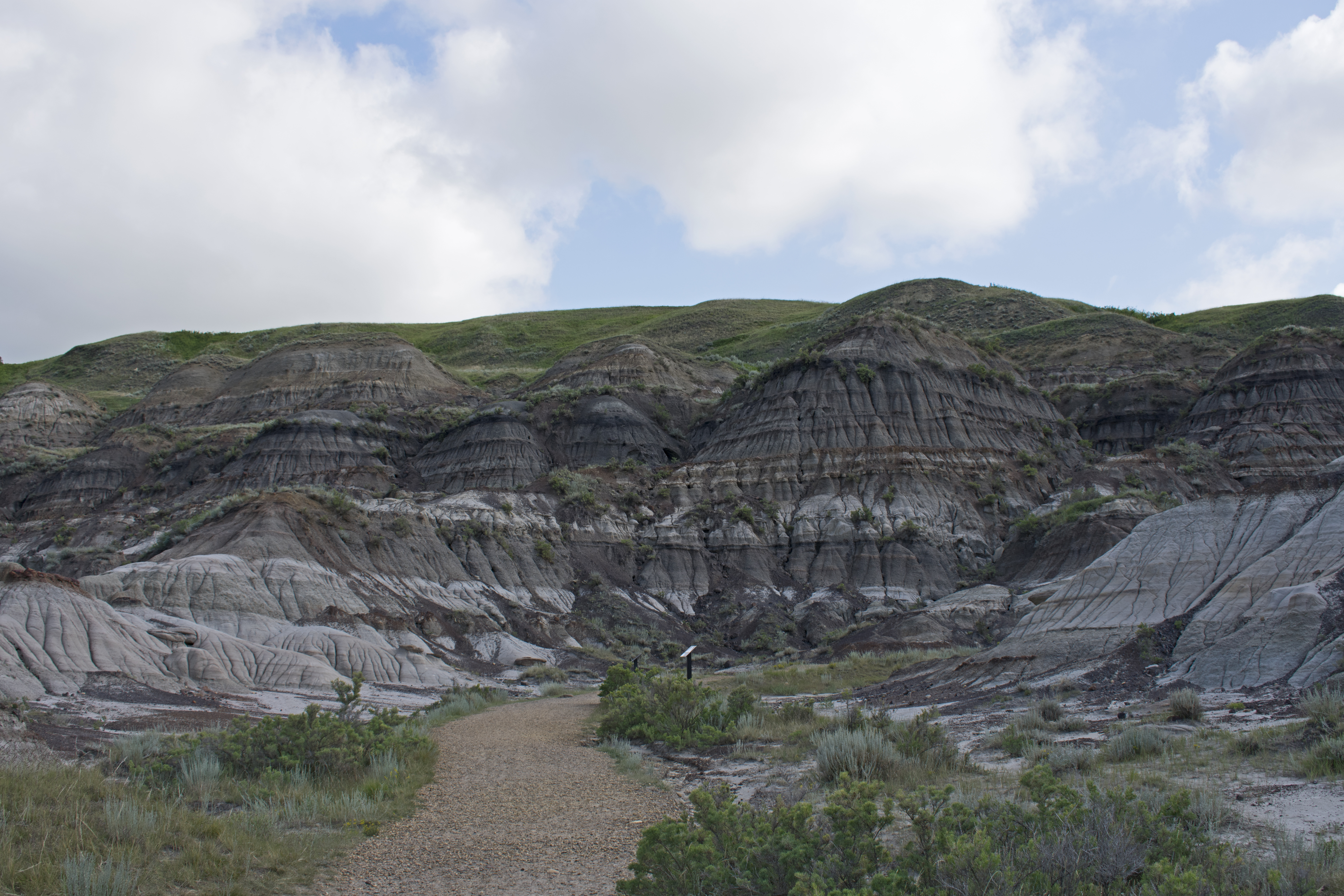
View of Midland Provincial Park from the Badlands Interpretive Trail, a trail used by the museum

The museum is located on North Dinosaur Trail at Midland Provincial Park, in Drumheller, Alberta. The area which the museum occupies is situated in the middle of the fossil-bearing strata of the Late Cretaceous Horseshoe Canyon Formation. The Badlands Interpretive Trail is a 1.4-kilometre (0.87 mi) hiking trail northeast of the museum building, and is used extensively by the museum public and school programs.

=== Building ===
The building was designed to function as a museum, and as a laboratory/research facility. The original structure was completed in 1985, and was expanded twice in the 21st century. The original structure and its first expansion has a total area of 11,200 square metres (121,000 sq ft) of space. The original structure, with its first expansion holds approximately 4,400 square metres (47,000 sq ft) worth of exhibit space. The building's second expansion annex comprise approximately 1,300 square metres (14,000 sq ft) of space, bringing the approximate total area of the museum building to 12,500 square metres (135,000 sq ft).

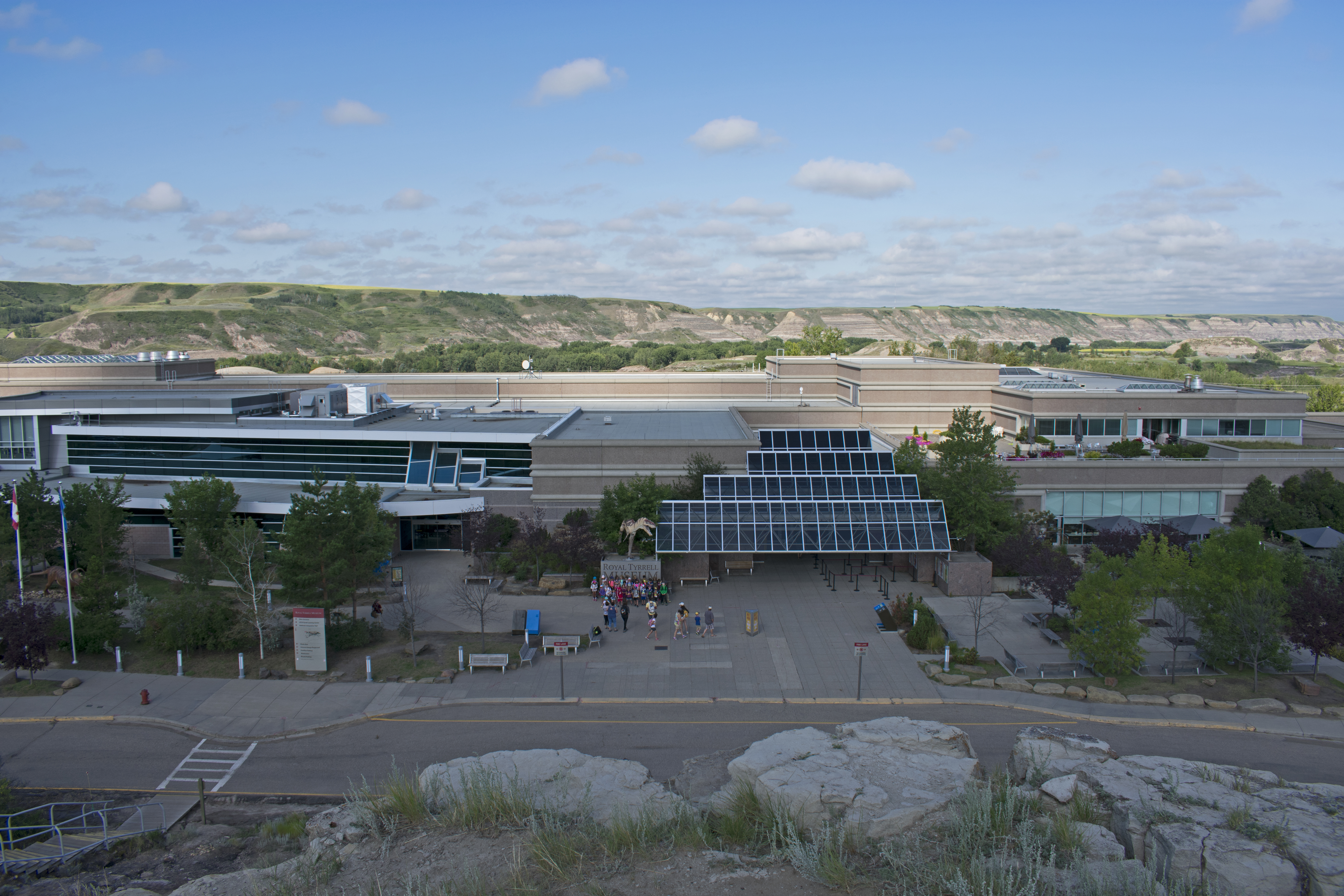
Exterior facade of the museum building from the east

The original building was designed by the Calgary-based BCW Architects, with Doug Craig as the lead architect. Although the design was largely left to Craig, he was given a list of 27 architectural requirements from the museum's director. Several of these requirements included the necessity to harmonize the building with the surrounding badlands, make the entrance easy to locate by routing the driveway to pass the front of the building, and providing adequate space for visitors' eyes to adjust from the light outside and inside the building. The main structure includes several galleries with interactive displays, a cafeteria, gift shop, and a theatre. The museum's main lobby features a mural made of ten 1.2-by-2.4-metre (4 by 8 ft) ceramic panels; titled The Story of Life, the mural was crafted by Lorraine Malach.

The museum contracted BCW Architects again to help design the ATCO Tyrrell Learning Centre, a 1,485-square-metre-annex (15,980 sq ft) to the main museum. The ATCO Tyrrell Learning Centre was completed in 2003 and included several classrooms with distance learning technology that allows researchers to remotely connect with field sites, and a laboratory. The ATCO Tyrrell Learning Centre was designed to accommodate students from elementary to post-secondary levels of education.

In 2019, the museum completed construction of a learning lounge, adding approximately 1,300 square metres (14,000 sq ft) to the main building. The learning lounge expansion was designed by Kasian Architecture, along with the museum, and the government of Alberta. LEAR Construction, a Calgary-based construction firm, was contracted to build the learning lounge expansion. The expansion saw the Distance Learning Studio and accessible washrooms enlarged, as well as the creation of additional classrooms, laboratory spaces, an interactive learning lounge and rest area, and other multipurpose rooms.

== Exhibits ==
As of 2020, the museum building houses thirteen exhibits that display approximately 800 fossils on permanent display. Audio-visual, interactive computers, and video programs and displays typically provide relevant information on the items in the exhibit. Several artistic works by Vladimir Krb are also exhibited in the museum's exhibits.

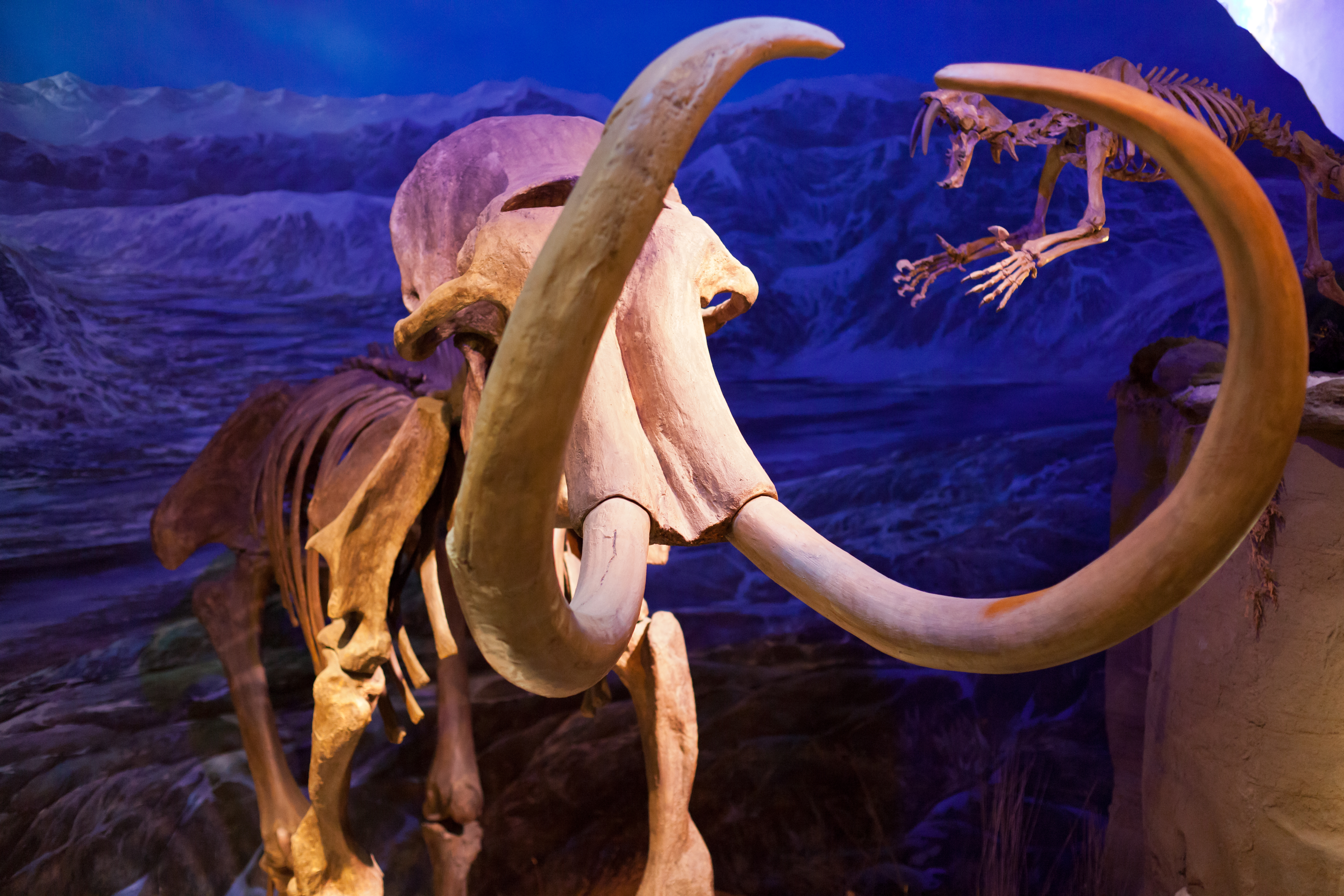
Skeletal frames of a mammoth and a Smilodon the Cenozoic Gallery

A number of these exhibits are organized by geologic eras, displaying specimens and dioramas from those periods. These exhibits includes Cenozoic Gallery, Cretaceous Alberta, Cretaceous Garden, Palaeozoic Era, and Terrestrial Palaeozoic. The Cretaceous Alberta exhibit features a diorama of an Albertosaurus pack inspired by 22 specimens found in a bonebed in Alberta, as an homage to Joseph Tyrrell, who first discovered the dinosaur.

Several exhibits are also organized by locale, or focused on a specific fossil-bearing deposit, such as the Burgess Shale exhibit. The Grounds for Discovery exhibit displays specimens found from commercial and industrial digs. The world's most well-preserved thyreophora is situated within the Grounds for Discovery exhibit, a fossil of a Borealopelta found by oil sand workers at the Athabasca oil sands.

Other exhibits that display specimens from the museum's fossil collection includes the Dinosaur Hall, Fossils in Focus, and Triassic Giants. Dinosaur Hall houses over thirty mounted dinosaur skeletons including specimens of an Albertosaurus, Camarasaurus, Triceratops, and a Tyrannosaurus, including Black Beauty, the fourteenth-most complete skeleton of a Tyrannosaurus in the world. Fossils in Focus is an exhibit that typically displays specimens of interest for the museum's research program. Triassic Giants is an exhibit dedicated to Elizabeth Nicholls, the museum's former curator of marine reptiles, and houses a specimen of a Shonisaurus, the world's largest marine reptile.

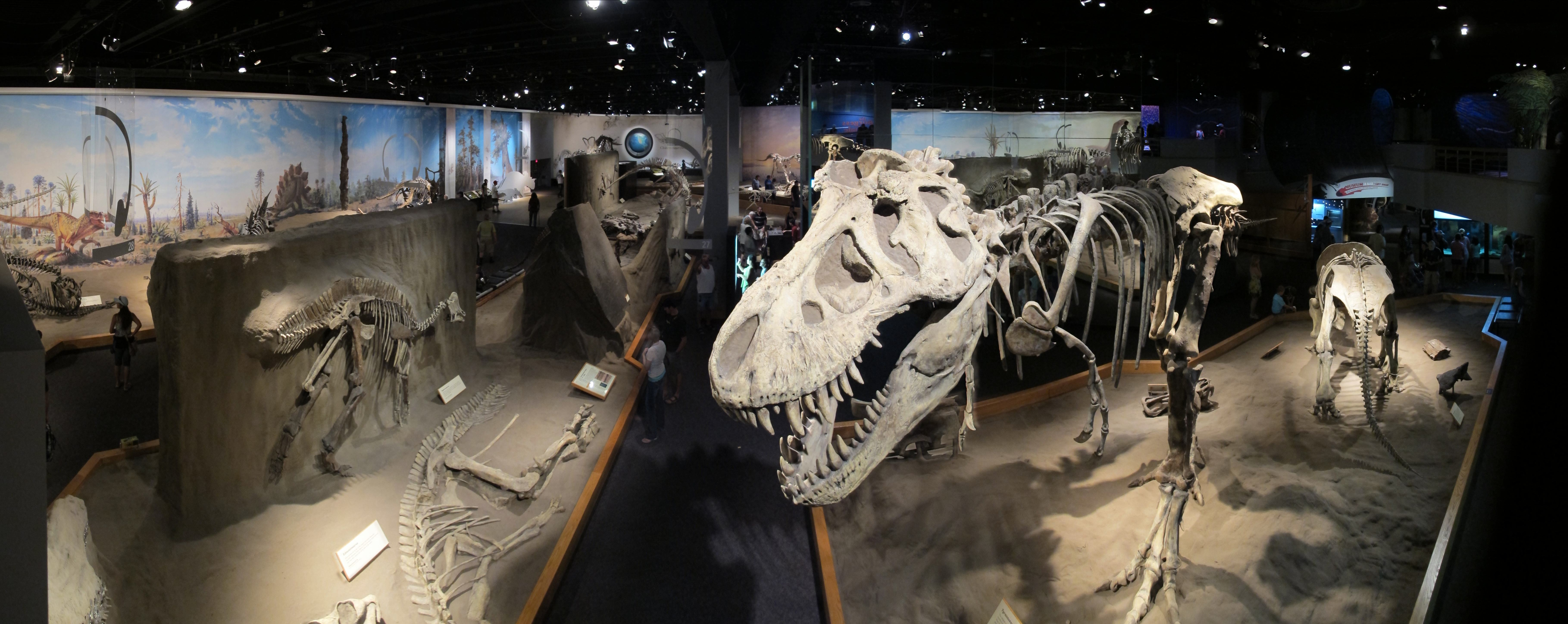
Dinosaur Hall houses a number of dinosaur skeletal frames

Along with exhibits that are primarily concerned with the exhibition of specimens and dioramas, the museum also has two exhibits related on palaeontology, Foundations, and Preparation Lab; the latter exhibit allowing visitors to watch technicians as they prepare fossils for exhibits or research. Other exhibits in the museum includes the Cretaceous Garden, which is designed to mimic the Albertan environment during the Cretaceous era by planting living relatives of the vegetation that grew in Alberta during that era. Opened in 2019, the Learning Lounge is the museum's newest exhibit, and serves as the museum's interactive and hands-on exhibit, and includes a bronze statue of an Albertosaurus, and interactive displays on how dinosaurs ate, moved, and interacted with other organisms.

=== Gallery ===
The Story of Life, Lorraine Malach, 2003. On display at the museum's lobby

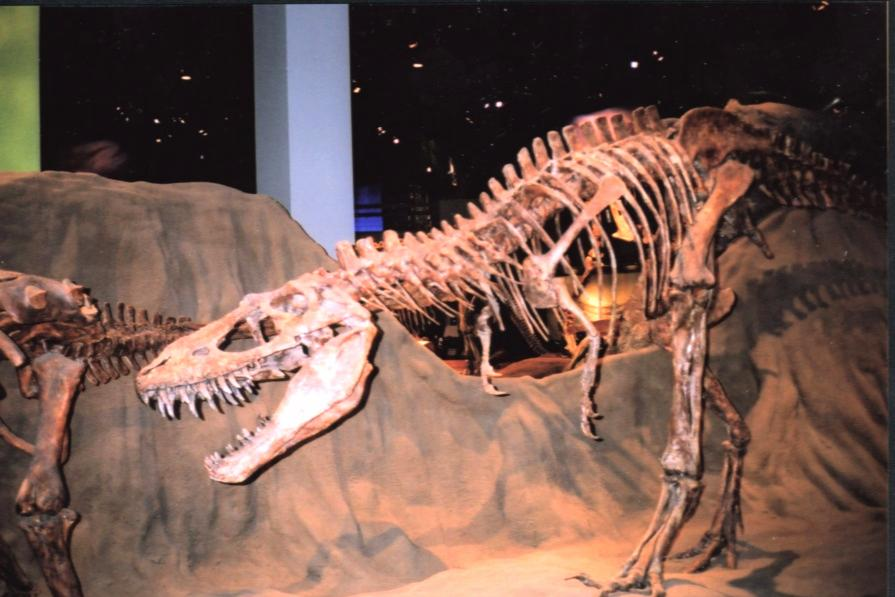
An Albertosaurus and a Euoplocephalus on display

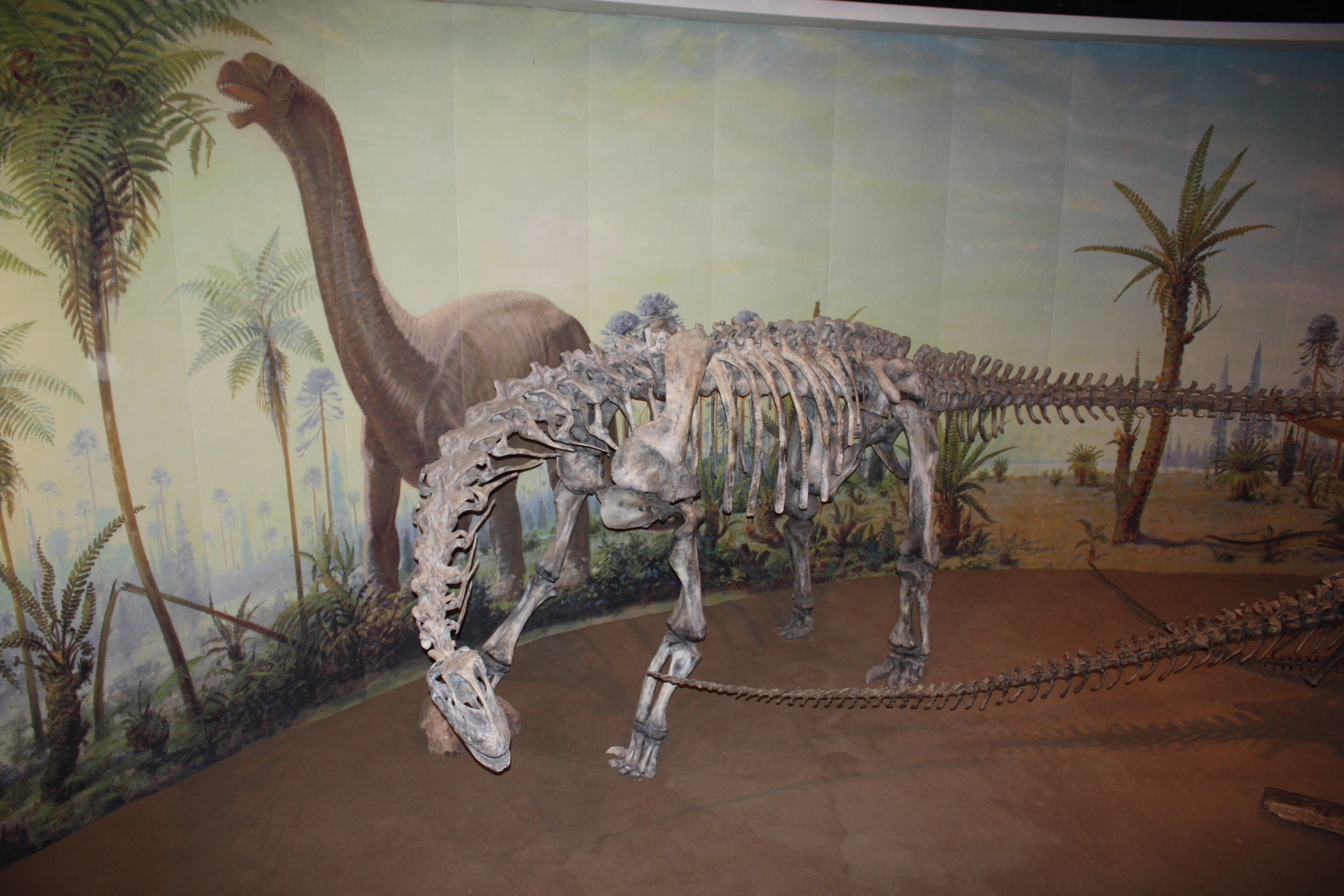
Camarasaurus on display

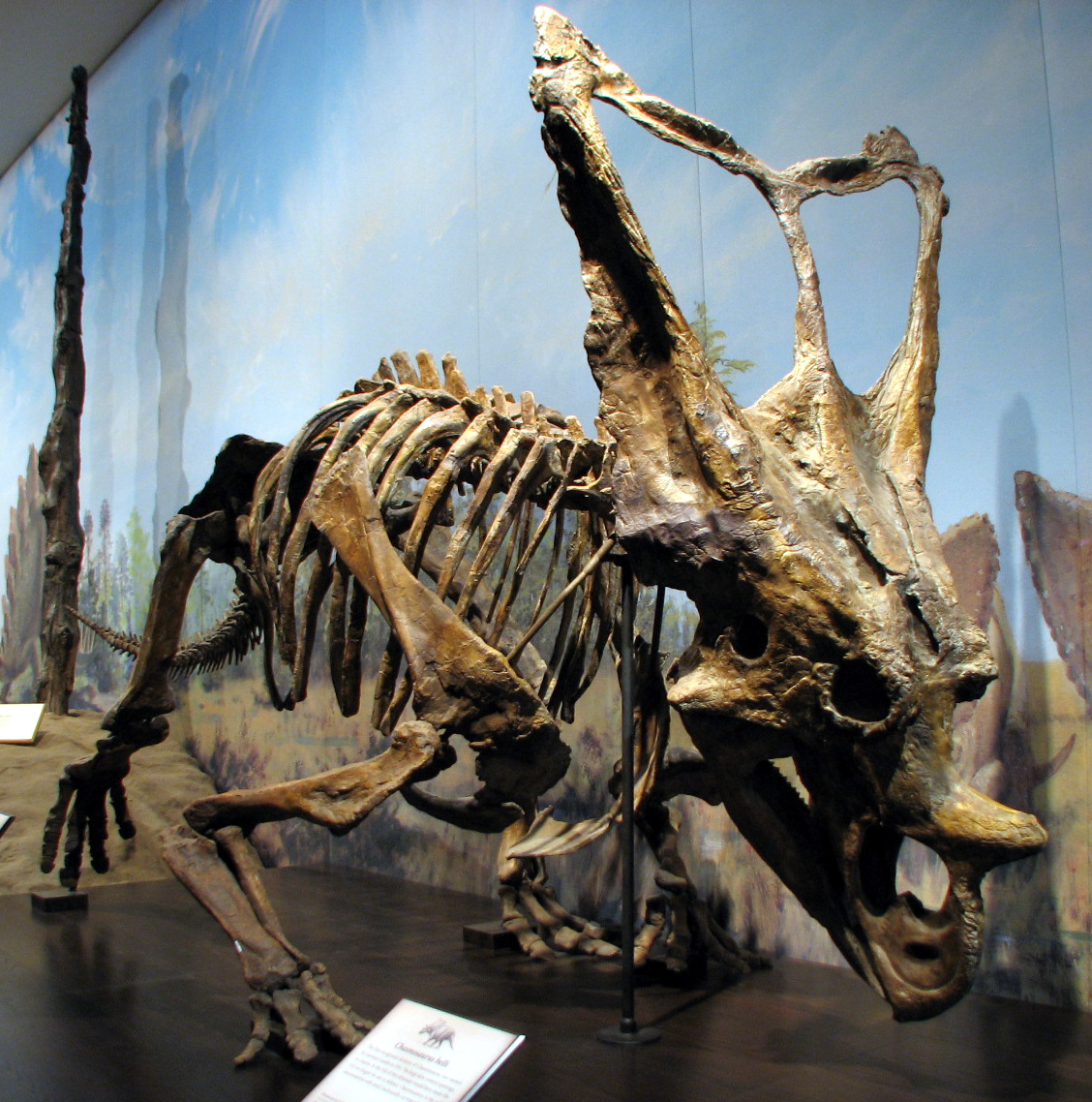
Chasmosaurus found in Dinosaur Provincial Park on display

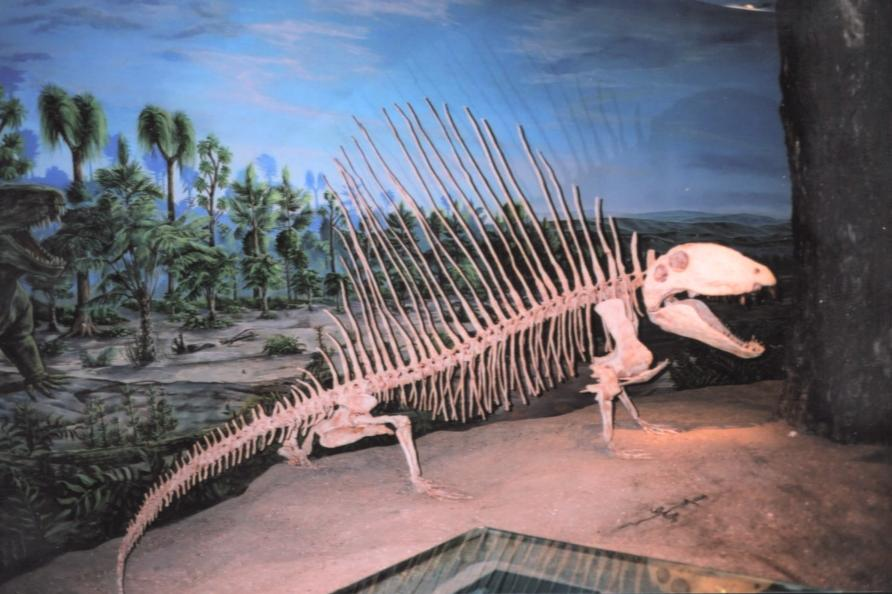
Dimetrodon on display

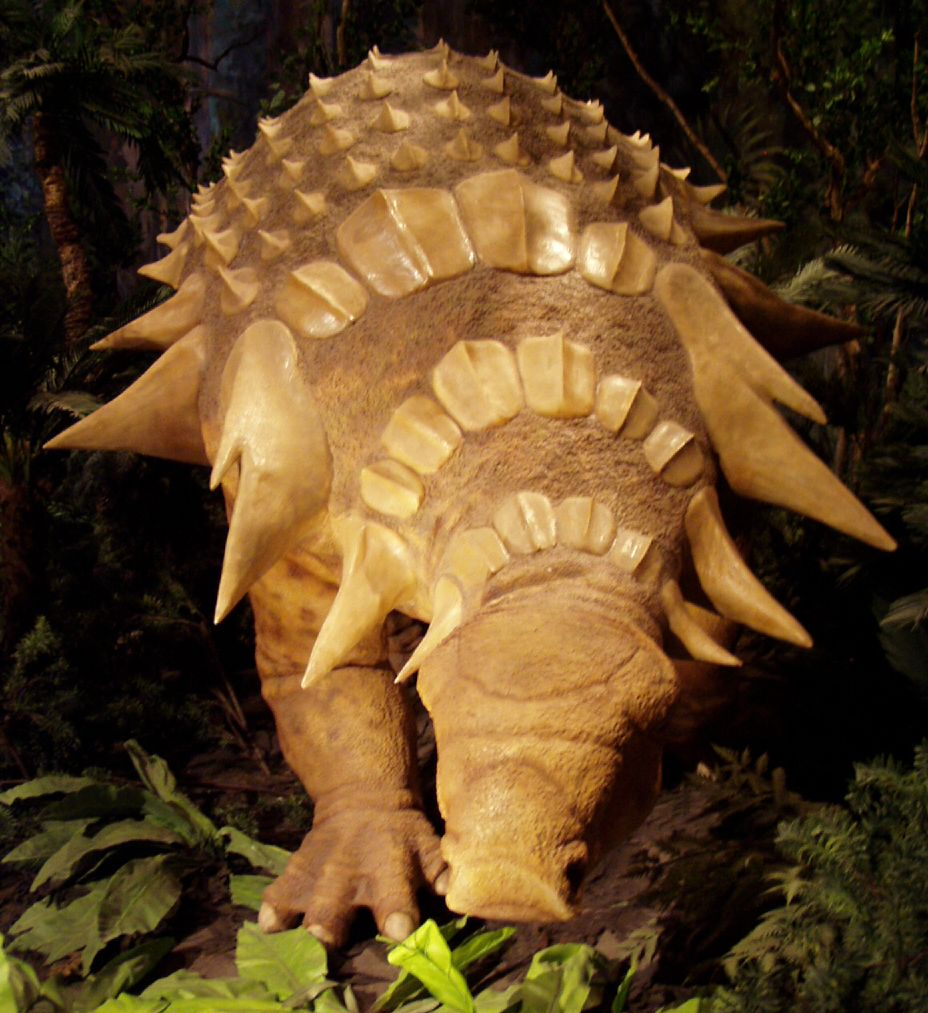
Edmontonia model on display

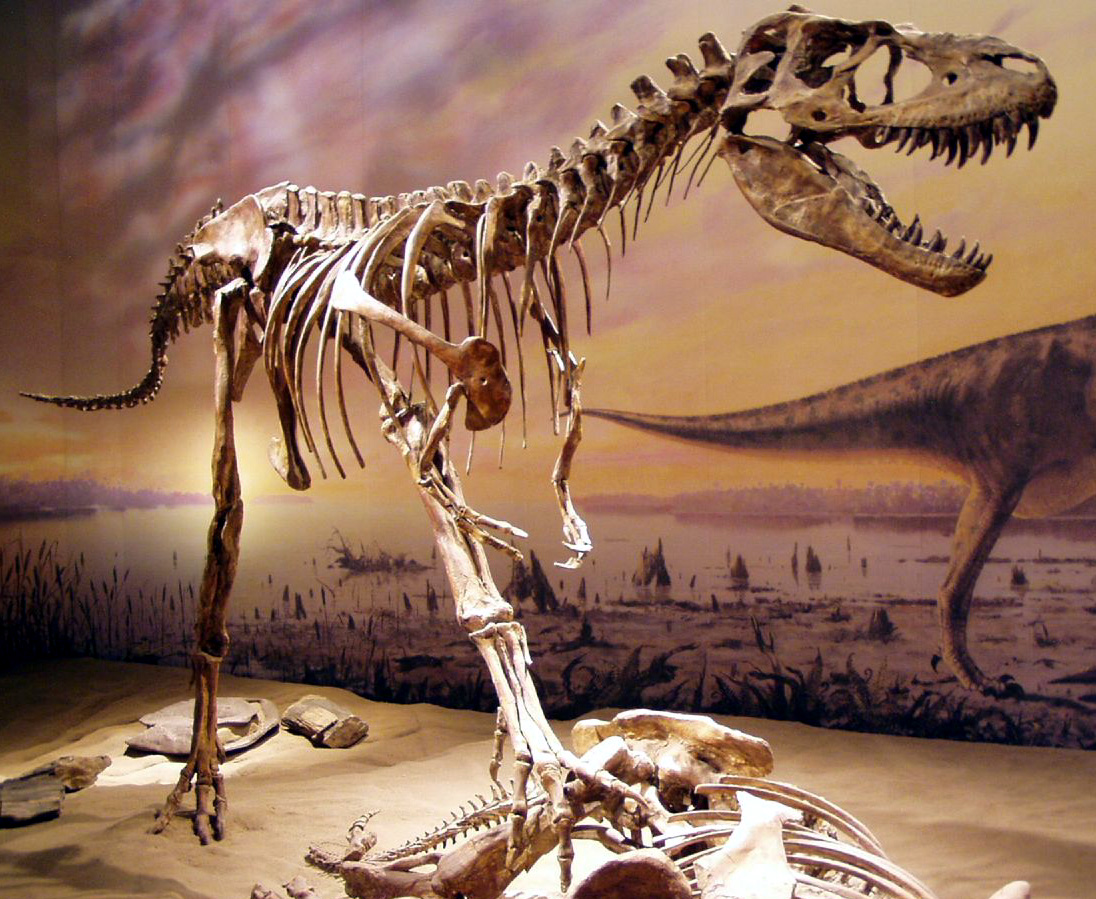
Gorgosaurus on display

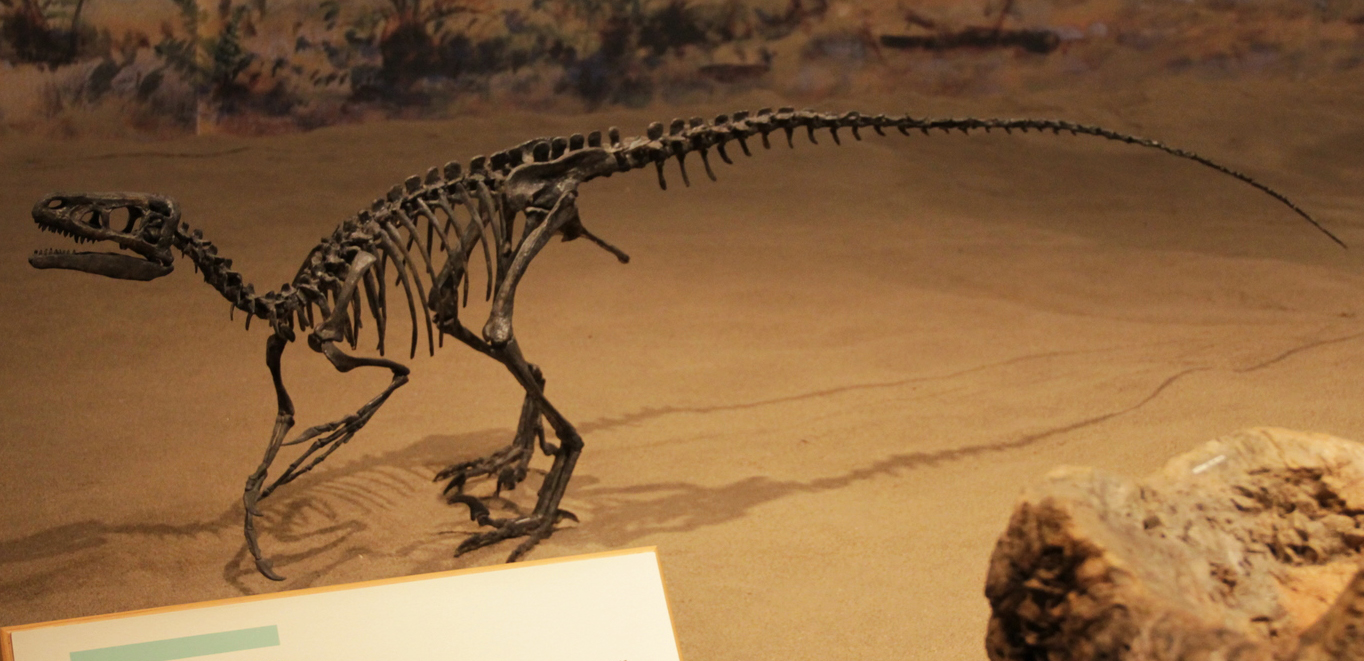
Ornitholestes on display

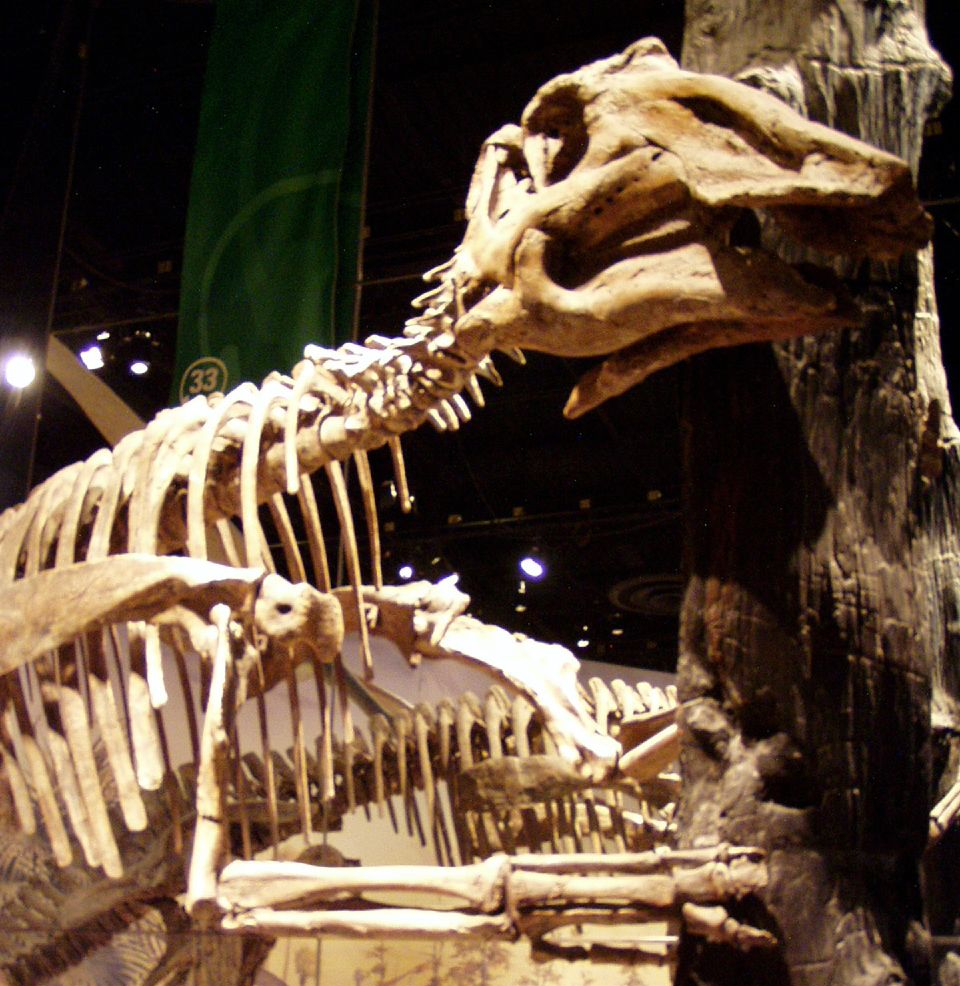
Prosaurolophus on display

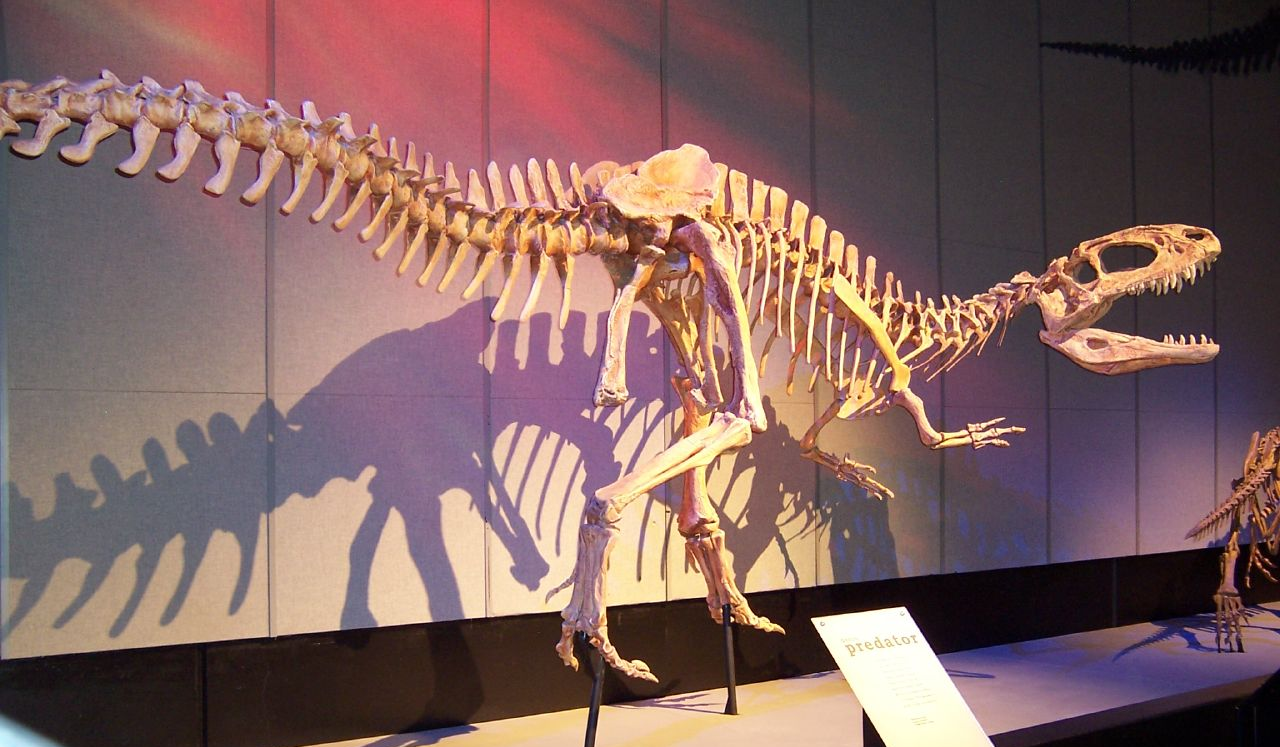
Sinraptor dongi on display

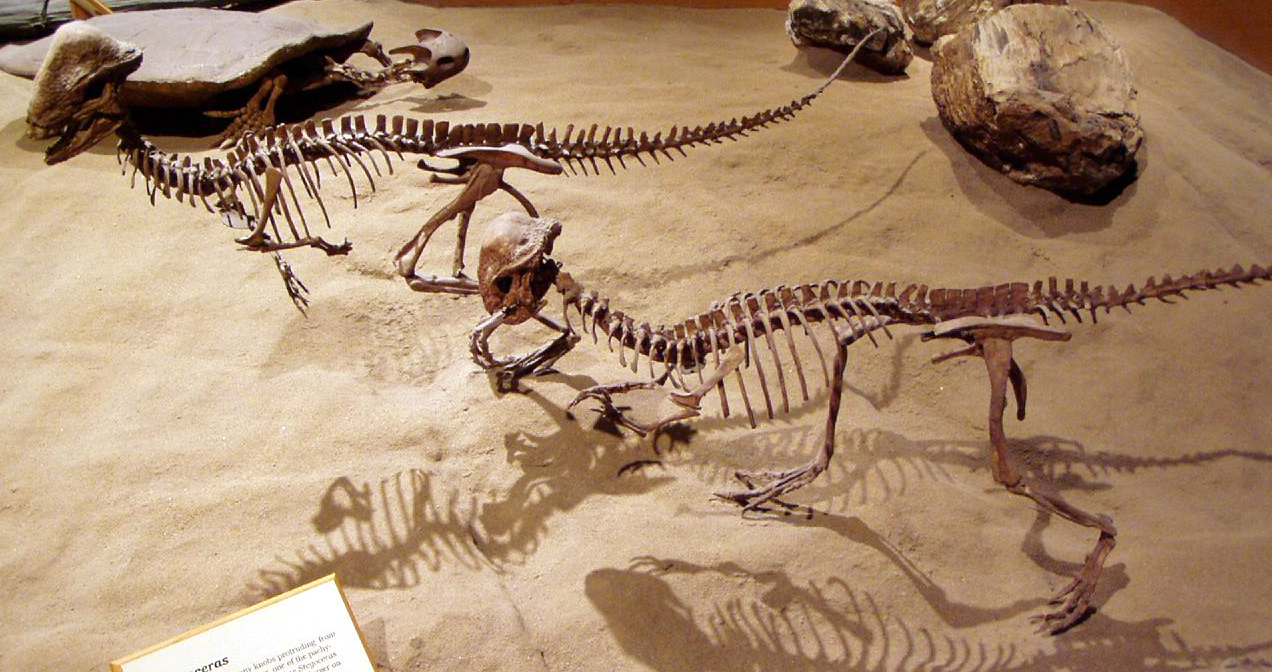
Two Stegoceras on display

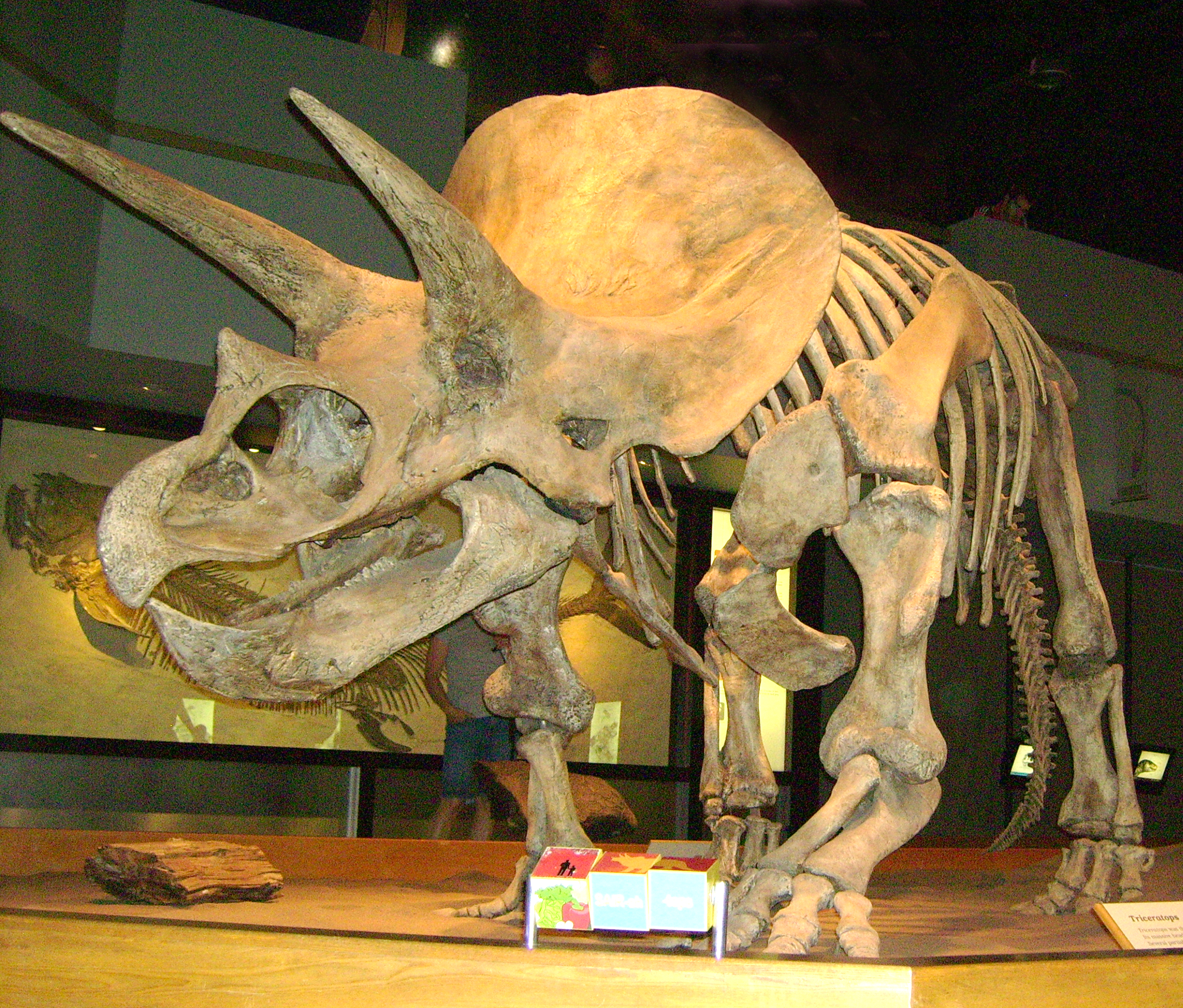
Triceratops on display

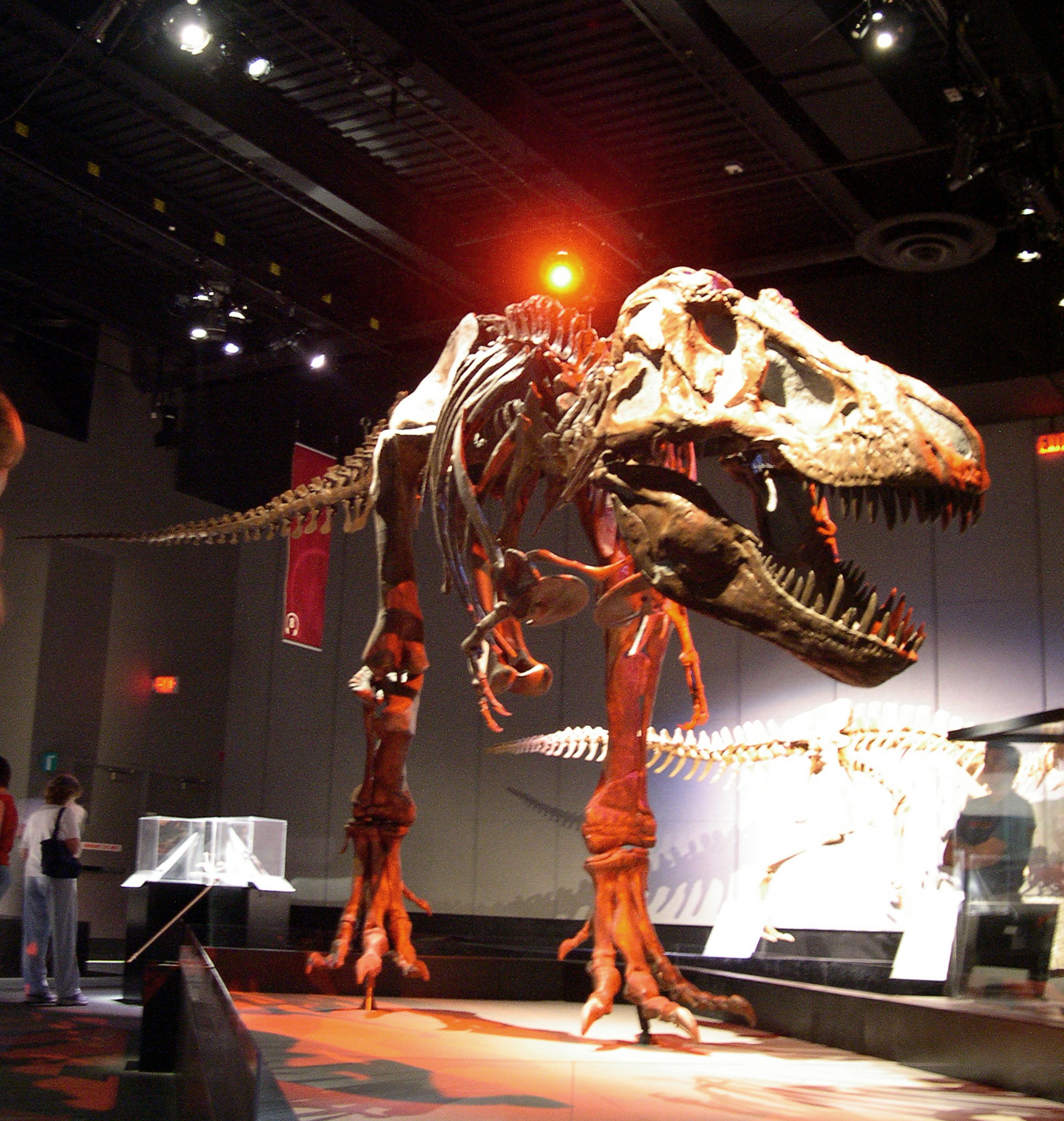
Tyrannosaurus on display

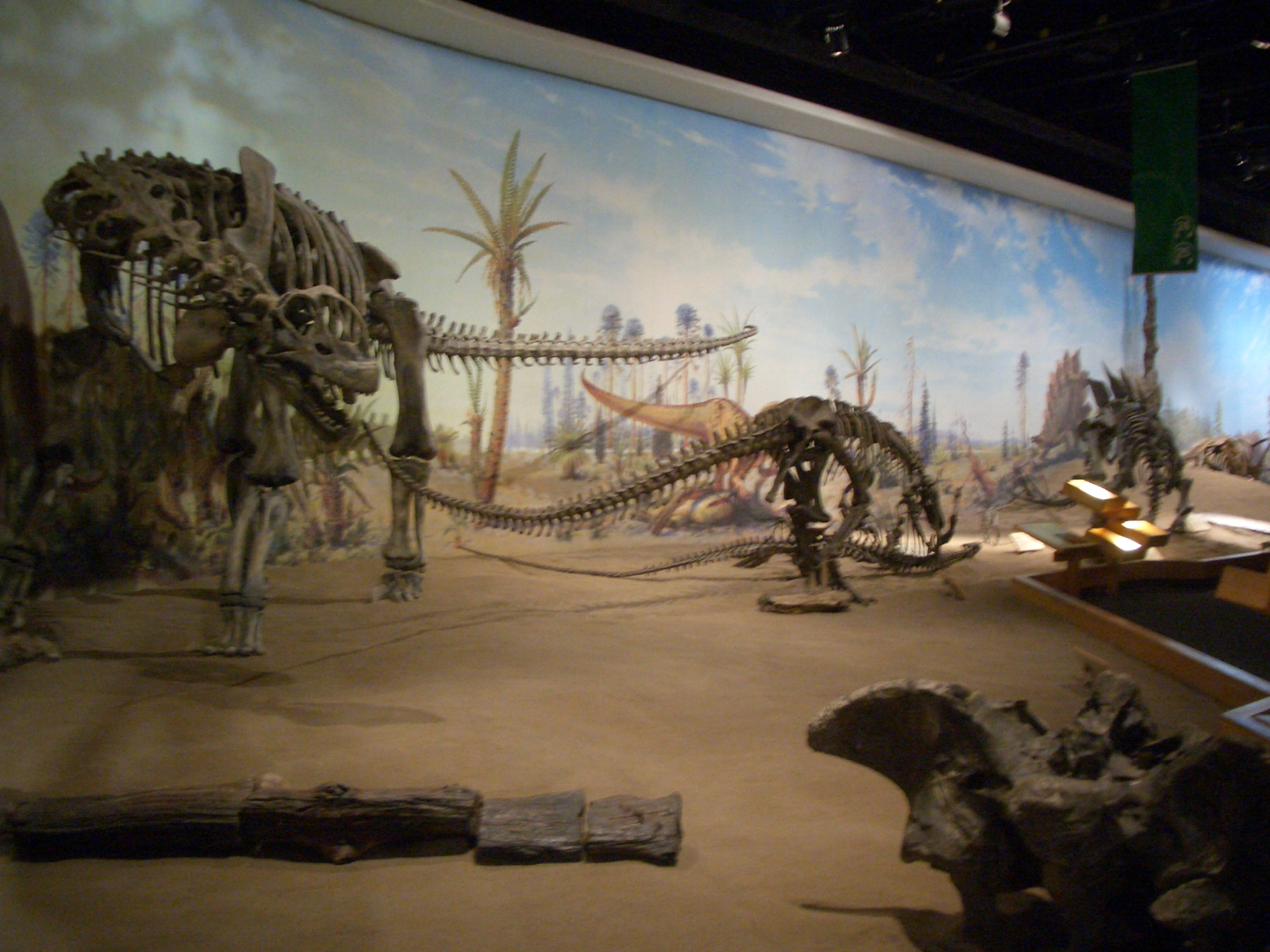
Jurassic section

== Collection ==
As of 2020, the museum's collection held over 350 holotypes, and approximately 160,000 cataloged fossils; providing the museum with the largest fossil collection in Canada. As of November 2021, the museum's collection holds five Guinness World Records due to its unique collection of fossils; including the best-preserved Borealopelta, and a Albertonectes fossil that has the longest neck recorded.

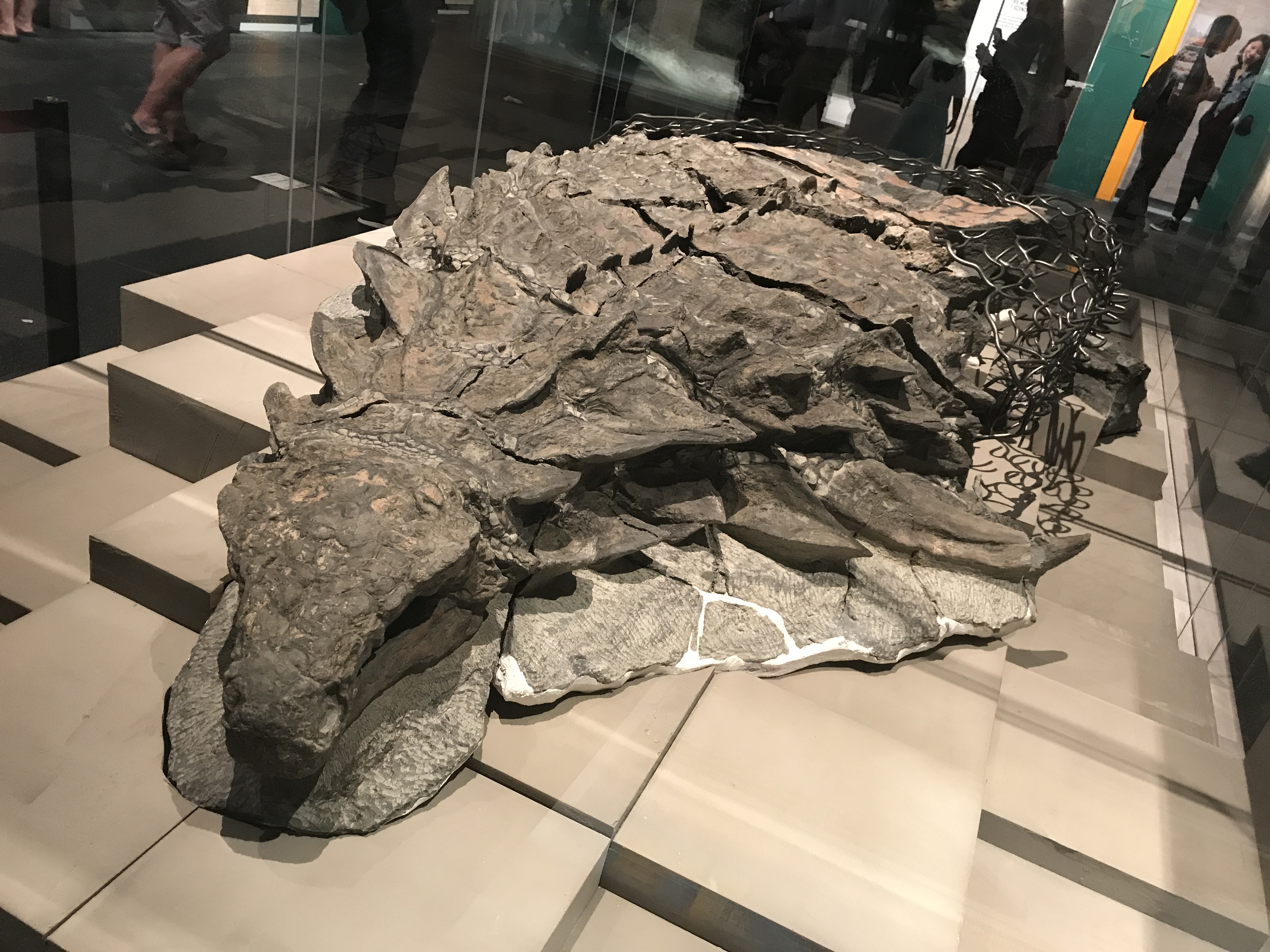
A Borealopelta on display. The specimen is one of many from the collection that was found in Alberta

Items from the collection are either used for research, or for museum exhibits. Approximately 0.5 per cent of the collection are placed on display in the museum's exhibits.

Approximately half of these items are fossils dating back to the Cretaceous period. The majority of these fossils originate from Alberta, with approximately 85 per cent of the fossils from the province being collected from the museum's fieldwork. In addition to the Cretaceous fossils of Alberta, the museum also holds a number of fossils from the Palaeocene of Alberta, the Palaeozoic of the Canadian Arctic, and in the Palaeozoic, Triassic, and Early Cretaceous of British Columbia.

Besides fieldwork, the museum has also acquired items for its collection through a variety of other means, including donations, exchanges, purchases, salvage operations of industrial excavations, and from palaeontologists archiving their works at the museum. Most of the specimens that were purchased were acquired in the early 1980s, when the institution was provided a large acquisition budget in preparation for its opening. Approximately 3,000 specimens are added to the collection annually.

== Programs ==
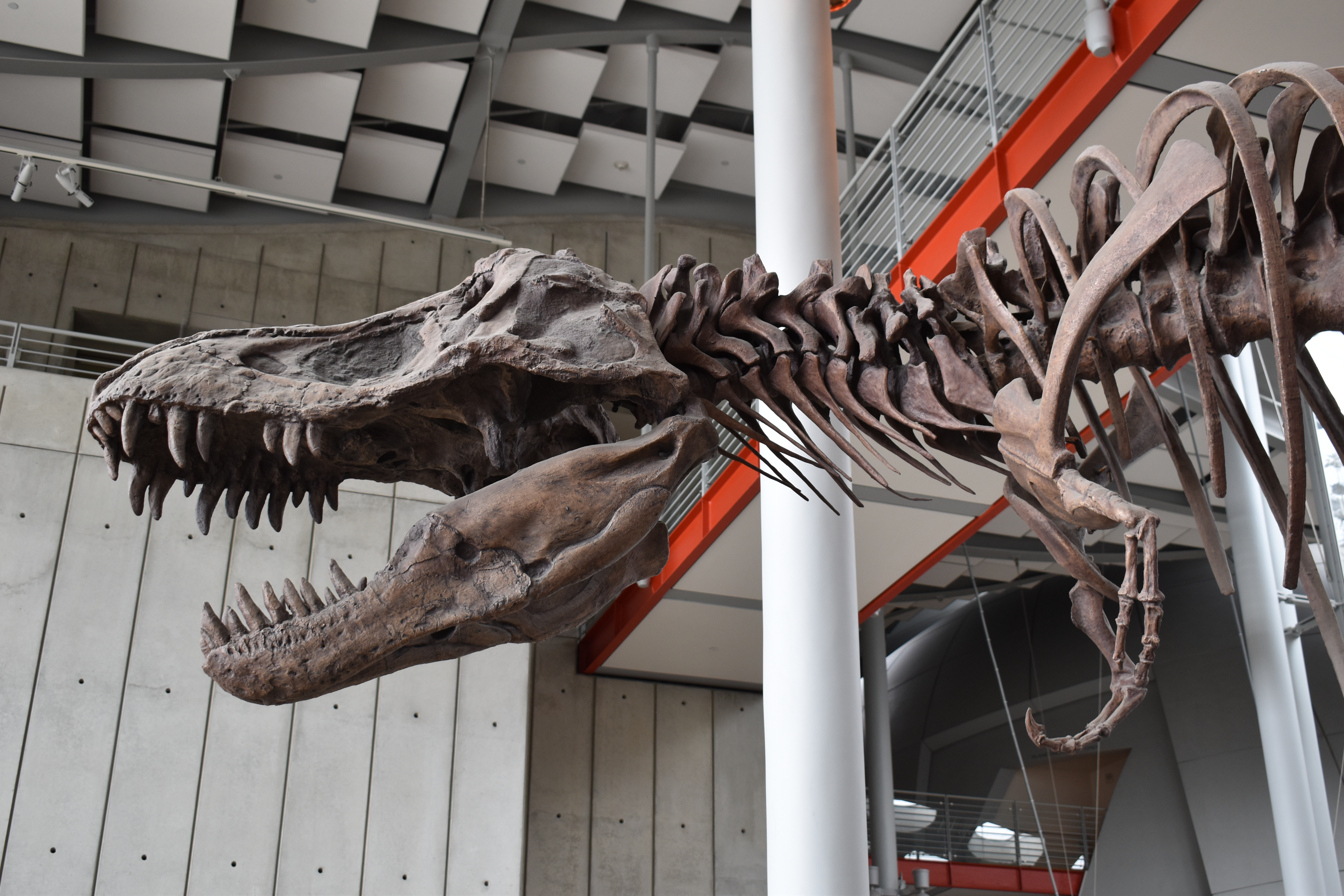
A replica of a Tyrannosaurus from the RTMP's collection at the California Academy of Sciences. The RTMP produces replicas of specimens from its collection for other museums to use.

Guided tours of the surrounding Midland Provincial Park are offered by the museum staff. The museum also operate several outreach programs, providing students hands-on field training, and conducting several "pay-to-dig" programs in the Drumheller area, where members of the public participate in bonebed excavation. The museum has a suite of distance learning programs, providing educational programming to students.

The museum operates a casting and molding program where it creates replicas of specimens from its own collections, providing them for use to other museums.

=== Research ===
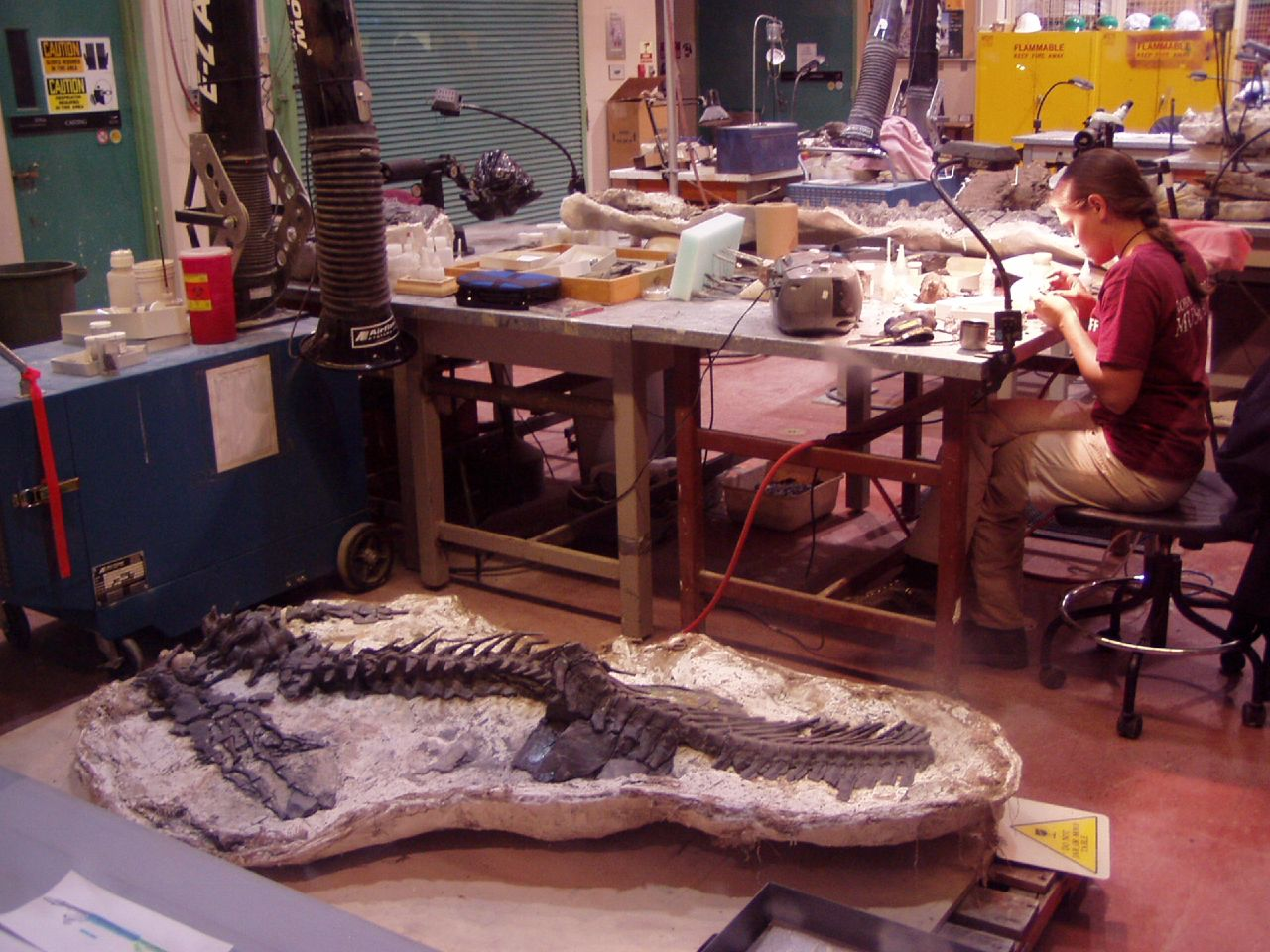
A member of the museum staff working on a fossil in the museum's preparation laboratory. The prepared specimen displayed is a Prognathodon mosasaur TMP 2002.400.0001

The museum research program has a broad mandate to document and analyze geological and palaeontological history, with reference to Alberta. The museum's research program includes a palaeontological research group, as well as a rotating roster of postdoctoral fellows and graduate students. Palaeontological technicians of the museum assist, or oversee fieldwork operations; as well as prepare fossils for exhibits, or research. In 2015, the museum's group of palaeontological technicians had collectively over 150 years of cumulative experience. Although formally not employed for the purposes of research, palaeontological technicians have performed independent, or collaborative research projects at the museum in the past.

The majority of the research papers authored by members of the museum's research program is devoted to vertebrates, with its members having published less than 40 papers on macro plants, palynomorphs, and invertebrates as of 2015. Findings from the research program are regularly incorporated into the museum's exhibits, and educational outreach programs.

The museum's research team was initially founded in the early 1980s, and was initially tasked with searching for specimens for the museum's exhibits and collections. After the demand for exhibit-quality specimens was met, the museum's researchers were reoriented towards documenting and interpreting the geology, and fossils of Midland Provincial Park, Dinosaur Provincial Park, and other areas in the province. The museum has maintained a 500-square-metre (5,400 sq ft) permanent field station at Dinosaur Provincial Park since 1987. Other areas in Canada where the museum's research program has conducted fieldwork includes British Columbia, the Canadian Arctic, Manitoba, and Saskatchewan.

The museum has conducted a number of research collaborations with other institutions, including the Geological Survey of Canada, Institute of Vertebrate Paleontology and Paleoanthropology, other museums in North America, and universities based in Alberta. Many of the museum's research projects are based in Alberta, although it has conducted research projects out of the province. As of 2015, the museum has participated in 10 collaborative, and externally-funded research projects outside of Alberta, the first being the Sino-Canadian Dinosaur Project in 1985. As of 2015, these collaborative, out-of-province research projects has resulted in over 75 research publications.

== See also ==
- List of museums in Alberta
- List of natural history museums
- World's Largest Dinosaur, a roadside attraction in Drumheller
