= Happy Rock =

Roadside Attraction

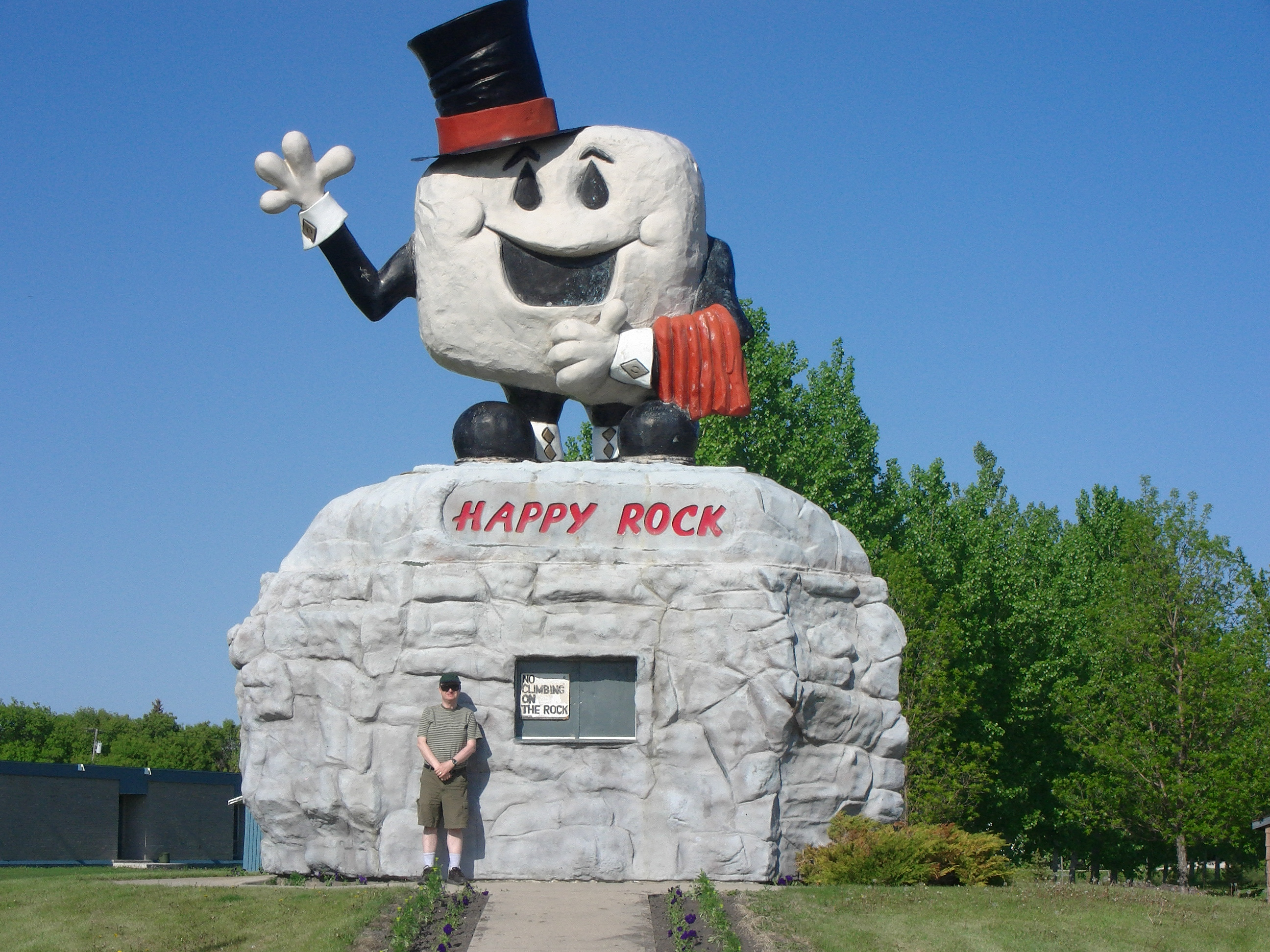
- Year: 1993
- Medium: Fibreglass
- Location: Gladstone, Manitoba
- 50.2199°N 98.9531°W

Happy Rock is a roadside attraction in Gladstone, Manitoba, Canada. It is on the northeast side of Highway 16. The large statue also serves as the visitor information centre for the town.

== History ==
In the late 1970s, the provincial government met with local community representatives to try to find a method of increasing tourism in Gladstone. Since Gladstone was also referred to as "Happy Rock," they decided that it would be a good idea to create something that would symbolize this.

In 1984, the local Chamber of Commerce held a logo contest for the design of a mascot that would represent Happy Rock. The winning entry, submitted by Jerry Wickstead, depicted a literal black and white Happy Rock with a towel in its left hand while its right hand was waving. By 1988, the Chamber decided to pursue a construction of this figure as a statue and visitor information centre.

Fundraising for this project was held between 1991 and 1993. Volunteers held two bingo events, the Chamber held two banquet dinners, and the committee held three cash prize draws. The Community Places Grant Program also provided funding of up to 25% of the total project cost.

The F.A.S.T. Corporation from Sparta, Wisconsin, was chosen to manufacture the design of Happy Rock from the blueprints prepared by architects from Winnipeg, who decided to create Happy Rock out of fibreglass. The construction took around four months to complete and was finished in 1993. The cost of the project was nearly $92,000. When Happy Rock was finished, its total height was 36 feet (11 metres) and weighed around 3,000 pounds (approximately 1400 kilograms).

On July 1, 1993, Happy Rock was officially opened. It is now the symbol of the rural community and an integral part of the tourism in Gladstone.

Happy Rock was depicted on a Canada Post stamp released on July 5, 2010.
