= Kubasonics =

Ukrainian-Canadian speed-folk band

- Origin: Edmonton, Alberta, Canada
- Genres: Folk fusion
- Years active: 1996–present
- Members: Brian Cherwick; Maria Cherwick; Jacob Cherwick; Darren Browne; Matt Hender
- Past members: Beth Cherwick; Paul Cherwick; Bill Yacey; Jay Lind; Taras Zakordonski; Thom Bennett; Paul Bendzsa
- Website: kubasonics.com

The Kubasonics are a Ukrainian-Canadian speed-folk band based in St. John's, Newfoundland. Originally from Edmonton, Alberta, The Kubasonics are honoured in the Ukrainian Canadian community for recreating traditional Ukrainian melodies, with a twist. Humorous or surprising alterations to time-honored songs create a sound that is often described as a "folk fusion." To create their unique sound, the Kubasonics incorporate traditional Ukrainian instruments such as the tsymbaly, drymba and Hurdy-gurdy into the context of a western rock band.

== History ==
=== Formation and Alberta ===
The Kubasonics première performance was at Edmonton's Hopak in the Park in June 1996. Leading member Brian Cherwick had met many of his soon-to-be bandmates as he studied at the University of Alberta earning a PhD ("Polkas on the Prairies: Ukrainian Music and the Construction of Identity") from the Centre for Ukrainian Canadian Studies.

The founding members of the Kubasonics were Brian, Brian's brother - Paul Cherwick (drums), Brian's late wife - Beth Cherwick (violin), Jay Lind (guitar) and Bill Yacey (bass).Brian, Paul, Jay, and Bill all contributed to the band's 2005 album titled "Big Beet Music." Additionally, Thom Bennet (drums), Rod Olstad (vocals and violin), Taras Zakordonski (bass), and Maria Cherwick (violin) worked on Big Beet Music. Of the band members who contributed to Big Beet Music, only Brian Cherwick, Paul Cherwick, Maria Cherwick, Bill Yacey, and Taras Zakordonski are of Ukrainian origin.

Individually, the band members have had a wide range of musical influences. In particular, D-Drifters 5, known for playing traditional Ukrainian polka music, were an inspiration for Brian who started playing piano at a young age and percussion in university. The Kubasonics have played renditions of some songs by the D-Drifters 5. Over the years, they added more of Brian's writing and contemporary pieces to the folk music of their performance repertoire. The track "Giants of the Prairies" from their album of the same title exemplifies one of their sillier songs. They sing about landmarks like Vegreville, Alberta's enormous Easter egg, Glendon, Alberta's giant perogy, and Vilna, Alberta's massive mushroom. This track was even played on a CBC program about gigantic landmarks. "Giants of the Prairies" was not the only Kubasonics song to be played on national television. Another song off "Giants of the Prairies", "Billy Mosienko", was played on Hockey Night in Canada as a tribute for the 50th anniversary of Mosienko's 21-second hat-trick. Despite some silly songs, the Kubasonics retain a sense of traditionalism on their albums. Songs like "Early Bird Of Spring," from their Giants of the Prairies album appeal to some of their more conservative listeners.

The popularity of the Kubasonics is not limited to the Canadian music community. In the summer of 2008, the band performed in major Ukrainian cities including Lviv and Kyiv. The band also performed at the 2008 Canadian National Ukrainian Festival. For the CNUF, held in Dauphin, Manitoba, the Kubasonics are appropriate performers since one goal of the festival is to present the unique Ukrainian culture of Canada. The band has performed at Toronto's annual Ukrainian Festival (held on Bloor Street). In contrast to performing in front of thousands of festival attendees at Toronto's annual Ukrainian Festival, another one of the band's memorable gigs was their smaller-scale 10th anniversary concert.

In the summer of 2011, The Kubasonics hosted a 15th anniversary concert at Queen Alex Hall in Edmonton. It marked the 15th year of the band's history and the last official Kubasonics concert "for a while", before Brian Cherwick moved to St. John's Newfoundland.

=== Relocation to Newfoundland and "Kubfunland" ===
In 2011, bandleader Brian Cherwick relocated to St. John's, Newfoundland, where he became involved in the local music community. In September 2015, Brian formed a new iteration of The Kubasonics featuring past member, Maria Cherwick on violin, past guest musician, Jacob Cherwick on drums, Darren "Boobie" Browne on guitar, Matt Hender on bass, and Paul Bendzsa on clarinet and saxophone.

In March 2017, The Kubasonics were selected to travel to Port of Spain, Trinidad & Tobago, as part of the Club One New Releases television program presented by Bell Media and FLOW TV.

In April 2017, The Kubasonics released their fifth album, titled Kubfunland. This was the first Kubasonics album to feature music sung entirely in Ukrainian. The band then proceeded to tour in support of the album throughout the summer of 2017, including stops in Ottawa, Montreal, Toronto, Ukraine, Romania, Slovakia, and Poland.

== Members ==
=== Current ===
Current members of the Kubasonics are:

- Brian Cherwick
- Maria Cherwick
- Jacob Cherwick
- Darren Browne
- Matt Hender

=== Previous ===
Past group members include:

- Beth Cherwick
- Paul Cherwick
- Bill Yacey
- Jay Lind
- Taras Zakordonski
- Thom Bennett
- Paul Bendzsa

== Discography ==
- Miaso (1999)
- Giants of the Prairies (2002)
- Big Beet Music (2005)
- IV Play (2010)
- Kubfunland (2017)
- Winter Carols (2018)
