= Giants of the Prairies =

List of large roadside attractions in Western Canada

The Giants of the Prairies are a group of "world's biggest" roadside attractions found in Western Canada, especially in small towns populated mostly by Ukrainian Canadians.

== List ==
Attraction	Community	Province	Image	Date constructed
World's Largest Badminton Racket	St. Albert	Alberta		2000
World's Largest Beaver	Beaverlodge	Alberta	Beaverlodge beaver	2004
World's Largest Bee	Falher	Alberta	Falher bee	1990
World's Largest Honey Bee	Tisdale	Saskatchewan		1993
Aaron the Blue Heron	Barrhead	Alberta		1984
World's Largest Border Markers	Lloydminster	Alberta and Saskatchewan		1994
World's Largest Bucking Saddle Bronc and Rider, "The Legacy"	Ponoka	Alberta		2004
World's Largest bunnock	Macklin	Saskatchewan	Giant Bunnock (horse's leg bone) in Macklin SK. Summer 2004	1994
World's Largest Curling Rock	Arborg	Manitoba		2005
World's Largest Coke Can	Portage la Prairie	Manitoba	Portage la Prairie, Manitoba, is home to the world's largest Coke can, formerly a water tower.	1994
World's Largest Chuckwagon	Dewberry	Alberta		1995
World's Largest Dinosaur	Drumheller	Alberta	Drumheller T-rex	2001
World's Largest Fire Hydrant	Elm Creek	Manitoba		2001
World's Largest Animated Grizzly Bear	Innisfail	Alberta		2013
Goose Statue	Hanna	Alberta		
World's Largest Golf Tee	Trochu	Alberta		2009
World's Largest kielbasa	Mundare	Alberta	Mundare kubasa	2001
World's Largest Mallard Duck	Andrew	Alberta	Mallard duck sculpture in Andrew, Alberta : 23 Foot (7.2 Metre) Wingspan. Weighs 1 tonne.	1992
World's Largest Mosquito	Komarno	Manitoba		
World's Largest Mushroom	Vilna	Alberta	World's Largest Mushrooms in Vilna, Alberta, Canada, 20 feet high and 5 feet in diameter	
World's Largest Oil Can	Rocanville	Saskatchewan	closeup of "World's Largest Oilcan" in Rocanville, SK. Summer 2004	
World's Largest Oil Derrick	Redwater	Alberta		
World's Largest Oil Lamp	Donalda	Alberta	Lamp in Donalda, Alberta	
World's Largest painting on an easel (reproduction of Van Gogh's Sunflowers)	Altona	Manitoba	Vincent (3692305291)	1998
World's Largest Piggy Bank	Coleman	Alberta		
World's Largest Putter	Bow Island	Alberta		
World's Large Pinto Bean, "Pinto Macbean"	Bow Island	Alberta		
Giant Sunflower	Bow Island	Alberta		
Giant Prairie Crocuses	Daysland	Alberta		
World's Largest Softball, "Susie"	Chauvin	Alberta		
World's Largest Railroad Spike	Hines Creek	Alberta		
World's Largest Sundial	Lloydminster	Alberta and Saskatchewan		
World's Tallest Teepee	Medicine Hat	Alberta	Medicine Hat Saamis	
World's Largest Wagon Wheel and Pick	Fort Assiniboine	Alberta		
World's Largest Western Boot	Edmonton	Alberta		
Giant Baseball Bat	Edmonton	Alberta		
Giant Horse	Irricana	Alberta		
David Thompson Monument	Lac La Biche	Alberta		
Giant Pumpkin	Smoky Lake	Alberta		
World's First UFO Landing Pad	St. Paul	Alberta	UFO Landing Pad in St. Paul, Alberta. Opened on June 3, 1967.	
Giant perogy	Glendon	Alberta	World's Largest Perogy. Glendon, Alberta, Canada. 27 ft. tall (8.2296 meters), built in 1991.	
Giant Vegreville egg (Pysanka)	Vegreville	Alberta	Vegerville pysanka	1975
Giant potatoes	Vauxhall	Alberta	Vauxhall potatoes	
Giant replica of the Star Trek starship USS Enterprise	Vulcan	Alberta	Enterprise replica in Vulcan	
Giant gopher	Torrington	Alberta		
The Happy Rock	Gladstone	Manitoba	Happy Rock (2935997512)	1993
Canada's Largest Baseball Bat	Battleford	Saskatchewan		
Canada's Largest Baseball Glove	Heisler	Alberta		
Canada's Largest Buffalo	Wainwright	Alberta		
Canada's Largest Dragonfly	Wabamun	Alberta	Dragonfly Sculpture in Wabamun, Alberta	
World's Largest Moose, "Mac the Moose"	Moose Jaw	Saskatchewan	Mac the Moose in Moose Jaw, Saskatchewan	
Battle between Bear and Swan	Swan Hills	Alberta		
Giant Skunk, "Squirt"	Beiseker	Alberta		
Alberta's Largest Northern Pike	Rochon Sands	Alberta		
Giant Cornstalks	Taber	Alberta		
Giant Pinecone	St. Albert	Alberta		
Giant Walleye	Shaw's Point	Alberta		
Giant Crow	Bellevue	Alberta		
Giant Black Diamond	Turner Valley	Alberta		
World’s Largest Fishing Lure	Lacombe	Alberta		
Canada's Largest Turtle, "Ernie"	Turtleford	Saskatchewan		
Canada's Largest coffee pot and cup	Davidson	Saskatchewan		1983
Eddie the Squirrel	Edson	Alberta		

== In popular culture ==
These attractions are referenced in the Kubasonics song "Giants of the Prairies".

The phenomenon was parodied in the sixth episode of the first season of Corner Gas, "World's Biggest Thing". Wherein one of the characters proposes the construction of the "world's biggest hoe" to draw in tourism to the town of Dog River, leaving some citizens unaware of the double entendre the name elicits.

== See also ==
- List of largest roadside attractions
- Novelty architecture
