= Roadside America (disambiguation) =

Roadside America may refer to:

- Roadside America, an indoor miniature village and railway in Shartlesville, Pennsylvania created by Laurence Gieringer in 1935
- Roadside America, a travel book series by American author Doug Kirby

== See also ==
- Roadside attraction
