= Bowlin Travel Centers =

Roadside convenience store chain

Coordinates: 35°4′40.1″N 106°34′5.9″W

Bowlin Travel Centers, Inc.

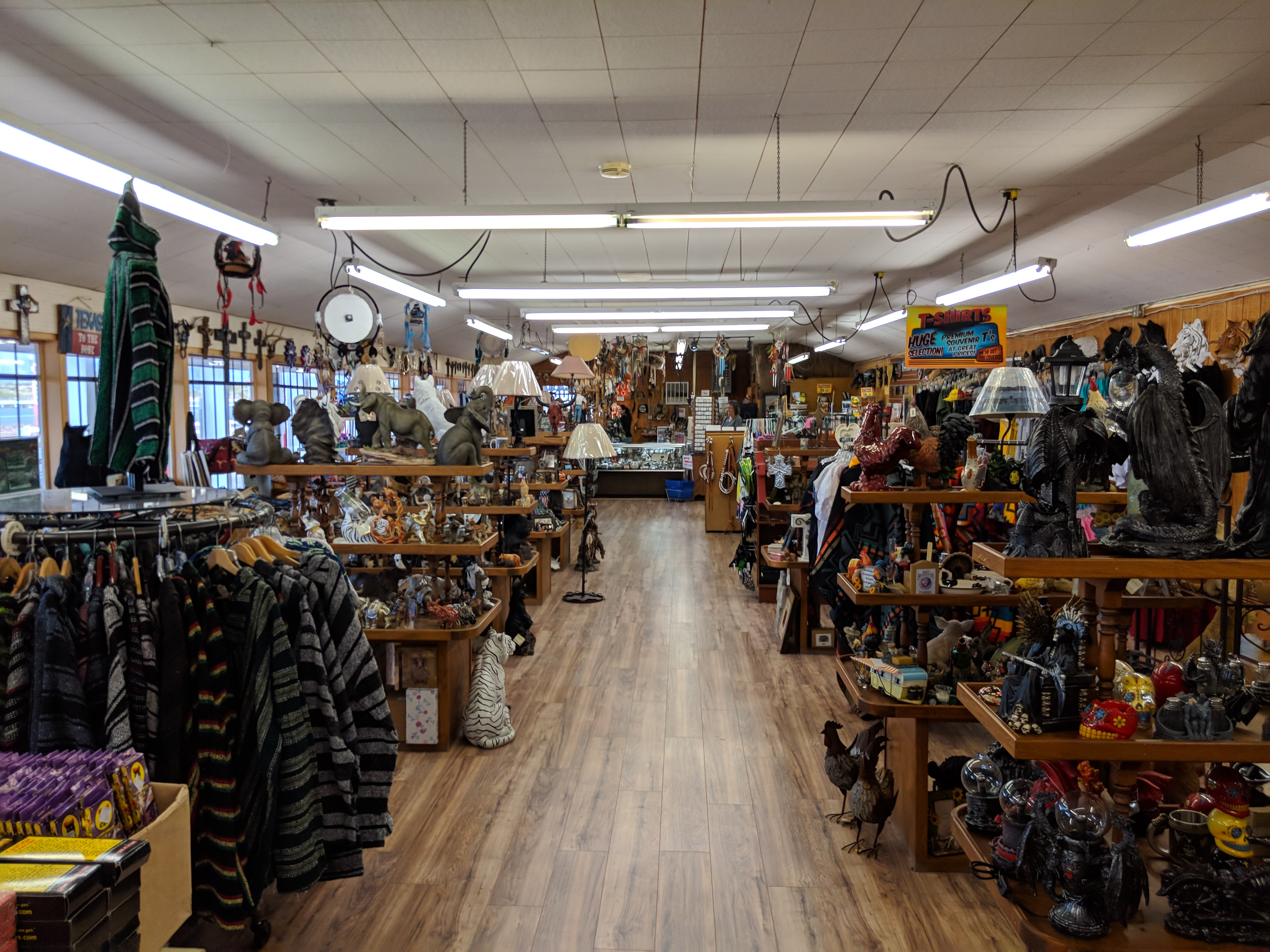
- Inside a Bowlin's Running Indian in Alamogordo, New Mexico
- Company type: Public
- Traded as: OTC Pink Current: BWTL
- Industry: Energy, Retail (Convenience stores)
- Founded: 1912; 114 years ago
- Founder: Claude M. Bowlin
- Headquarters: Albuquerque, New Mexico, United States
- Number of locations: 10
- Area served: Southwestern United States
- Services: Fuel; Fast food Convenience store
- Revenue: $27.5 million (2023)
- Website: www.bowlintc.com

Bowlin Travel Centers, Inc. is a New Mexico–based family owned company that operates a chain of roadside convenience stores and travel centers found on highways in the American southwest. The stores are located primarily in the U.S. states of Arizona and New Mexico; their corporate headquarters are located in Albuquerque. The company's Chief Executive Officer is Michael L. Bowlin.

The stores are located along highways in New Mexico and offer additional amenities such as food from restaurant chains such as Subway, and Dairy Queen. However the Subway location was closed on November 12, 2019.

== History ==
The company's travel centers typically incorporate a Southwestern "trading post" theme, in the manner of small stores commonly found along Old Route 66 prior to the construction of the Interstate. Many were former independent businesses. They have names like "Flying C Ranch", "Old West", "Bowlin's Running Indian", and "Continental Divide". One location, called simply "The Thing" also incorporates another Route 66 tradition, the sideshow. Their retail products include Native American jewellery and food.

In 2003, the company operated 15 locations in Arizona and New Mexico and employed about 150 people in New Mexico; five of those travel centers have since been closed. Stores sell fuel branded Exxon or Shell, and many also incorporate a Dairy Queen.

Prior to 2000, the company operated as Bowlin Outdoor Advertising & Travel Centers Inc., however the Outdoor Advertising division was sold to Lamar Advertising in a stock swap valued at $27.2 million.
