= Bowlin, West Virginia =

Unincorporated community in West Virginia, United States

- Unincorporated community
- Location within West Virginia Location within the United States
- Coordinates: 37°59′38″N 81°7′28″W
- Country: United States
- State: West Virginia
- County: Fayette
- Elevation: 2,083 ft (635 m)
- Time zone: UTC-5 (Eastern (EST))
  - Summer (DST): UTC-4 (EDT)
- GNIS ID: 1556057

Bowlin is an unincorporated community in Fayette County, West Virginia, United States.
