= Roadside attraction =

Roadside attraction area for visitors

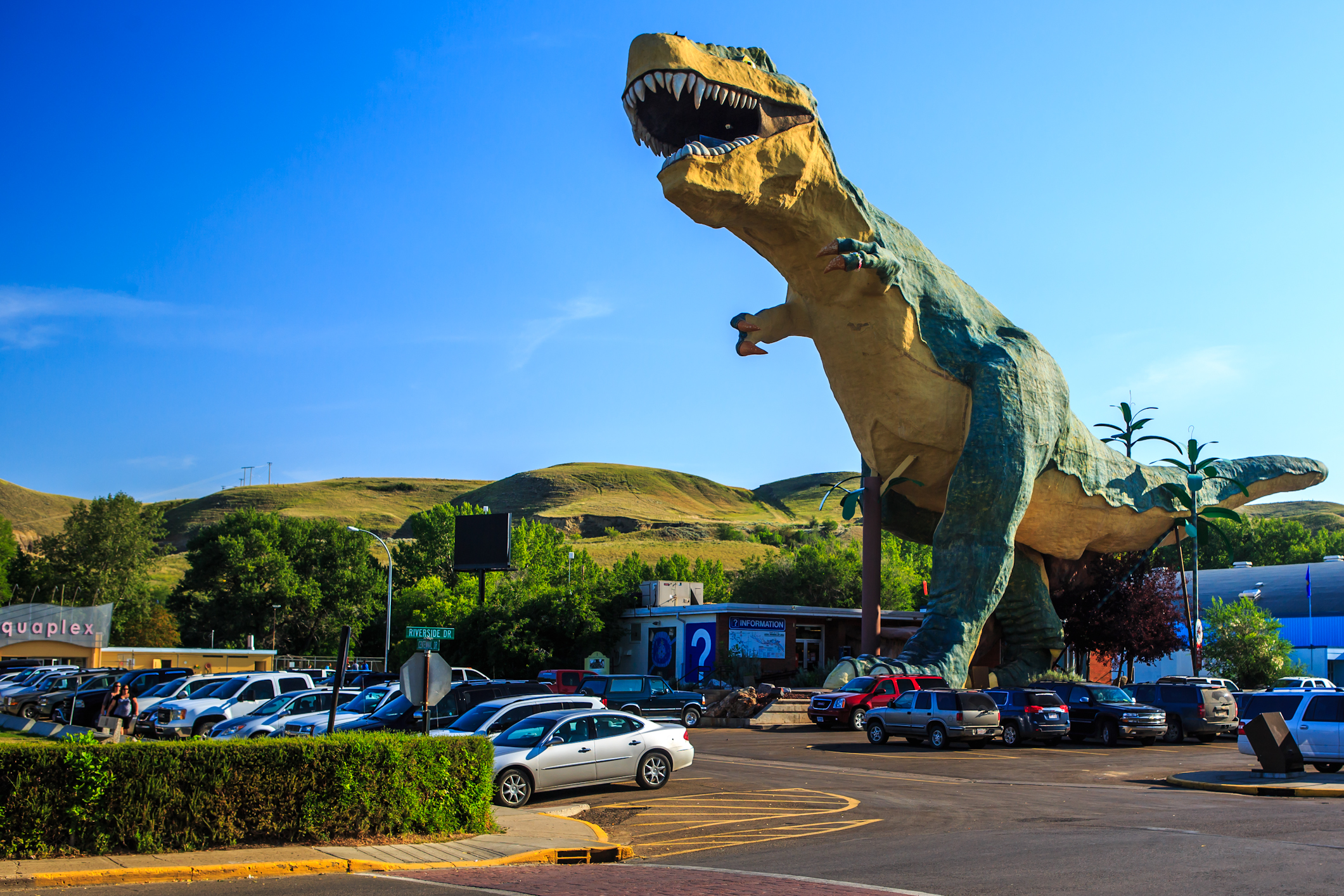
World's Largest Dinosaur, a roadside attraction in Drumheller, Alberta

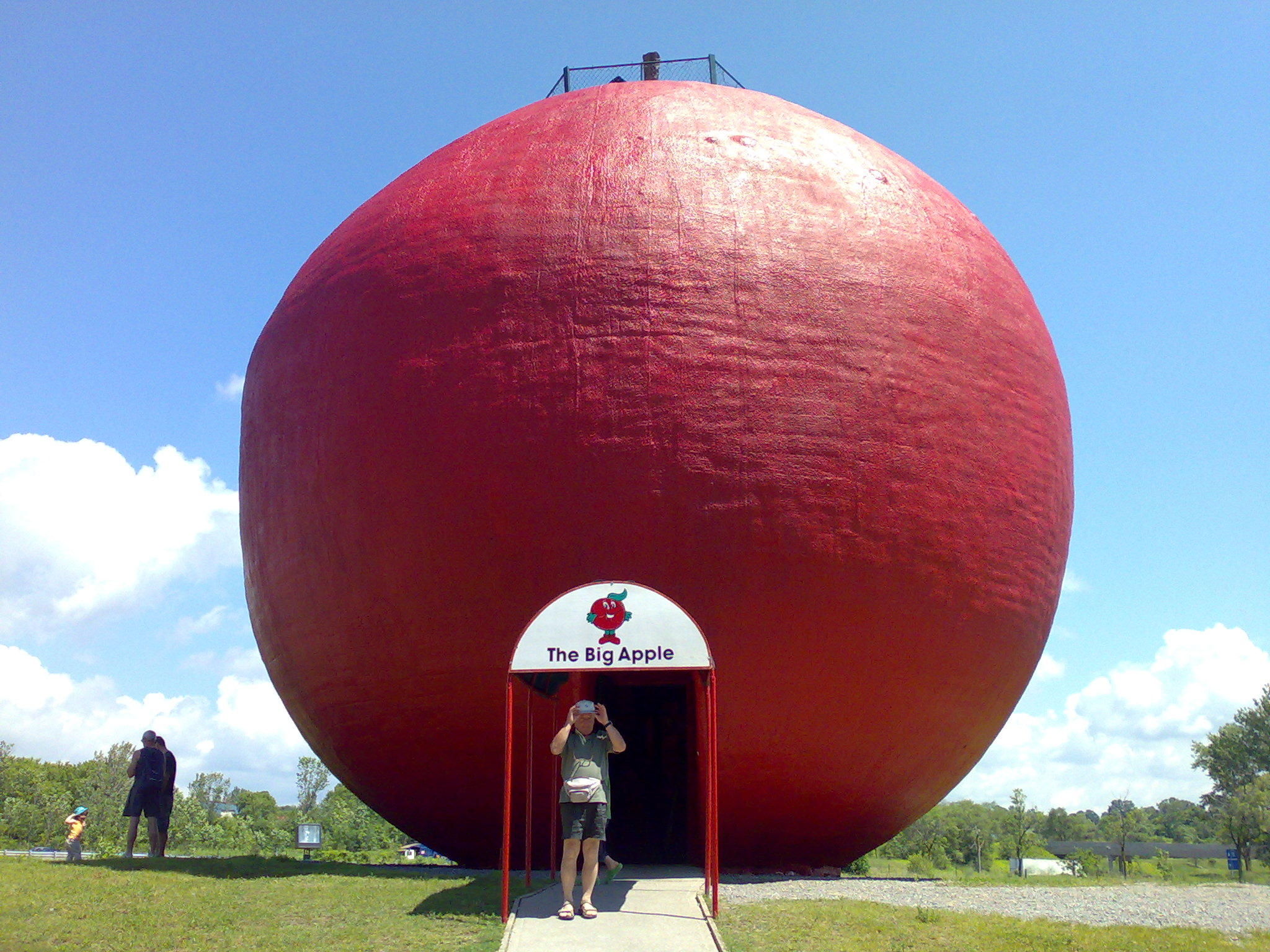
Big Apple in Cramahe, Ontario

A roadside attraction is a feature along the side of a road meant to attract tourists. In general, these are places one might stop on the way to somewhere, rather than being a destination. They are frequently advertised with billboards. The modern tourist-oriented highway attraction originated as a U.S. and Canadian phenomenon in the 1940s to 1960s, and subsequently caught on in Australia. Elsewhere, similar items may be placed on roundabouts and traffic islands in crowded cities.

== History ==
When long-distance road travel became practical and popular in the 1920s, entrepreneurs began building restaurants, motels, coffee shops, cafes, and unusual businesses to attract travelers. Many of the buildings were attractions in themselves in the form of novelty architecture, depicting everyday objects of enormous size, typically relating to the items sold there. Some other types of roadside attractions include monuments and fictionalized-paranormal/illusionary amusements such as the Mystery Spot near Santa Cruz, California, or curiosities such as The Thing? along Interstate 10 in Arizona.

With the construction of the U.S. Interstate Highway System in the mid-1950s, many roadside attractions were bypassed and quickly went out of business. Some remained attractive enough to divert travelers from the interstate for a brief respite and thus remain in business. The best example of this change is along US Route 66, where in the southwest, Interstate 40 provided for non-stop travel. In 2017, the publication Best Life listed 33 top roadside attractions in the U.S. Among those listed were Lucy the Elephant, Margate, New Jersey; Cabazon Dinosaurs, Cabazon, California; Oregon Vortex, Gold Hill, Oregon; Jolly Green Giant, Blue Earth, Minnesota; and Secret Caverns, Howes Cave, New York.

Shrinking small towns have built roadside attractions to "foster civic pride", "make our own fun...especially in the middle of winter", and "make it interesting for people to come and move here". Examples include Big Tom, a 22-foot-tall turkey in Frazee, Minnesota; a collection of giant items including a wind chime, mailbox, golf tee, and pitchfork, in Casey, Illinois; and a giant sugar beet in Halstad, Minnesota. Other Minnesota supersized attractions include a giant loon, otter, prairie chicken, crow, pelican, and three Paul Bunyans. Giant balls of twine are located in four Midwestern states. The Enchanted Highway in North Dakota comprises a 32-mile (51 km) pathway of roadside sculpture.

== See also ==
- Another Roadside Attraction, 1971 novel by Tom Robbins
- Another Roadside Attraction (festival), Canadian music festival
- Australia's big things, novelty architecture, and large sculptures in Australia
- Enchanted Highway, a collection of scrap metal sculptures along an unnumbered stretch of highway in North Dakota
- Giants of the Prairies, novelty architecture, and large sculptures in Canada
- John Margolies, whose 13,000+ photographs of roadside attractions in the United States are now in the public domain
- List of largest roadside attractions (international)
- Novelty architecture
- Roadside America (disambiguation)
- Tourist trap
- Wall Drug
- What Were They Thinking?, a Canadian comedy television series which profiled roadside attractions
