= Pierson Building Center giant hammer =

American home improvement center and roadside attraction

Coordinates: 40.768975°N 124.191767°W

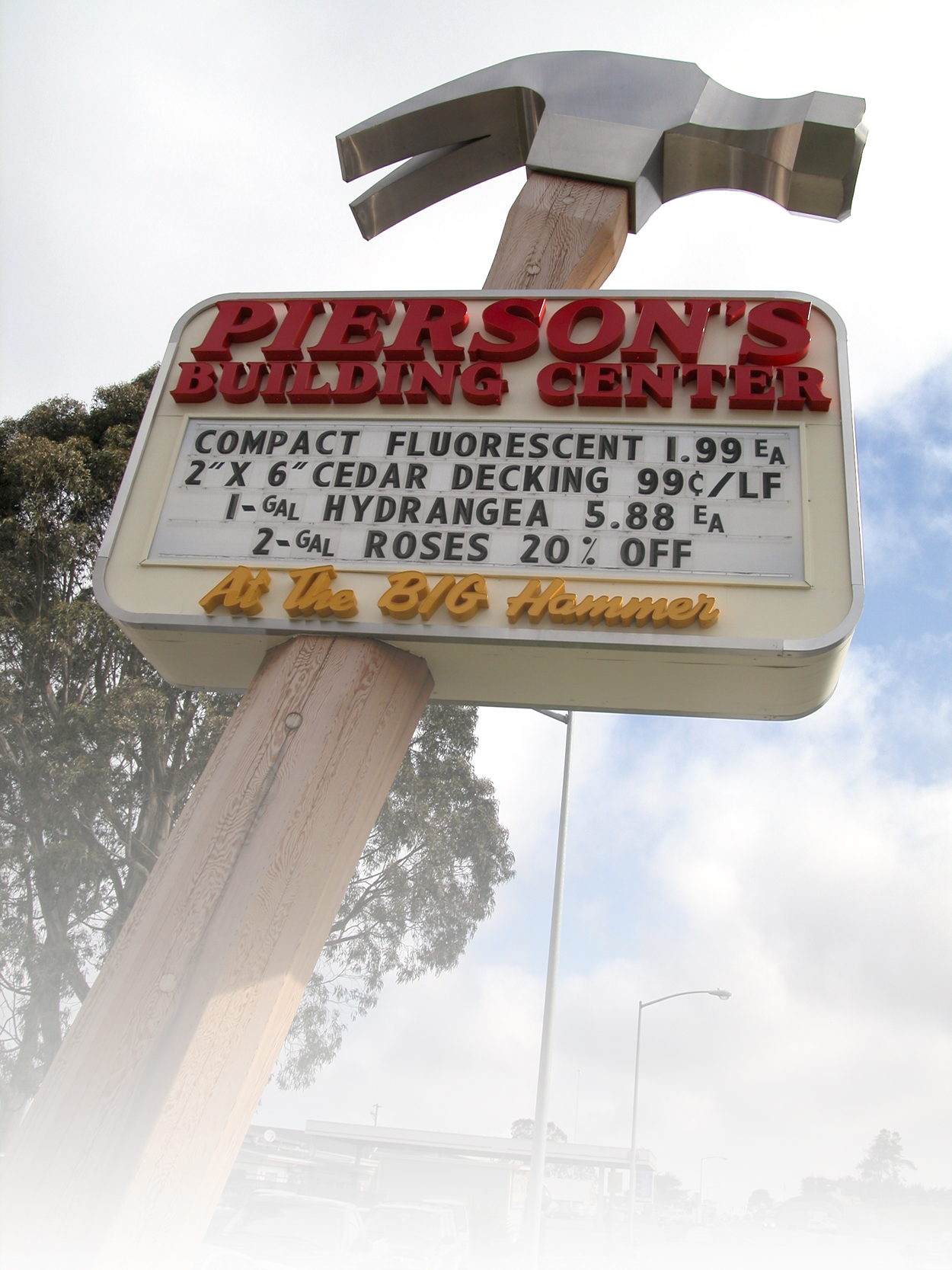
World's Largest Hammer

Pierson Building Center, a locally owned and operated home improvement center in Eureka, California, is home to the World's Largest Hammer.

The hammer, designed and built by Randy Brigl of Eugene, Oregon, is a replica of a Vaughan claw hammer (No. D020) and stands 26 feet tall (30 feet overall including the concrete foundation). The octagon-shaped handle is made of real solid wood and is reinforced with a metal I-beam. The hammer's head was fabricated from 18-gauge brushed stainless steel and measures 10 feet, 3 inches in length. All dimensions of the replica are in exact proportion to the original Vaughan hammer.

The hammer was permanently mounted in front of the business on November 12, 1991. It serves as the store's symbol as well as its sign post. Store specials and information are posted on the 12 foot by 7 foot backlit sign that is built into the hammer.

The Big Hammer briefly became a character in the nationally syndicated comic strip Zippy the Pinhead by Bill Griffith. The character appeared in two strips in August, 2001.

== See also ==
- List of world's largest roadside attractions
- Roadside attraction
