= List of largest roadside attractions =

This is a list of verifiably notable roadside attractions.

== Asia ==
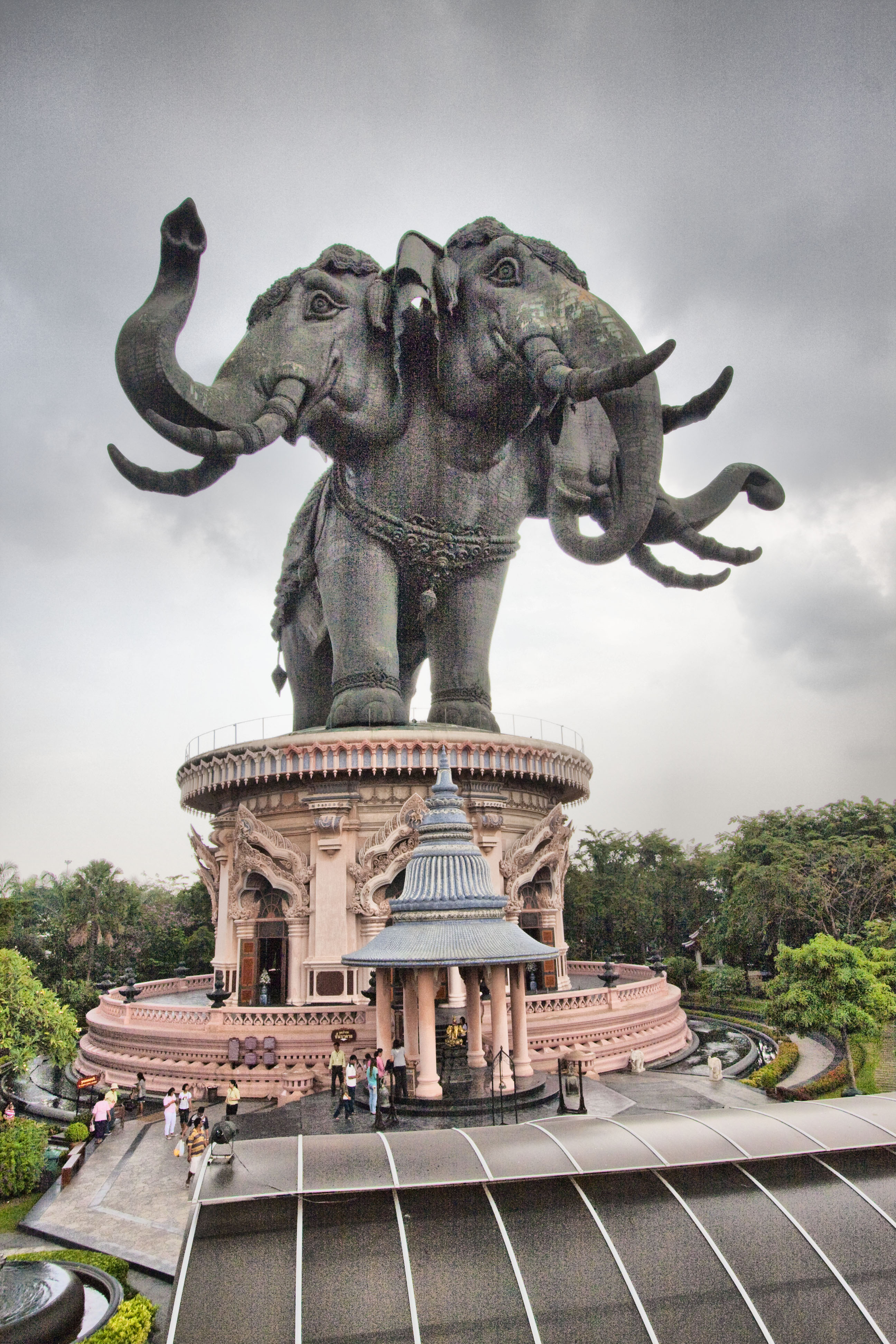
Three-headed elephant of Erawan Museum, Thailand

=== Thailand ===
- Great Buddha of Thailand

== Europe ==
=== Belgium ===
- Atomium: a 165 billion times magnification of an iron crystal, Brussels

== North America ==
=== Canada ===
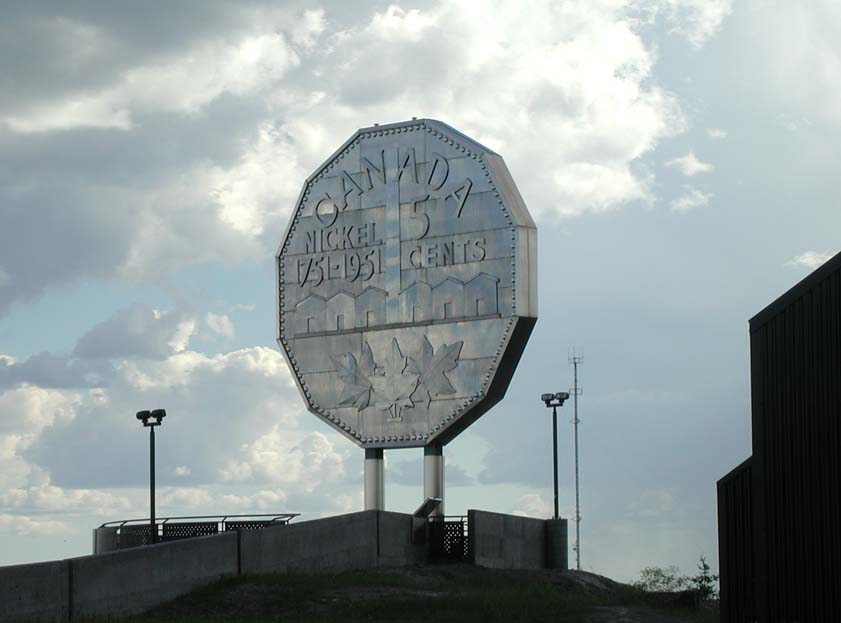
The Big Nickel is a 9-metre-tall (30 ft) replica of a Canadian nickel.

==== Alberta ====
- World's Largest Dinosaur, Drumheller, Alberta
- Vegreville egg (Ukrainian Easter egg, Pysanky), Vegreville, Alberta
- World's Largest Perogy, Glendon, Alberta
- Saamis Teepee, Medicine Hat, Alberta

==== British Columbia ====
- The World's Largest Tin Soldier, New Westminster, British Columbia

==== New Brunswick ====
- World's largest axe, Nackawic-Millville, New Brunswick
- The World's Largest Lobster, Shediac, New Brunswick
- Shep (Semipalmated sandpiper), Dorchester, New Brunswick
- Big Potato Man, Maugerville

==== Ontario ====
- Big Apple, Cramahe, Ontario
- Big Nickel, Sudbury, Ontario

==== Manitoba ====
- The World's Largest Coke Can, Portage la Prairie, Manitoba

=== United States ===
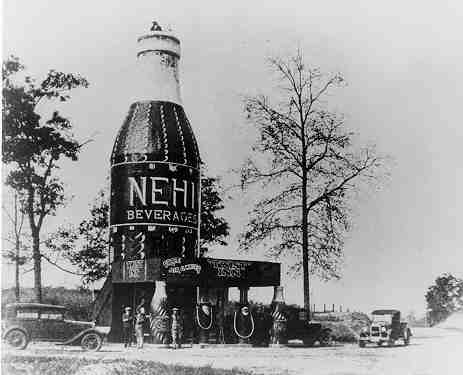
Built in 1924, The Bottle, also known as the Nehi Inn, was one of the first "world's largest" roadside attractions. Despite the attraction itself being destroyed by fire in 1933, the community of The Bottle, Alabama, still bears the name of its famous attraction.

==== Alabama ====
- World's Largest Office Chair, Anniston

==== California ====
- World's Largest Hammer, Eureka
- World's largest paper cup, Riverside
- World's Tallest Thermometer, Baker

==== Georgia ====
- Big Chicken, Marietta

==== Iowa ====
- World's Largest Strawberry, Strawberry Point, IA

==== Illinois ====
- Brooks Catsup Bottle water tower, Collinsville
- World's Largest Clogs, Casey
- World's Largest Crochet Hook, Casey
- World's Largest Golf Tee, Casey
- World's Largest Knitting Needles, Casey
- World's Largest Mailbox, Casey
- World's Largest Pitchfork, Casey
- World's Largest Rocking Chair, Casey
- World's largest windchime, Casey
- World's Largest Superman Statue, Metropolis, Illinois
- World's Largest Covered Wagon, Lincoln

==== Indiana ====
- World’s Largest Ball of Paint, Alexandria, Indiana

==== Kansas ====
- Biggest ball of twine, Cawker City
- World’s Largest Easel, Goodland, Kansas

==== Michigan ====
- Uniroyal Giant Tire, Allen Park
- Grand Haven Musical Fountain, Grand Haven

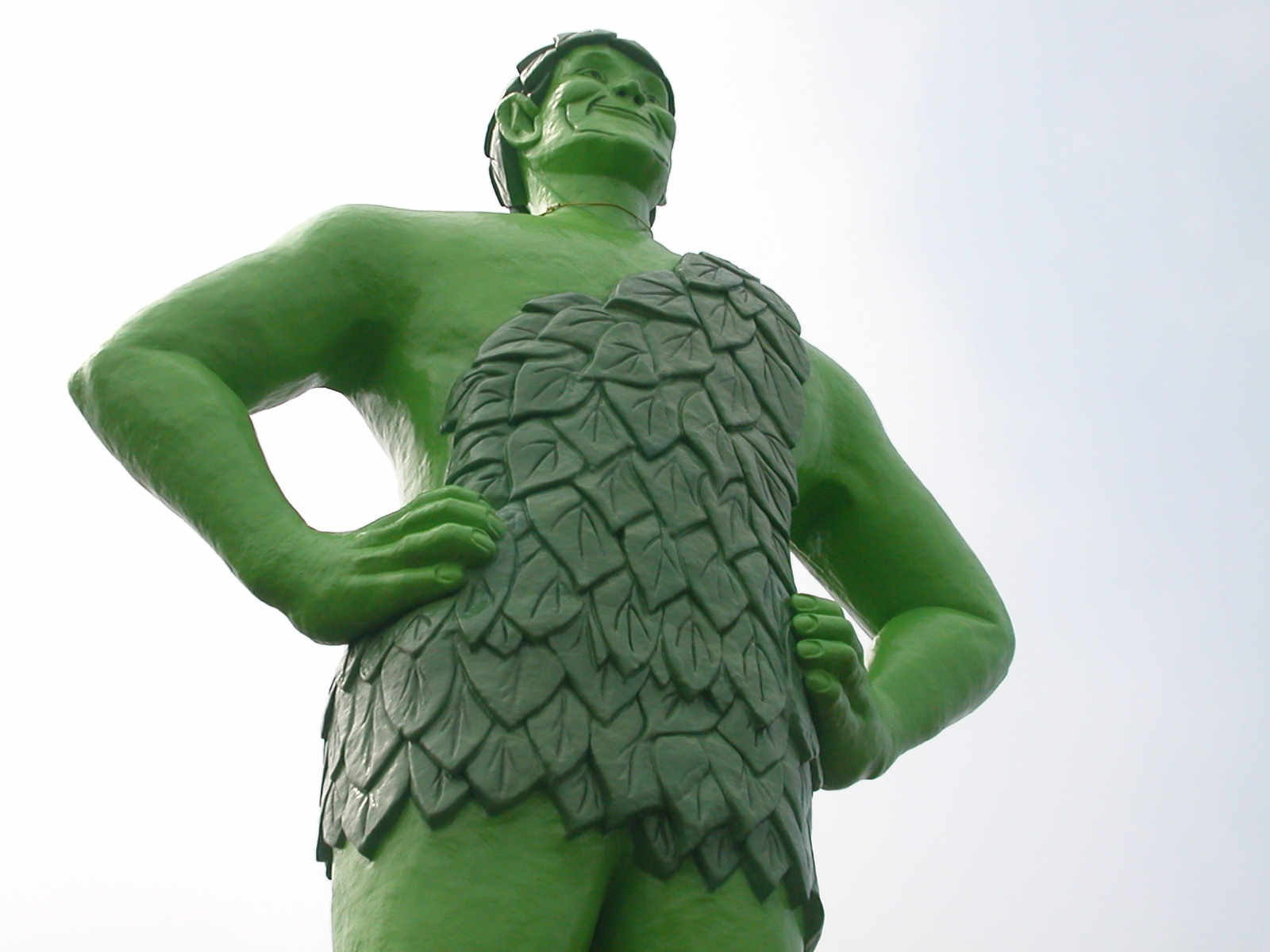
55-foot (17 m) fiberglass statue of the Jolly Green Giant in Blue Earth, Minnesota

==== Minnesota ====
- Biggest ball of twine (made by one man), Darwin
- Iron Man, Chisholm
- Pelican Pete, Pelican Rapids
- Nevis Tiger Muskie, Nevis
- Soudan Underground Mine State Park, Soudan

==== Missouri ====
- World's Largest Chess Piece, St. Louis
- World's Largest Fork, Springfield
- World's Largest Goose Sculpture, Sumner
- World's Largest Roll of Toilet Paper, Branson
- World's Largest Rooster Sculpture, Branson
- World's Largest 8 Ball, Tipton

==== New Jersey ====
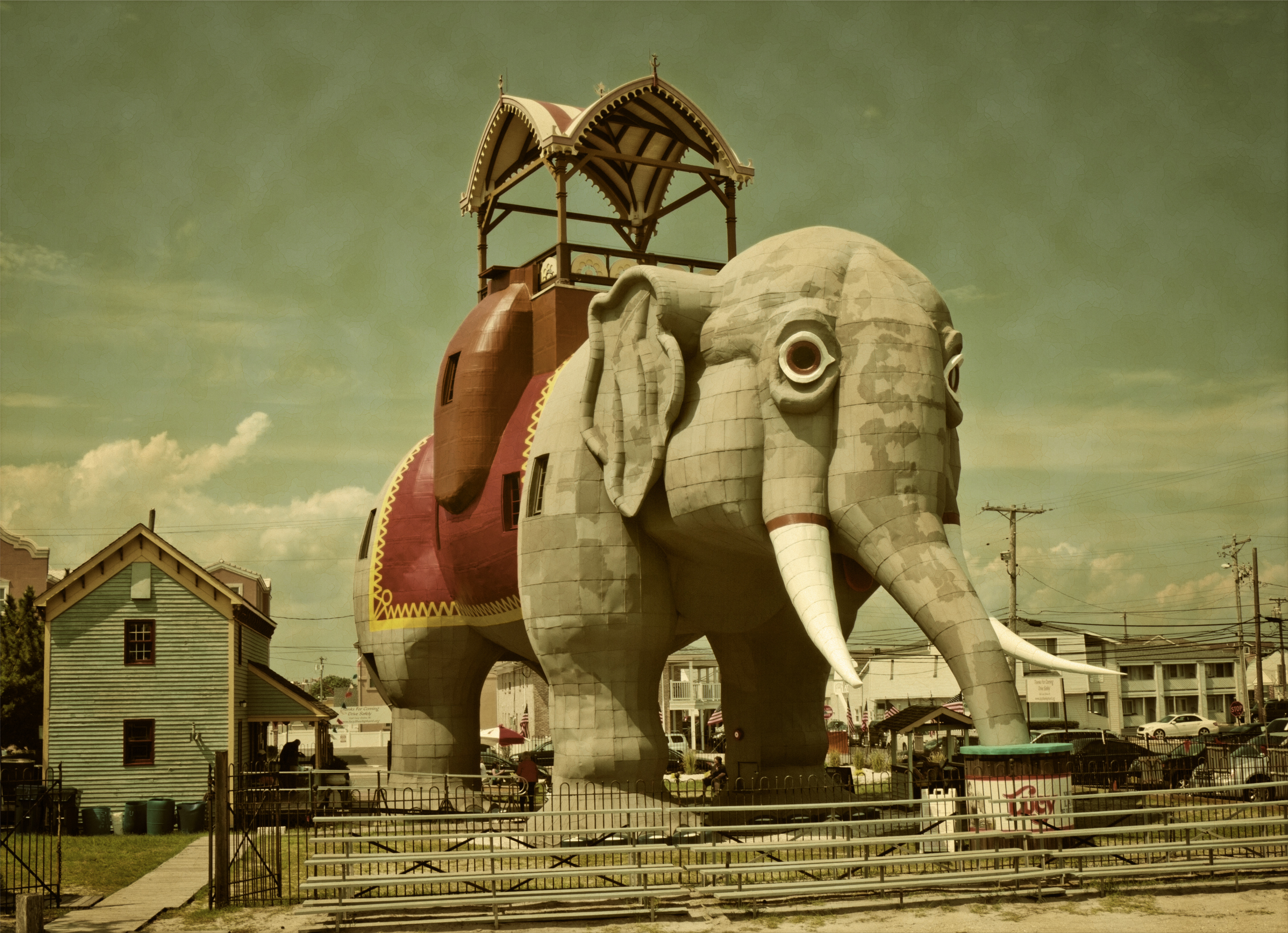
Lucy the Elephant, Margate, New Jersey

- Union Watersphere, Union (contested)
- Lucy the Elephant, Margate City

==== New Mexico ====
- World's Largest Pistachio, Alamogordo

==== New York ====
- Big Duck, Flanders, New York

==== North Dakota ====
- Enchanted Highway, a collection of "world's largest" scrap-metal sculptures of everyday objects
- Salem Sue, New Salem, North Dakota
- World's Largest Buffalo, Jamestown
- World's Largest Sandhill Crane, Steele

==== Ohio ====
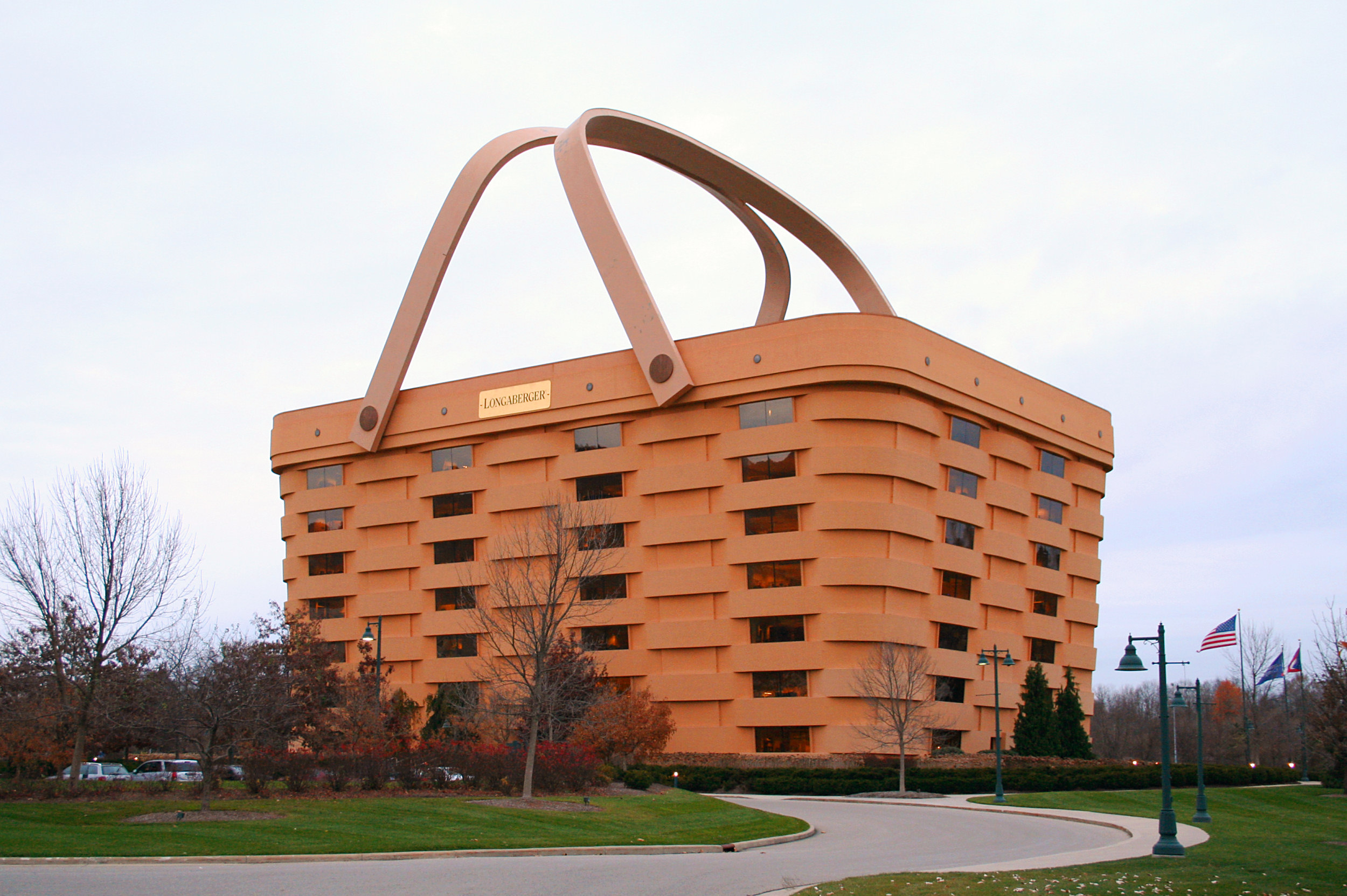
World's largest basket, Newark, Ohio

==== Rhode Island ====
- Big Blue Bug, Providence

==== Washington ====
- Hat 'n' Boots, Seattle

==== West Virginia ====
- Chester teapot, Chester

==== Wisconsin ====
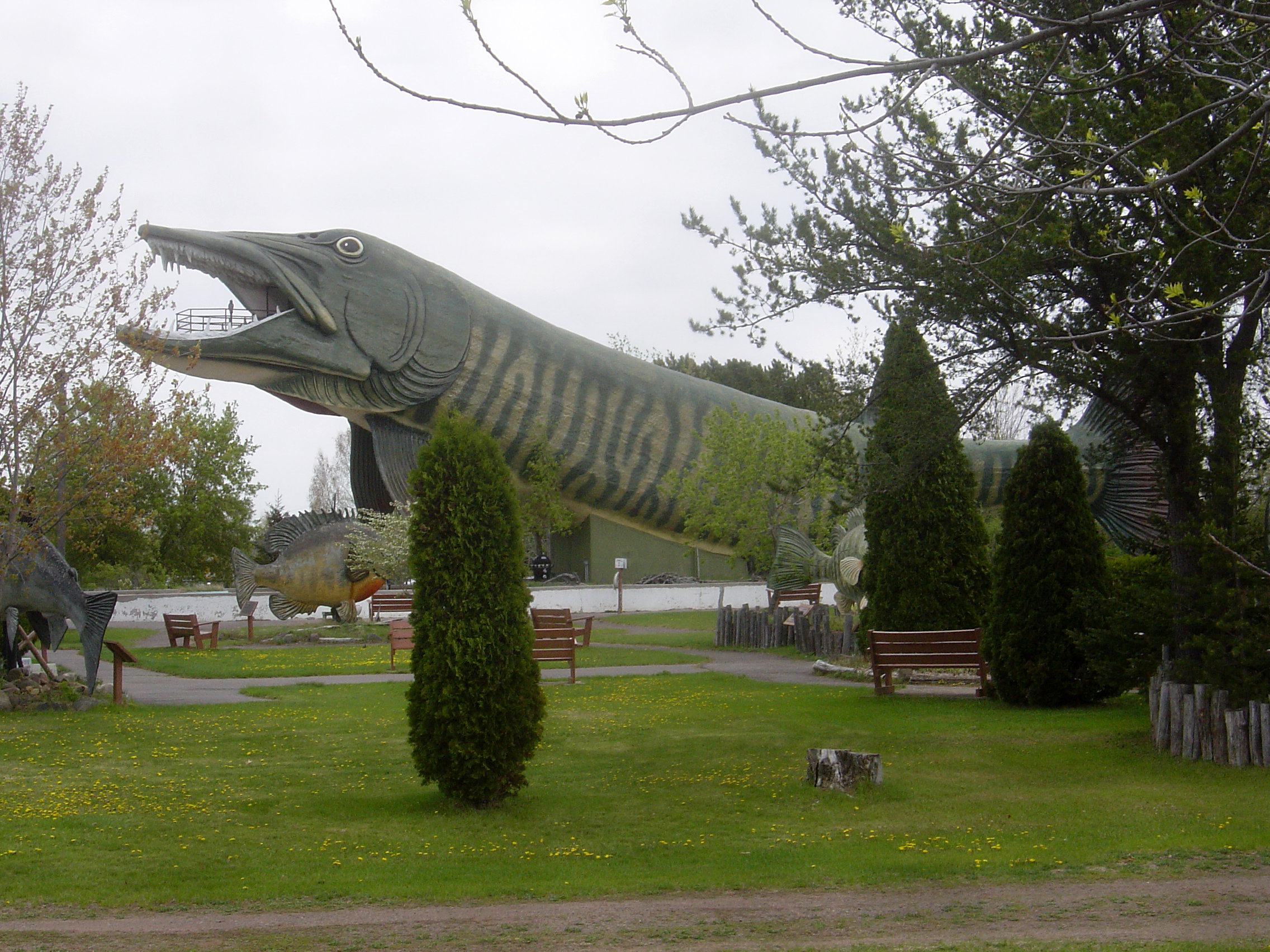
The World's Largest Musky, at the National Freshwater Fishing Hall of Fame; Hayward, Wisconsin

- Tallest Grandfather Clock, Kewaunee, Wisconsin

== See also ==
- "Giants of the Prairies", a polka by the Kubasonics
- List of gravity hills
- Novelty architecture
