= The Amazing Race 8 =

Season of television series

- Season 8
- Region 1 DVD cover
- Presented by: Phil Keoghan
- No. of teams: 10
- Winners: Nick, Alex, Megan, and Tommy Linz
- No. of legs: 11
- Distance traveled: 11,000 mi (18,000 km)
- No. of episodes: 11

Release
- Original network: CBS
- Original release: September 27 – December 13, 2005

Additional information
- Filming dates: July 7 – July 31, 2005

Series chronology
- ← Previous; Season 7 Next → Season 9

The Amazing Race 8 (also known as The Amazing Race: Family Edition) is the eighth season of the American reality competition show The Amazing Race. Hosted by Phil Keoghan, it featured ten families of four, including minors as young as eight years old, competing in a race across North America. This season visited twelve states, one federal district, and three additional countries, traveling approximately 11,000 miles (18,000 km) over eleven legs. Filming took place from July 7 to 31, 2005. Starting in New York City, racers traveled through the United States, Panama, Costa Rica, and Canada, before finishing in Lewiston, New York. The season premiered on CBS on September 27, 2005, and concluded on December 13, 2005.

Siblings Nick, Alex, Megan, and Tommy Linz were the winners of this season; while father Wally Branson and his three daughters, Beth, Lauren, and Lindsay, finished in second place; and widow Linda Weaver and her three children, Rebecca, Rachel, and Rolly, finished in third place.

== Format ==
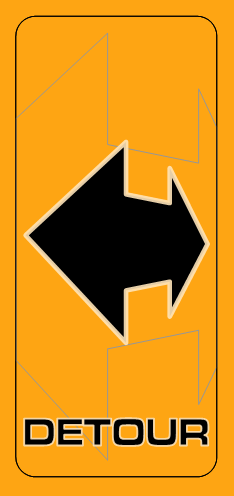
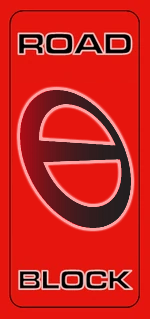
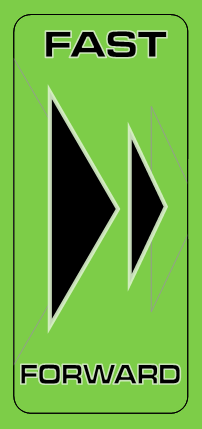
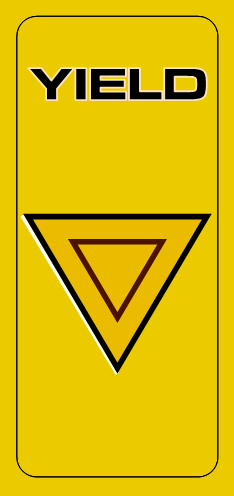
The clues which contestants receive during the course of the race generally fall into five categories: Route Info, Detour, Roadblock, Fast Forward, and Yield.

The Amazing Race is a reality television show created by Bertram van Munster and Elise Doganieri, and hosted by Phil Keoghan. The series normally follows teams of two competing in a race around the world. However, this season featured teams of four and the competition was limited to North America. Each leg of the race requires teams to deduce clues, navigate foreign environments, interact with locals, perform physical and mental challenges, and travel on a limited budget provided by the show. At each stop during the leg, teams receive clues inside sealed envelopes, which fall into one of these categories:

- Route Info: These are simple instructions that teams must follow before they can receive their next clue.
- Detour: A Detour is a choice between two tasks. Teams may choose either task and switch tasks if they find one option too difficult. There is usually one Detour present on each leg.
- Roadblock: A Roadblock is a task that only one team member can complete. Teams must choose which member will complete the task based on a brief clue they receive before fully learning the details of the task. There is usually one Roadblock present on each leg.
- Fast Forward: A Fast Forward is a task that only one team may complete, which allows that team to skip all remaining tasks on the leg and go directly to the next Pit Stop. Teams may only claim one Fast Forward during the entire race.
- Yield: The Yield allows one team to force another team to stop racing for a predetermined amount of time before they can continue the race. Teams may use the Yield only one time during the entire race.

Most teams who arrive last at the Pit Stop of each leg are progressively eliminated, while the first team to arrive at the finish line in the final episode wins the grand prize of US$1,000,000.

== Production ==
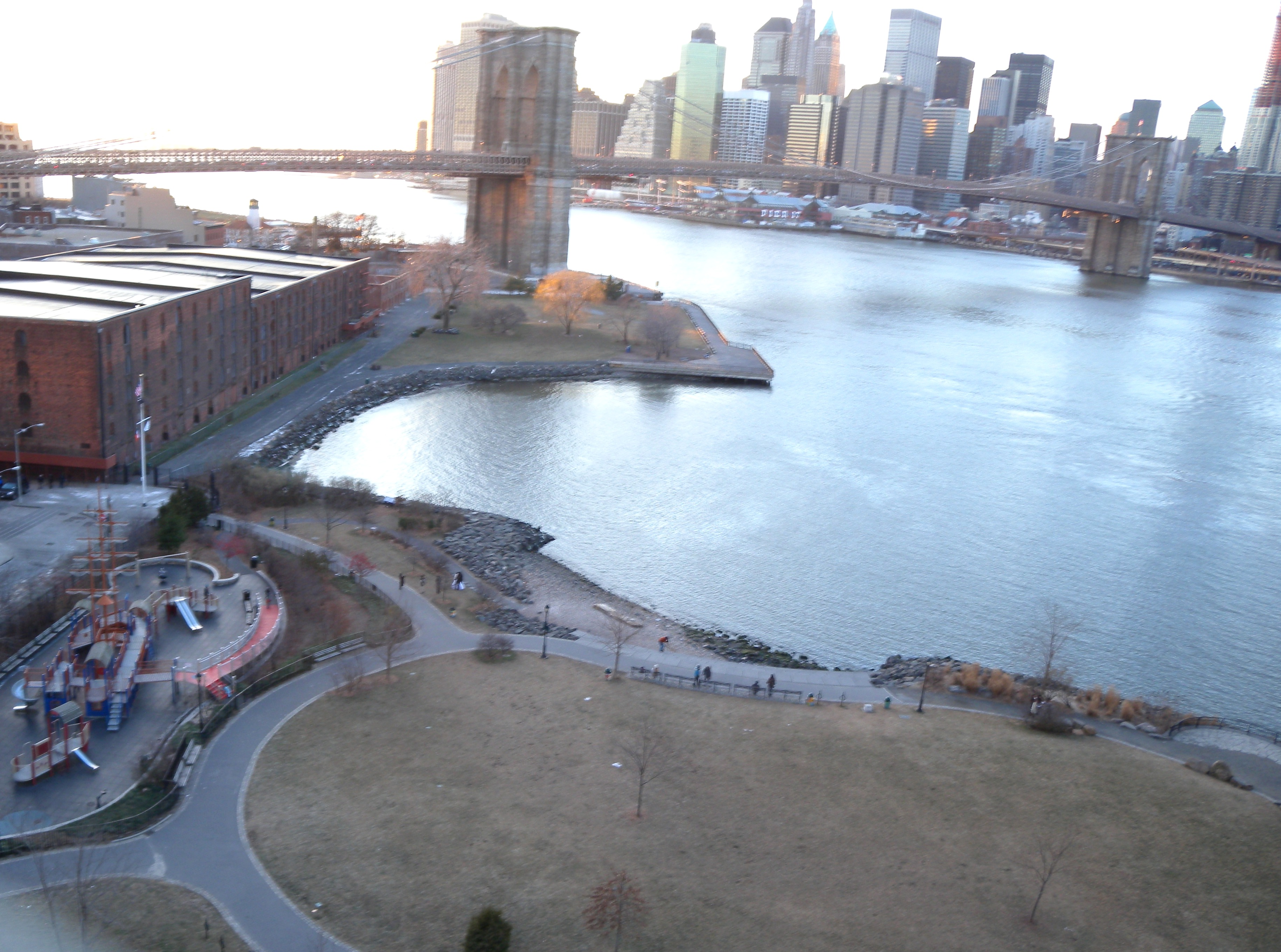
The Starting Line of The Amazing Race: Family Edition was at Empire–Fulton Ferry State Park close to the Brooklyn Bridge in New York City.

The eighth season of The Amazing Race spanned 11,000 miles (18,000 km). This season placed much less emphasis on international travel as numerous legs were contained within the continental United States, and all locations were in North America, with Panama and Costa Rica visited for the first time. Casting for this season took place in early 2005 with team members as young as eight allowed to apply. Casting closed on March 11, 2005. Filming began on July 7, 2005, with reports of the show at Washington Crossing State Park in New Jersey. From July 12 to 13, teams were in Alabama. Filming concluded after 25 days on July 31.

Route Markers were colored yellow and white with black lining in contrast to the yellow and red markers used in all other seasons. For this season, the supplied credit card covered not only airfare, but also gasoline, which otherwise would have had to be purchased with cash. This rule change was made necessary by the fact that most of the transportation took place in automobiles rather than airplanes.

During the first leg, Renee Rogers fell at the starting line and suffered a concussion. She did not realize the severity of the injury until she went to a hospital after being eliminated the next leg.

This season featured a visit to New Orleans, Louisiana, in the fourth and fifth legs, where filming occurred about a month before Hurricane Katrina struck the region. The episodes aired after the hurricane had devastated the region. A special message was inserted at the beginning of the episodes, including one spoken by Phil Keoghan, dedicating them to the victims and to those helping with the recovery. The Schroeder family, who were from New Orleans, had befriended the Rogers family from Shreveport in northern Louisiana during the season. As Hurricane Katrina neared landfall, the Rogers family offered the Schroeders safety at their home. Hurricane Katrina wiped out the Schroeders' home and most of their possessions, and after staying with the Rogerses for about two weeks, they were able to find more permanent housing in Baton Rouge, and most of the other teams from this season chipped in to help the family.

According to an interview with Wally Bransen on RFF Radio, producers had originally planned a leg in Belize, but had to cancel it due to Hurricane Emily.

== Contestants ==
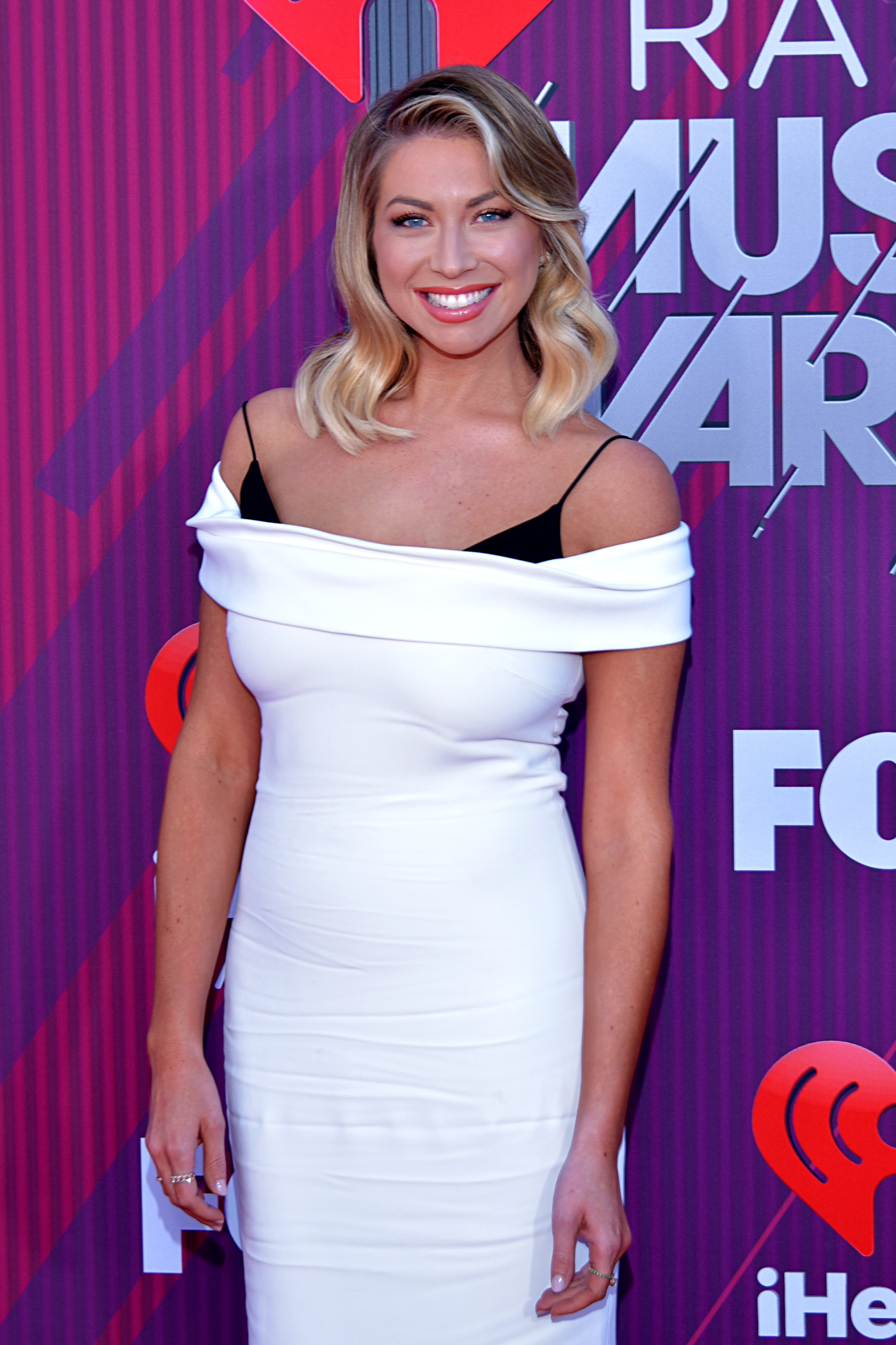
Stassi Schroeder

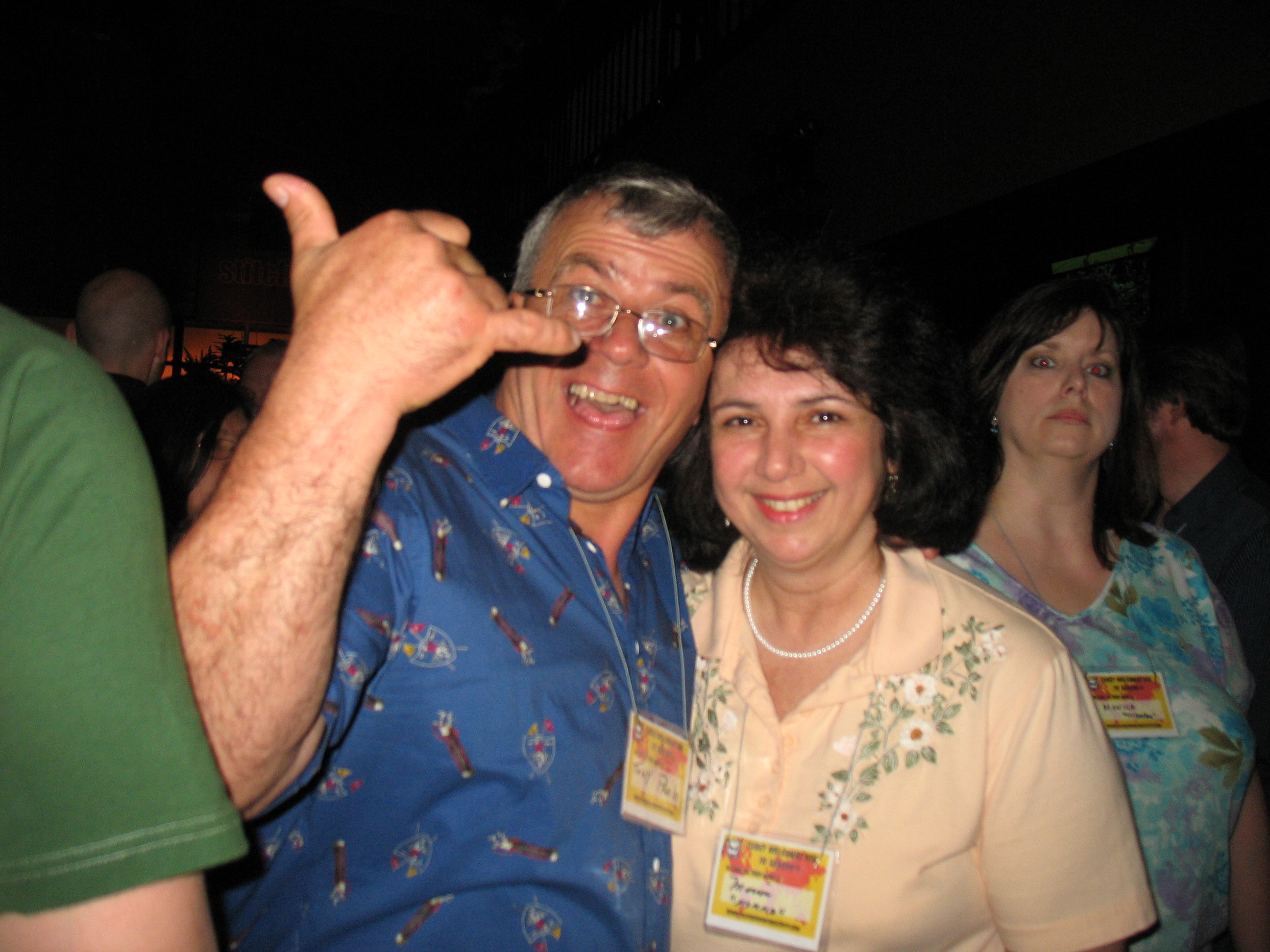
Tony and Marion Paolo

This season's cast consisted of ten teams of four family members each.

Contestants	Age	Relationship	Hometown	Status
Reggie Black	42	Dad, Mom & Kids	Woodbridge, Virginia	Eliminated 1st (in Lancaster, Pennsylvania)
Kimberly Black	40	Dad, Mom & Kids	Woodbridge, Virginia	Eliminated 1st (in Lancaster, Pennsylvania)
Kenneth Black	11	Dad, Mom & Kids	Woodbridge, Virginia	Eliminated 1st (in Lancaster, Pennsylvania)
Austin Black	8	Dad, Mom & Kids	Woodbridge, Virginia	Eliminated 1st (in Lancaster, Pennsylvania)
Denny Rogers	46	Dad, Mom & Kids	Shreveport, Louisiana	Eliminated 2nd (in Middleburg, Virginia)
Renee Rogers	42	Dad, Mom & Kids	Shreveport, Louisiana	Eliminated 2nd (in Middleburg, Virginia)
Brittney Rogers	22	Dad, Mom & Kids	Shreveport, Louisiana	Eliminated 2nd (in Middleburg, Virginia)
Brock Rogers	19	Dad, Mom & Kids	Shreveport, Louisiana	Eliminated 2nd (in Middleburg, Virginia)
Tony Aiello	57	Father and Sons-in-Law	Mansfield, Massachusetts	Eliminated 3rd (in Huntsville, Alabama)
Kevin Kempskie	31	Father and Sons-in-Law	Mansfield, Massachusetts	Eliminated 3rd (in Huntsville, Alabama)
Matt Hanson	31	Father and Sons-in-Law	Mansfield, Massachusetts	Eliminated 3rd (in Huntsville, Alabama)
David Alverson	26	Father and Sons-in-Law	Mansfield, Massachusetts	Eliminated 3rd (in Huntsville, Alabama)
Mark Schroeder	40	Dad, Stepmom & Kids	New Orleans, Louisiana	Eliminated 4th (in New Orleans, Louisiana)
Char Schroeder	39	Dad, Stepmom & Kids	New Orleans, Louisiana	Eliminated 4th (in New Orleans, Louisiana)
Stassi Schroeder	17	Dad, Stepmom & Kids	New Orleans, Louisiana	Eliminated 4th (in New Orleans, Louisiana)
Hunter Schroeder	15	Dad, Stepmom & Kids	New Orleans, Louisiana	Eliminated 4th (in New Orleans, Louisiana)
Bill Gaghan	40	Dad, Mom & Kids	Glastonbury, Connecticut	Eliminated 5th (in Quepos, Costa Rica)
Tammy Gaghan	42	Dad, Mom & Kids	Glastonbury, Connecticut	Eliminated 5th (in Quepos, Costa Rica)
Billy Gaghan, Jr.	12	Dad, Mom & Kids	Glastonbury, Connecticut	Eliminated 5th (in Quepos, Costa Rica)
Carissa Gaghan	9	Dad, Mom & Kids	Glastonbury, Connecticut	Eliminated 5th (in Quepos, Costa Rica)
Tony Paolo	52	Dad, Mom & Kids	Carmel, New York	Eliminated 6th (in Page, Arizona)
Marion Paolo	52	Dad, Mom & Kids	Carmel, New York	Eliminated 6th (in Page, Arizona)
D.J. Paolo	24	Dad, Mom & Kids	Carmel, New York	Eliminated 6th (in Page, Arizona)
Brian Paolo	16	Dad, Mom & Kids	Carmel, New York	Eliminated 6th (in Page, Arizona)
Michelle Godlewski	42	Sisters	Des Plaines, Illinois	Eliminated 7th (in Absarokee, Montana)
Sharon Godlewski	39	Sisters	Des Plaines, Illinois	Eliminated 7th (in Absarokee, Montana)
Christine Godlewski	37	Sisters	Des Plaines, Illinois	Eliminated 7th (in Absarokee, Montana)
Tricia Godlewski	26	Sisters	Des Plaines, Illinois	Eliminated 7th (in Absarokee, Montana)
Linda Weaver	46	Widow & Kids	Ormond Beach, Florida	Third place
Rebecca Weaver	19	Widow & Kids	Ormond Beach, Florida	Third place
Rachel Weaver	16	Widow & Kids	Ormond Beach, Florida	Third place
Rolly Weaver IV	14	Widow & Kids	Ormond Beach, Florida	Third place
Wally Bransen	51	Dad & Daughters	Park Ridge, Illinois	Runners-up
Beth Bransen	25	Dad & Daughters	Park Ridge, Illinois	Runners-up
Lauren Bransen	22	Dad & Daughters	Park Ridge, Illinois	Runners-up
Lindsay Bransen	20	Dad & Daughters	Park Ridge, Illinois	Runners-up
Nick Linz	24	Siblings	Cincinnati, Ohio	Winners
Alex Linz	22	Siblings	Cincinnati, Ohio	Winners
Megan Linz	21	Siblings	Cincinnati, Ohio	Winners
Tommy Linz	19	Siblings	Cincinnati, Ohio	Winners

Future appearances

Stassi Schroeder later appeared in the Oxygen reality series Queen Bees, as well as the Bravo reality series Vanderpump Rules, where she as a cast member for eight seasons. In 2011, Brian and Marion Paolo appeared on the HGTV reality show House Hunters. Billy and Carissa Gaghan wrote introductions for My Ox Is Broken, a book about The Amazing Race.

== Results ==
The following teams are listed with their placements in each leg. Placements are listed in finishing order.

- A red placement with a dagger (†) indicates that the team was eliminated.
- An underlined blue placement with a double-dagger (‡) indicates that the team was the last to arrive at a Pit Stop in a non-elimination leg. As a penalty, they were stripped of their money, bags, and possessions other than their passports and the clothes they were wearing upon checking in, and they received no money at the start of the next leg.
- An italicized placement indicates a team's placement at the midpoint of a double leg.
- A green ƒ indicates that the team won the Fast Forward.
- A brown > indicates that the team used the Yield and a brown < indicates the team on the receiving end of the Yield.

Team placement (by leg)
Team	1	2	3	4	5	6	7	8	9	10a (Note: This was a double leg with two Detours and two Roadblocks shown over two episodes. The placements listed for the first half are the order of the teams' arrival at the halfway point in Wyoming.)	10b	11a (Note: This was a double leg with two Detours and two Roadblocks shown over two episodes. The placements listed for the first half are the order of the teams' arrival at the Stade Olympique in Montreal.)	11b
Linz Family	9th	2nd	2nd	3rd	4th	2nd	3rd	2nd	1st> (Note: The Linz Family chose to use the Yield on the Weaver Family.)	3rd	2nd	2nd	1st
Bransen Family	7th	6th	1st	1st	3rd	3rd	5th‡	4th	2nd	1st	1st	1st	2nd
Weaver Family	3rd	1st	5th	5th	2nd	5th< (Note: The Paolo Family chose to use the Yield on the Weaver Family.)	2nd	3rd	4th‡<	2nd	3rd	3rd	3rd
Godlewski Family	1st	3rd	4th	4th	6th‡	4th	1st	1st	3rd	4th	4th†		
Paolo Family	6th	8th	6th	2nd	1stƒ	1st>	4th	5th†					
Gaghan Family	2nd	7th	7th	6th	5th	6th†							
Schroeder Family	5th	4th	3rd	7th†									
Aiello Family	8th	5th	8th†										
Rogers Family	4th	9th†											
Black Family	10th†												

== Race summary ==
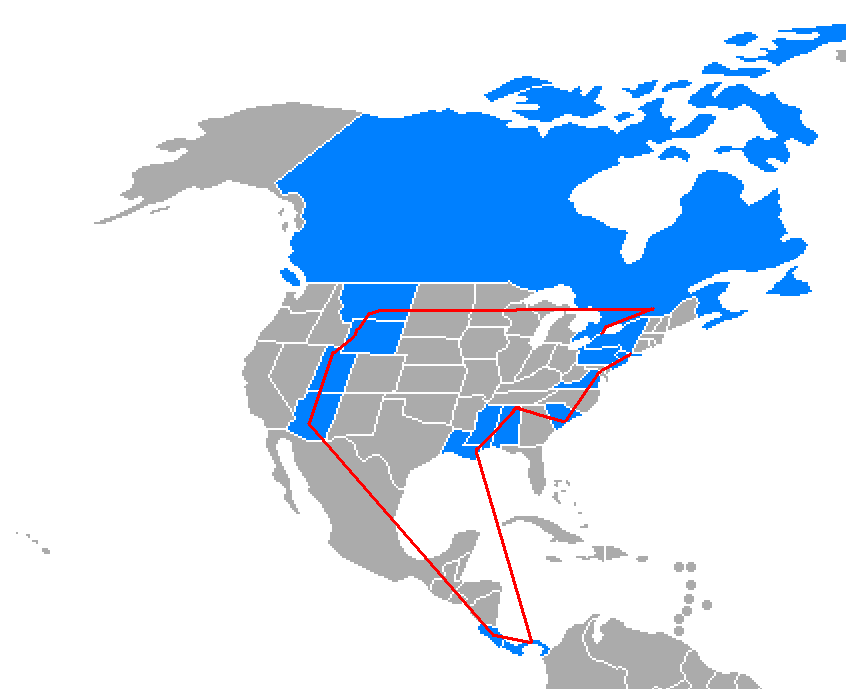
The route of The Amazing Race 8.

Destinations	Air travel Rail travel Water travel Bus travel Helicopter travel Bicycle travel Gondola travel
Route Markers	Detour Roadblock Fast Forward Yield Pit Stop

=== Leg 1 (New York → Pennsylvania & New Jersey) ===
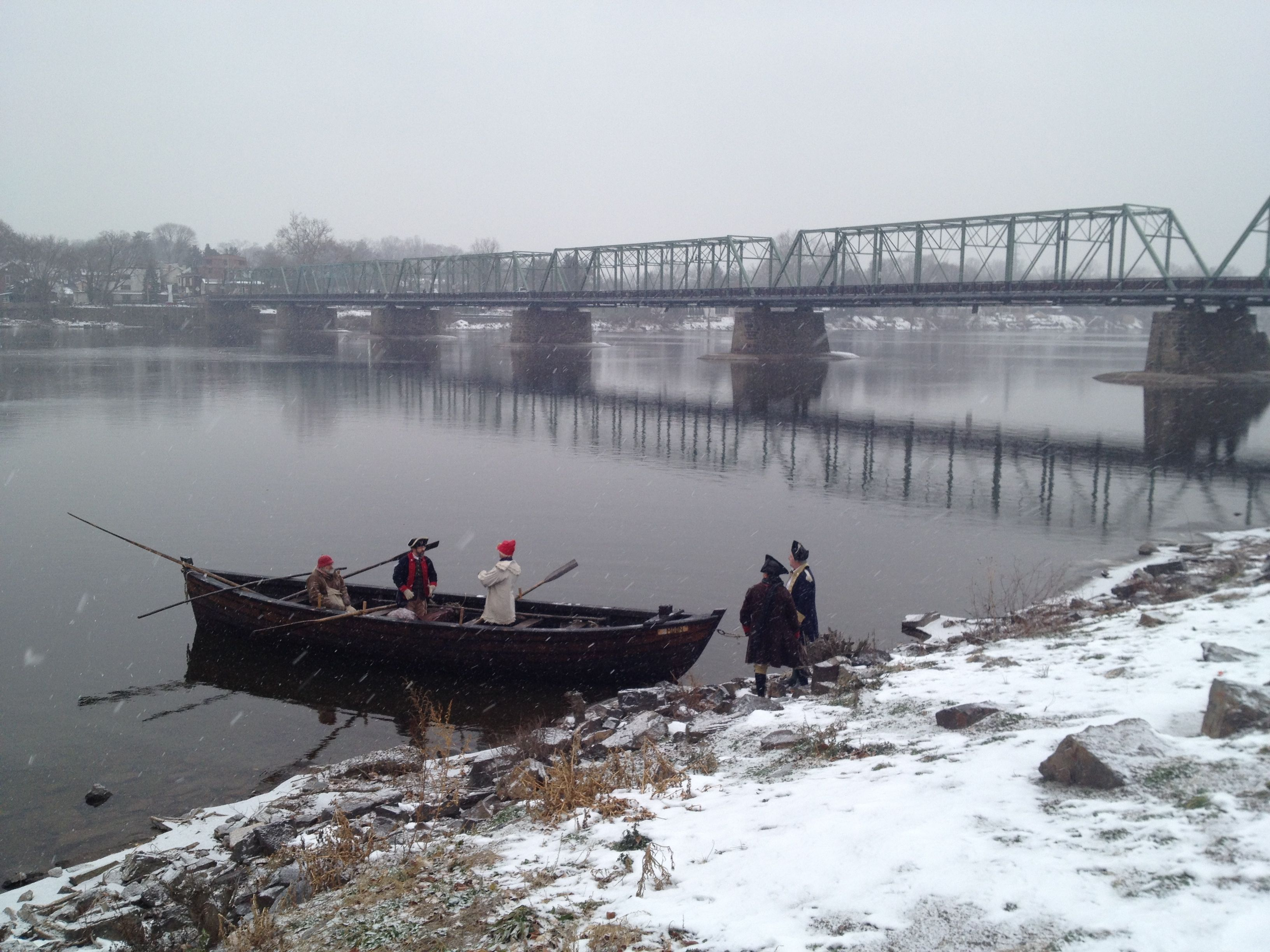
In Pennsylvania, teams had to re-create George Washington's crossing of the Delaware River.

- Episode 1: "Go, Mommy, Go! We Can Beat Them!" (September 27, 2005)
- Prize: US$20,000 cash (awarded to the Godlewski Family)
- Eliminated: Black Family

Locations

- New York City, New York (Empire–Fulton Ferry State Park) (Starting Line)
- New York City (SoHo – Eastern Mountain Sports)
- New York City (East 91st Street – Hot Dog Stand)
- Washington Crossing, Pennsylvania (Washington Crossing Historic Park) & Titusville, New Jersey (Washington Crossing State Park)
- Philadelphia, Pennsylvania (Fairmount Park – Belmont Plateau)
- Mount Joy, Pennsylvania (Brubaker Family Farm)
- Lancaster, Pennsylvania (Rohrer Family Farm)

Episode summary

- Teams set off from Empire–Fulton Ferry State Park and had to drive to Eastern Mountain Sports in SoHo, where they had to pick up camping gear and their next clue. Teams were directed to find a "frank" on East 91st Street between Park and Lexington, where Kevin and Drew from the first season gave them their next clue.
- Teams then drove to Washington Crossing Historic Park in Pennsylvania, where they found their next clue instructing them to recreate George Washington's crossing of the Delaware River by choosing a rowboat to cross the Delaware River to Washington Crossing State Park in New Jersey. Once across, they had to retrieve a 13-star flag, row back to the Pennsylvania shore, and observe a flag-folding ceremony before receiving their next clue.
- After driving to the Belmont Plateau in Fairmount Park, teams had to pitch a tent before receiving a departure time from an Eagle Scout for the next morning, when they had to drive to the Brubaker Family Farm in Mount Joy.
- This season's first Detour was a choice between Build It or Buggy It. In Build It, teams had to use a set of provided materials to construct a functioning scale model of a watermill and then use two buckets of water to power the mill and receive their next clue. In Buggy It, two members from each team had to pull a traditional Amish buggy along a 1.5-mile (2.4 km) course while the other two rode inside to receive their next clue.
- After the Detour, teams had to check in at the Pit Stop: the Rohrer Family Farm in Lancaster, Pennsylvania.

=== Leg 2 (Pennsylvania → Washington, D.C. → Virginia) ===
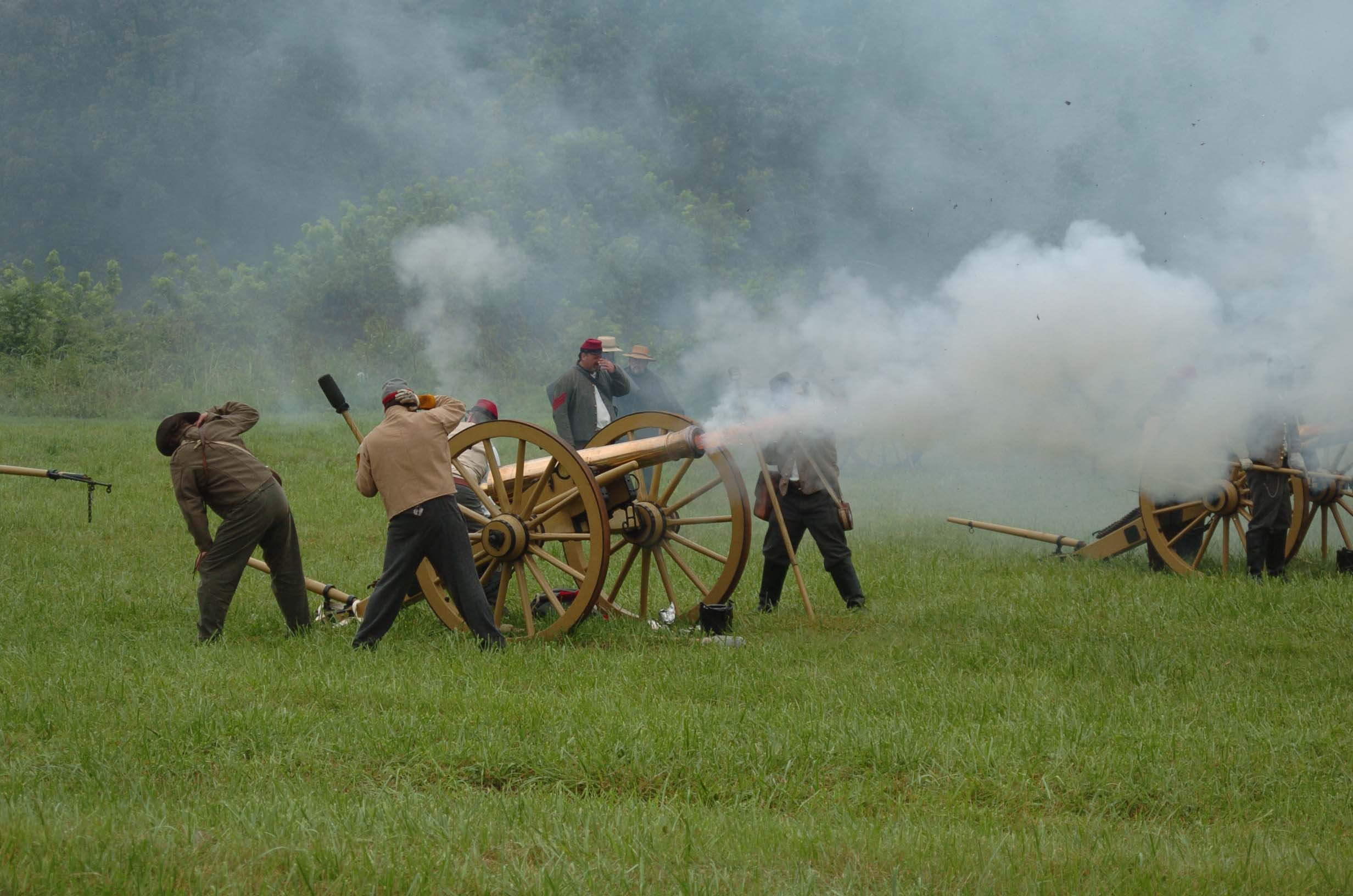
The Detour on this leg featured tasks about the American Civil War.

- Episode 2: "How Do We Know We Aren't Going to Get Shot?" (October 4, 2005)
- Prize: A trip to the Fairmont Southampton in Bermuda (awarded to the Weaver Family)
- Eliminated: Rogers Family

Locations

- Lancaster, Pennsylvania (Rohrer Family Farm)
- York, Pennsylvania (Shoe House Road – Haines Shoe House)
- Washington, D.C. (United States Capitol – Reflecting Pool)
- Washington, D.C. (3rd Street)
- Washington, D.C. (West Potomac Park – Tidal Basin)
- Middleburg, Virginia (Welbourne Manor)

Episode summary

- At the start of this leg, teams were instructed to drive to the Haines Shoe House. There, one team member had to climb to the top of the structure and retrieve their next clue, which directed them to drive to the Capitol Reflecting Pool in Washington, D.C. Teams then had to find a limousine parked on 3rd Street, where they received a briefcase that they had take to the Tidal Basin.
- In this season's first Roadblock, one team member had to search for one of ten spies among 50 people carrying an identical briefcase around the Tidal Basin. To identify the spy, they had to whisper a code phrase ("The sky is blue"), but only a spy would respond with the counterphrase ("The sea is green"). After swapping briefcases, racers found their next clue inside, which directed teams to drive to the Welbourne Manor in Middleburg, Virginia.
- This leg's Detour at an American Civil War reenactment was a choice between Heat of the Battle or Heat of the Night. In Heat of the Battle, teams had to transport five "wounded soldiers" to a surgical tent using stretchers. In Heat of the Night, teams had to roll a barrel of oil to a workstation, fill 20 oil lamps, bring them to the quartermaster, and light them all.
- After the Detour, teams were given a Civil War regimental flag and had to bring to the nearby Pit Stop.

Additional note

- The briefcase swap Roadblock was later revisited on season 22 as a Switchback.

=== Leg 3 (Virginia → South Carolina → Alabama) ===
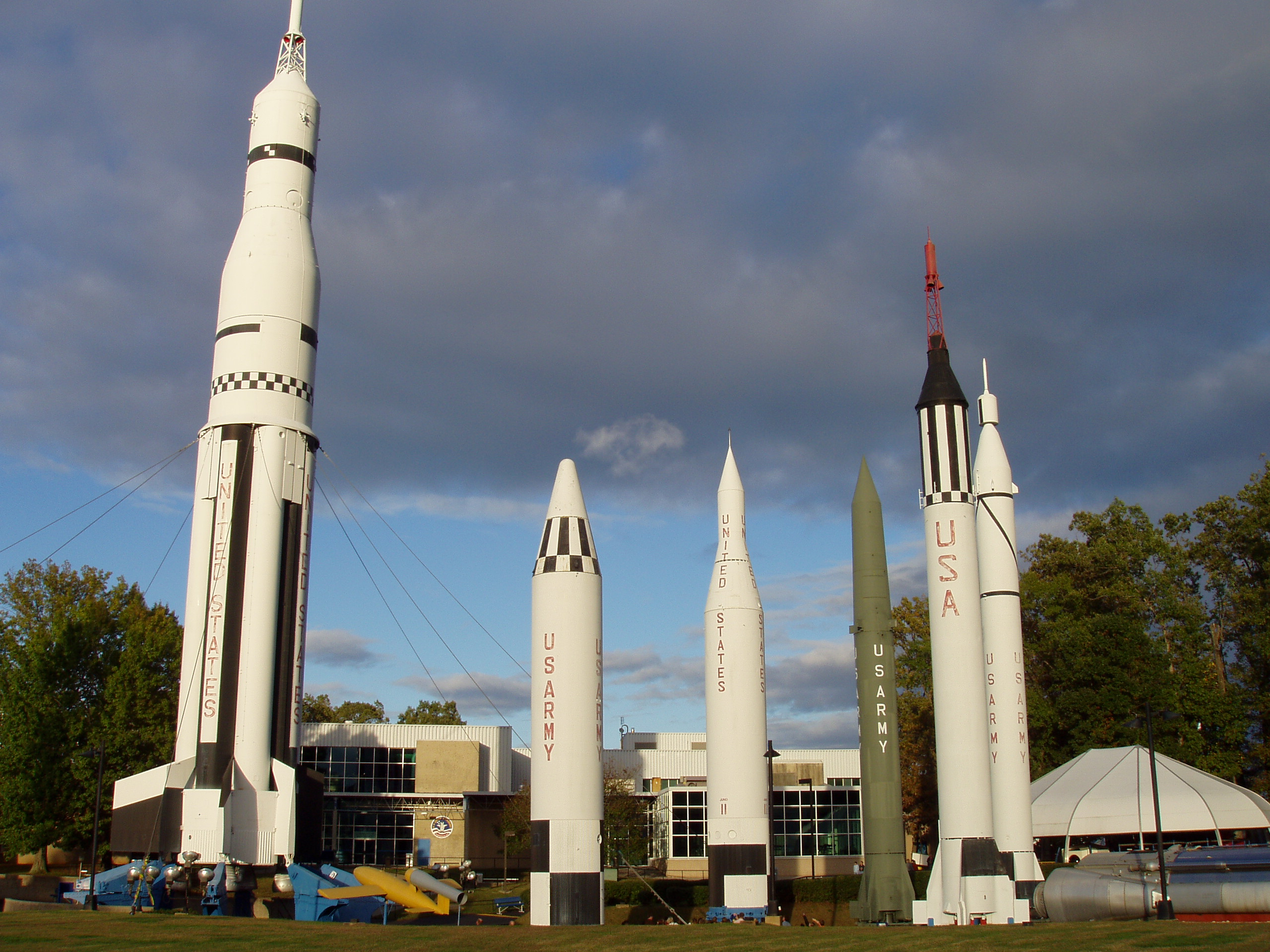
Once in Huntsville, Alabama, teams visited the U.S. Space & Rocket Center.

- Episode 3: "I Don't Kiss I Make Out" (October 11, 2005)
- Prize: Gasoline for life for each team member (awarded to the Bransen Family)
- Eliminated: Aiello Family

Locations

- Middleburg, Virginia (Welbourne Manor)
- Washington, D.C. → Charleston, South Carolina
- Charleston (The Battery)
- Mount Pleasant, South Carolina (Wando Shrimp Co.) or Ridgeville, South Carolina (Ridgeville Mud Run)
- Charleston (Charleston Visitor Center) → Huntsville, Alabama (Huntsville Bus Station)
- Huntsville (U.S. Space & Rocket Center – Edward O. Buckbee Hangar)
- Huntsville (U.S. Space & Rocket Center – Rocket Park)
- Huntsville (U.S. Space & Rocket Center – Space Shuttle Pathfinder)

Episode summary

- At the start of this leg, teams were instructed to fly to Charleston, South Carolina. Once there, teams had to drive to The Battery and find their next clue at a gazebo.
- This leg's Detour was a choice between Forrest Gump or Muddy Waters. In Forrest Gump, teams had to drive 7 miles (11 km) to the Wando Shrimp Company in Mount Pleasant, board a shrimp boat, and de-head 200 pounds (91 kg) of shrimp by hand to receive their next clue. In Muddy Waters, teams had to drive 37 miles (60 km) to Ridgeville, find the Ridgeville Mud Run, and drive an SUV one lap through a 400-foot (120 m) gully filled with mud to receive their next clue. If teams got stuck, they had to wait to be towed out before beginning the course again.
- After the Detour, teams had find the Charleston Visitor Center and sign-up for one of two charter buses to a mystery destination (Huntsville, Alabama). At the city's bus station, teams found their next clue and were instructed to drive to the Edward O. Buckbee Hangar at the U.S. Space & Rocket Center, which had their next clue.
- In this leg's Roadblock, two team members had to ride in a centrifuge and endure a gravitational pull of 3.2g to receive their next clue.
- After the Roadblock, teams had to walk almost one mile (1.6 km) to the nearby Rocket Park and log into a computer to receive a video clue from Phil, who instructed them to travel on foot to the Pit Stop: the Space Shuttle Pathfinder.

Additional note

- Astronaut Robert C. Springer appeared as the Pit Stop greeter during this leg.

=== Leg 4 (Alabama → Mississippi → Louisiana) ===
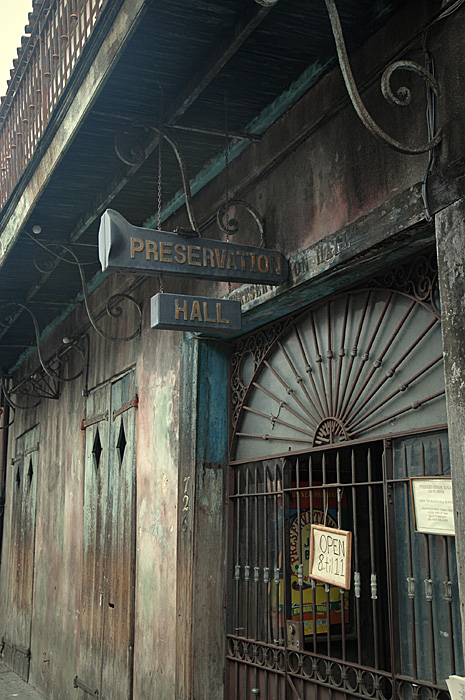
Teams ended this leg at the historic Preservation Hall in the French Quarter of New Orleans.

- Episode 4: "Think Like an Office Chair" (October 18, 2005)
- Prize: A Universal Orlando Resort package at Orlando, Florida (awarded to the Bransen Family)
- Eliminated: Schroeder Family

Locations

- Huntsville, Alabama (U.S. Space & Rocket Center – Space Shuttle Pathfinder)
- Anniston, Alabama (World's Largest Office Chair)
- Talladega, Alabama (International Motorsports Hall of Fame)
- Talladega (Talladega Superspeedway)
- Hattiesburg, Mississippi (Southern Colonel Mobile Homes)
- Richland, Mississippi (BP Gas Station)
- Madisonville, Louisiana (Fairview-Riverside State Park)
- New Orleans, Louisiana (Preservation Hall)

Episode summary

- At the start of this leg, teams were instructed to drive to Anniston, Alabama, where one team member had to climb to the top of the World's Largest Office Chair and retrieve their next clue. Teams then had to drive to the International Motorsports Hall of Fame in Talladega and search the museum for their next clue. Teams had to choose a party bike and complete one 2.6-mile (4.2 km) lap around the Talladega Superspeedway track to receive their next clue.
- Teams had to find the "Southern Colonel" in Hattiesburg, Mississippi, which they had to figure out was a mobile home dealership. When they arrived, teams had to search through 37 mobile homes for one of three departure times the next morning. They then spent the night in the mobile home and found their next clue on the windshield of their car the next morning.
- The next day, teams had to find their next clue at gas station in Richland. Teams were then told to drive to the "Pelican State" – Louisiana – and find their next clue at Fairview-Riverside State Park in Madisonville.
- This leg's Detour was a choice between Work or Play. In Work, teams had to don flannel clothing and then cut four slices 12 inches (30 cm) in diameter off a log using a two-man saw to receive their next clue. In Play, teams had to don traditional New Orleans clothing and travel by canoe to a riverboat, where they had to win three rounds of blackjack against a professional dealer to receive their next clue.
- After the Detour, teams had to drive to New Orleans and check in at the Pit Stop: Preservation Hall in the French Quarter.

=== Leg 5 (Louisiana → Panama) ===
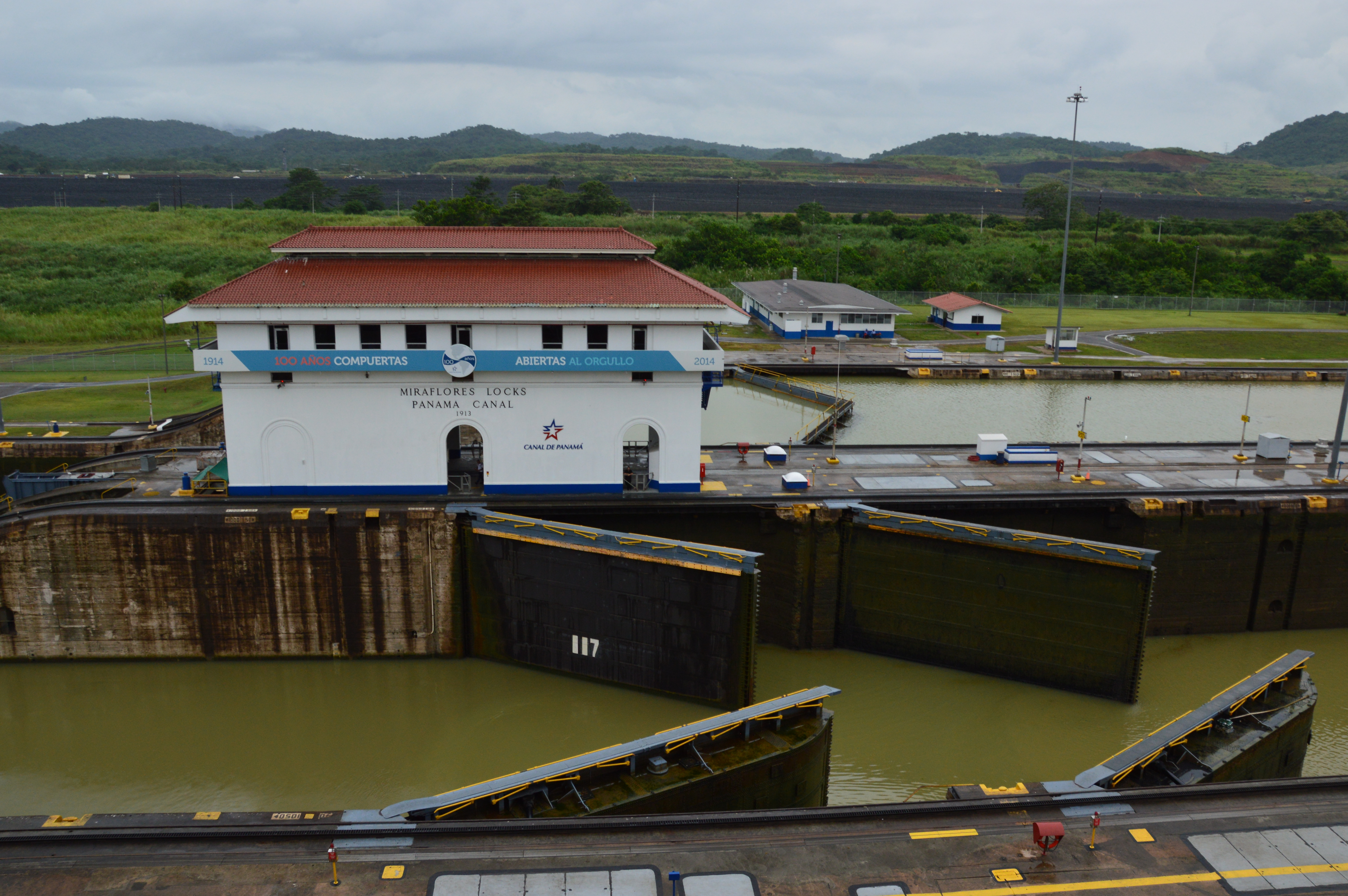
The Pit Stop for this leg was located at the Miraflores Locks of the Panama Canal.

- Episode 5: "We're Getting Out of the Country, Girls" (October 25, 2005)
- Prize: A Gamboa Rainforest Resort package at the Panama Canal (awarded to the Paolo Family)

Locations

- New Orleans, Louisiana (Preservation Hall)
- New Orleans → Panama City, Panama
- Gamboa (Smithsonian Tropical Research Institute Gamboa Field Station) & Barro Colorado Island (Smithsonian Tropical Research Institute)
- Panama City (Panama Canal – Pier 14)
- Panama City (Casco Viejo or El Parque Metropolitan)
- Panama City (Estadio Juan Demóstenes Arosemena)
- Panama City (Panama Canal – Miraflores Locks)

Episode summary

- At the start of this leg, teams were instructed to fly to Panama City, Panama. Once there, teams had to travel to the Smithsonian Tropical Research Institute in Gamboa, board a boat to Barro Colorado Island, and search for a scientist, who had their next clue. Afterward, teams had to return to Gamboa by boat and find a red devil bus, known locally as a diablo rojo, which served as their means of transportation for the rest of this leg.
- For this season's only Fast Forward, one team had to find a crane at the Pacific side of the Panama Canal in Balboa. There, the family had to split into pairs and each perform a tandem bungee jump. The Paolo Family won the Fast Forward.
- This leg's Detour was a choice between Rhythm or Coos. In Rhythm, teams had to travel to Casco Viejo and collect four musical instruments from four locations: a saxophone, a trumpet, a conga drum, and a trombone. They then had to deliver them to Take Five Jazz and Wine, where they received their next clue. In Coos, teams traveled to El Parque Metropolitan, where they had to use binoculars to search the rainforest canopy for wooden replicas of five local bird species shown on a provided bird identification chart and circle the correct species on the chart to receive their next clue.
- After the Detour, teams had to travel to the Estadio Juan Demóstenes Arosemena and find their next clue.
- In this leg's Roadblock, one team member had to play baseball against a local little-league champion. If they got a base hit or home run, the umpire gave them their next clue, but if a player failed after three pitches, they had to go to the end of the line before trying again.
- After the Roadblock, teams had to check in at the Pit Stop: the Miraflores Locks of the Panama Canal.

Additional note

- This was a non-elimination leg.

=== Leg 6 (Panama → Costa Rica) ===
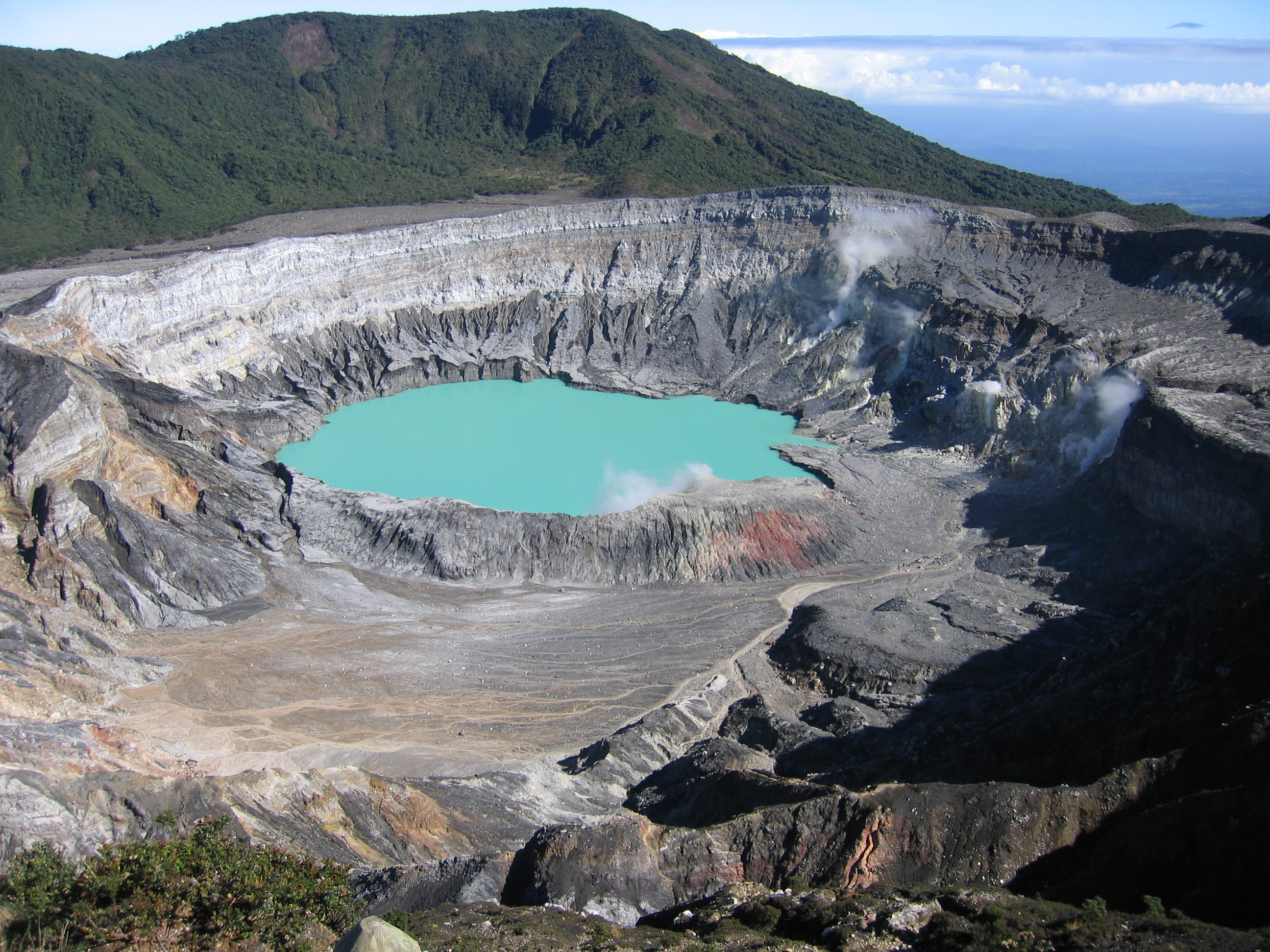
Teams visited Poás Volcano National Park in Costa Rica in this leg.

- Episode 6: "I'm Sick of Doing Stuff I Can't Do" (November 1, 2005)
- Prize: A choice of a Segway HT, Vespa, jet ski, or all-terrain vehicle for each team member (awarded to the Paolo Family)
- Eliminated: Gaghan Family

Locations

- Panama City (Panama Canal – Miraflores Locks)
- Panama City (Terminal Nacional de Transporte) → San José, Costa Rica
- San José (Parqueo Publico Adrian)
- Poás Volcano National Park (Poás Volcano)
- Alajuela (Doka Estate)
- Jacó (Roca Loca Surf Shop)
- Manuel Antonio National Park (Rainmaker Park) or Parrita (Frutas Selectas del Tropico)
- Quepos (Malecon)

Episode summary

- At the start of this leg, teams were instructed to go to the Terminal Nacional de Transporte, where they had to pull a departure time for one of two charter buses leaving thirty minutes apart to San José, Costa Rica. Once there, teams had to travel to the Parqueo Publico Adrian, where they found their next clue directing them to Poás Volcano National Park. Teams then had to drive to the Doka Estate in Alajuela, which had their next clue.
- In this leg's Roadblock, one team member had to search through an 800-pound (360 kg) pile of coffee beans for the one red bean, which they could exchange for their next clue.
- After the Roadblock, teams had to drive to the Roca Loca Surf Shop in Jacó and find a man named Javier, who had their next clue.
- This leg's Detour was a choice between Relic or Ripe. In Relic, teams traveled to Rainmaker Park, where they had to search for four Mayan relics and deliver them to an archaeologist in exchange for their next clue. In Ripe, teams traveled to the Frutas Selectas del Tropico banana plantation, where they had to gather fifteen bushels of bananas and load them onto hanging tracks. Teams then had to use a local pulley-system to haul the bananas to the distribution center to receive their next clue.
- After the Detour, teams had to check in at the Pit Stop: the Malecon in Quepos.

Additional note

- The Paolo Family chose to Yield the Weaver Family.

=== Leg 7 (Costa Rica → Arizona) ===
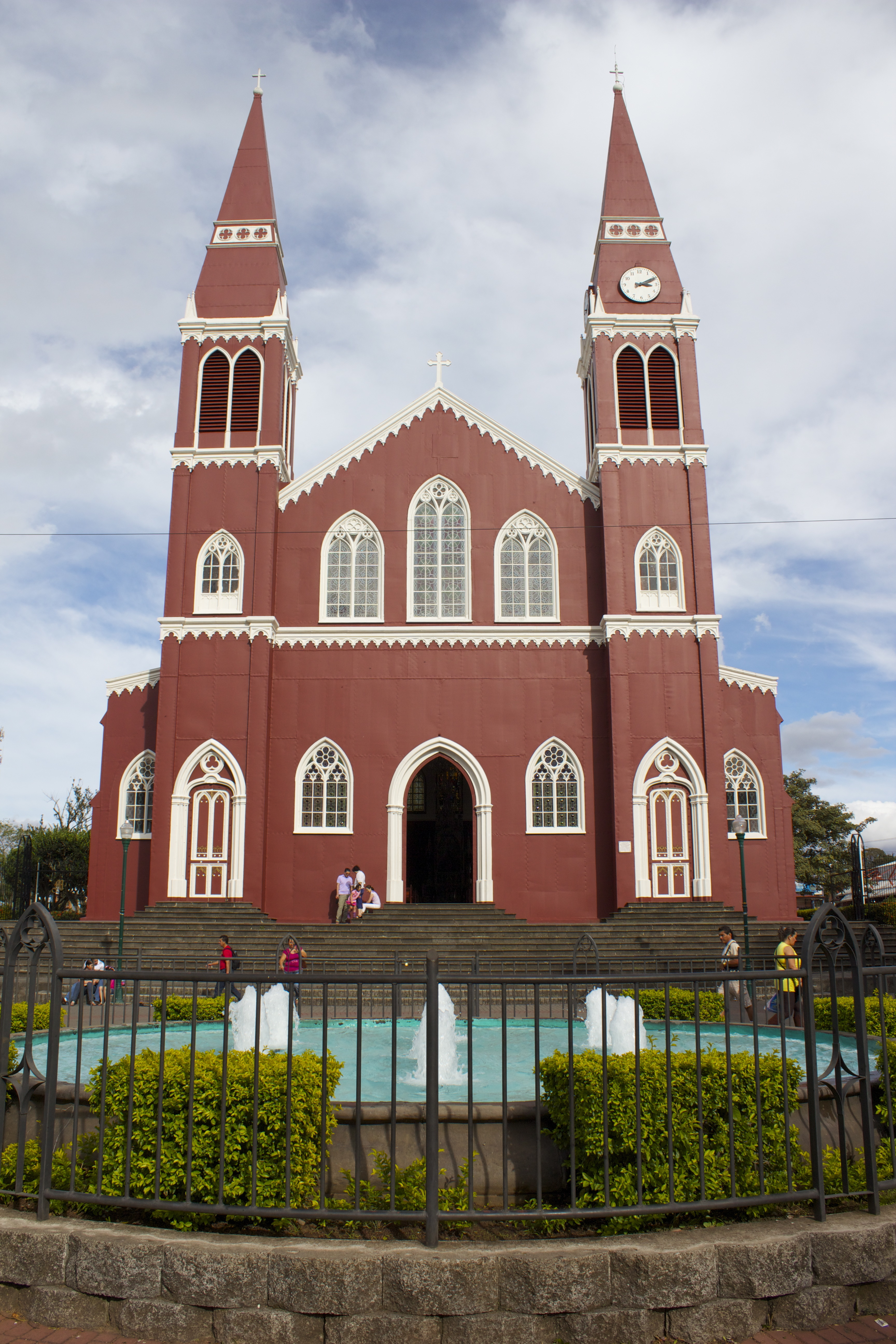
At the Iglesia de Metal in Grecia, Costa Rica, teams found their Detour clue.

- Episode 7: "You Look Ridiculous" (November 8, 2005)
- Prize: A trip to Belize (awarded to the Godlewski Family)

Locations

- Quepos (Malecon)
- Quepos (Playa Maracas)
- Grecia (Iglesia de Metal)
- Sarchí (Taller Eloy Alfaro) or Grecia (Ingenio La Argentina & Fabrica Nacional de Licores)
- San José → Phoenix, Arizona
- Chandler, Arizona (Bondurant SuperKart School)
- Fort McDowell, Arizona (Fort McDowell Adventures)

Episode summary

- At the start of this leg, teams traveled on foot to Playa Maracas, where one team member had to swim to a buoy and get their next clue directing them to the Iglesia de Metal in Grecia.
- This leg's Detour was a choice between Brush or Barrel. In Brush, teams had to travel to Taller Eloy Alfaro in Sarchí. Once there, they had to choose two partially painted cartwheels and paint the missing sections to receive their clue. In Barrel, teams traveled to a sugarcane factory, where they had to load a tractor with one tonne (0.98 long tons; 1.1 short tons) of harvested sugarcane and then transport it six miles (9.7 km) to a rum factory. Once the sugarcane was delivered, they had to search a warehouse to find a marked barrel-rack hidden among dozens of rum barrels with their next clue.
- After the Detour, teams were instructed to fly to Phoenix, Arizona. Once there, teams had to drive to the Bondurant SuperKart School in Chandler and find their next clue.
- In this leg's Roadblock, one team member had to drive a racing go-kart for 50 laps around the race track to receive their next clue directing them to the Pit Stop: Fort McDowell Adventures in Fort McDowell.

Additional note

- This was a non-elimination leg.

=== Leg 8 (Arizona) ===
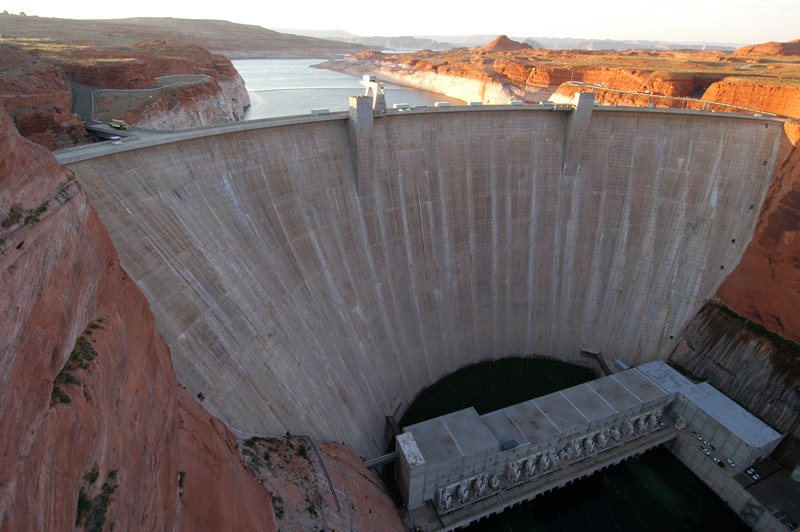
In Page, Arizona, teams visited Glen Canyon Dam.

- Episode 8: "I Don't Roll with the Punches, I Punch" (November 8, 2005)
- Prize: A Jay-Flight 27 B.H. Travel Trailer (awarded to the Godlewski Family)
- Eliminated: Paolo Family

Locations

- Fort McDowell, Arizona (Fort McDowell Adventures)
- Mesa, Arizona (Phoenix–Mesa Gateway Airport – Fighter Combat International)
- Grand Canyon National Park (Grand Canyon – Lipan Point)
- Page, Arizona (Glen Canyon Dam)
- Glen Canyon National Recreation Area (Horseshoe Bend)
- Page (Antelope Point) → Lake Powell (Houseboat)

Episode summary

- At the start of this leg, teams were instructed to drive to Fighter Combat International in Mesa, Arizona.
- In this leg's Roadblock, one team member had to fly in a fighter plane and, following the pilot's direction, perform a 360-degree loop to receive their next clue.
- After the Roadblock, teams had to drive to the Grand Canyon and find their next clue at Lipan Point. Teams then had to drive to the Glen Canyon Dam and choose a guide, who took them to their next clue atop the dam.
- This leg's Detour was a choice between Bearing or Bailing. For both Detours options, teams traveled by motorized raft to Horseshoe Bend along the Colorado River. In Bearing, teams had to choose one of five color-coded cards with unique compass bearings. They then followed the bearing to the next card and repeated the process until they obtained four cards that they could exchange them for the next clue. In Bailing, teams had to use the provided tools to bail water out of a submerged boat until it was light enough to carry ashore, after which, teams received their next clue.
- After the Detour, teams were directed to Antelope Point, where they headed down a path to Lake Powell and raced on motorboats to the Pit Stop: a marked houseboat.

Additional note

- Legs 7 and 8 aired back-to-back as a special two-hour episode.

=== Leg 9 (Arizona → Utah) ===
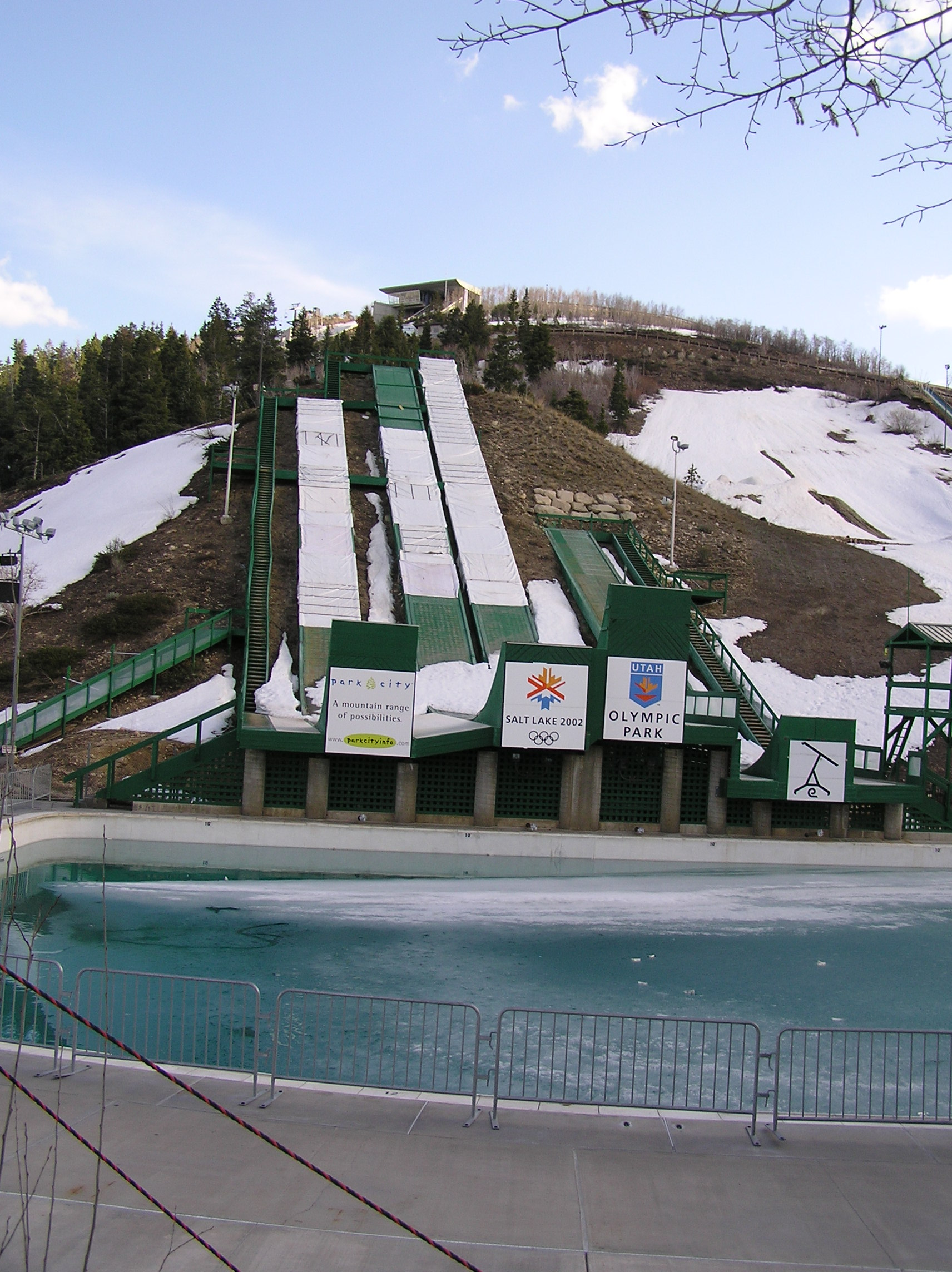
While in Utah, teams encountered a Roadblock involving a pool ski jump at the Utah Olympic Park.

- Episode 9: "How's That Face Feel?" (November 22, 2005)
- Prize: A trip for four to the Teton Mountain Lodge in Jackson Hole, Wyoming (awarded to the Linz Family)

Locations

- Lake Powell, Arizona (Houseboat)
- Monument Valley (John Ford's Point & Elephant Butte)
- Moab, Utah (Gemini Bridges – Bull Canyon)
- Green River, Utah (Green River State Park)
- Heber City, Utah (970 Little Sweden Road)
- Park City, Utah (Utah Olympic Park)
- Salt Lake City, Utah (Salt Lake City Public Library)

Episode summary

- At the start of this leg, teams were instructed to drive to Monument Valley. At John Ford's Point, two team members from each family had to ride in a helicopter to Elephant Butte, where they retrieved the next clue from the summit. Teams then had to drive to Moab, Utah.
- This leg's Detour was a choice between Ride Down or Drop Down. In Ride Down, teams had to ride bicycles along a six-mile (9.7 km) course down the mountain and then to Bull Canyon in order to retrieve their next clue. In Drop Down, teams had to complete a two-stage rappel, totaling 270 feet (82 m), to reach Bull Canyon and their next clue.
- After the Detour, teams drove to Green River State Park in Green River for an overnight rest. Teams' departure times were determined by the order of their arrival. The next day, teams had to drive to Heber City and find Bart the Bear, who had the next clue in his mouth. Teams were then directed to the Utah Olympic Park in Park City.
- In this leg's Roadblock, one team member had to put on skis and descend a 60-foot (18 m) ski-jump training ramp into an Olympic pool to receive their next clue directing them to the Pit Stop: the rooftop of the Salt Lake City Public Library in Salt Lake City.

Additional notes

- The Linz Family chose to Yield the Weaver Family.
- This was a non-elimination leg.

=== Leg 10 (Utah → Wyoming → Montana) ===
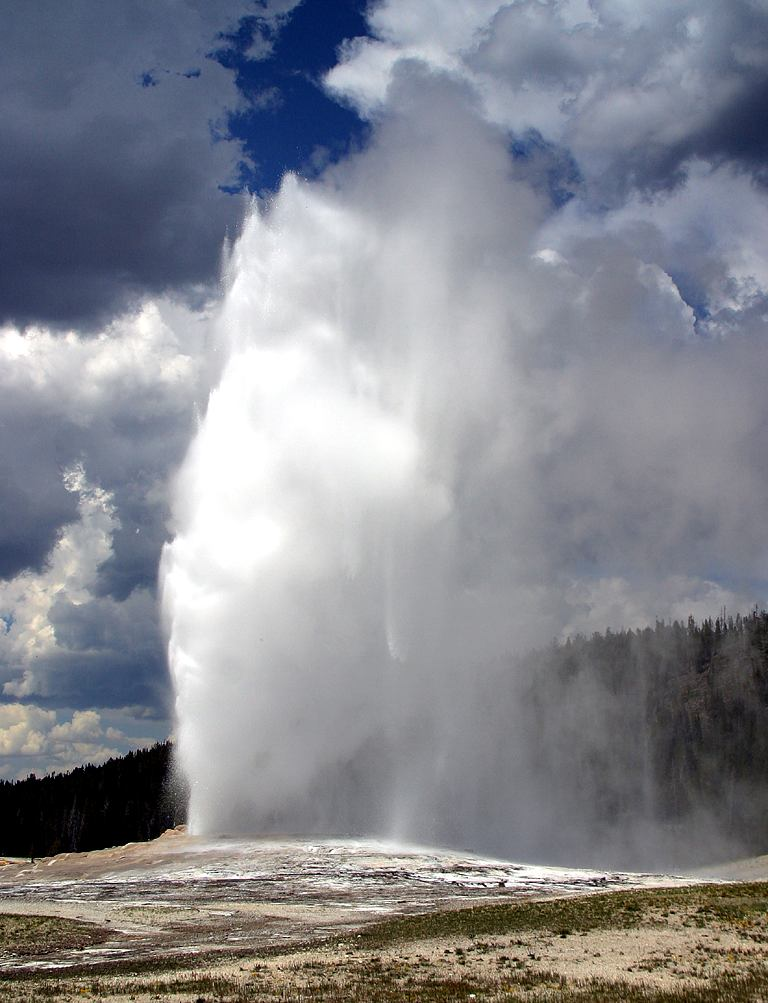
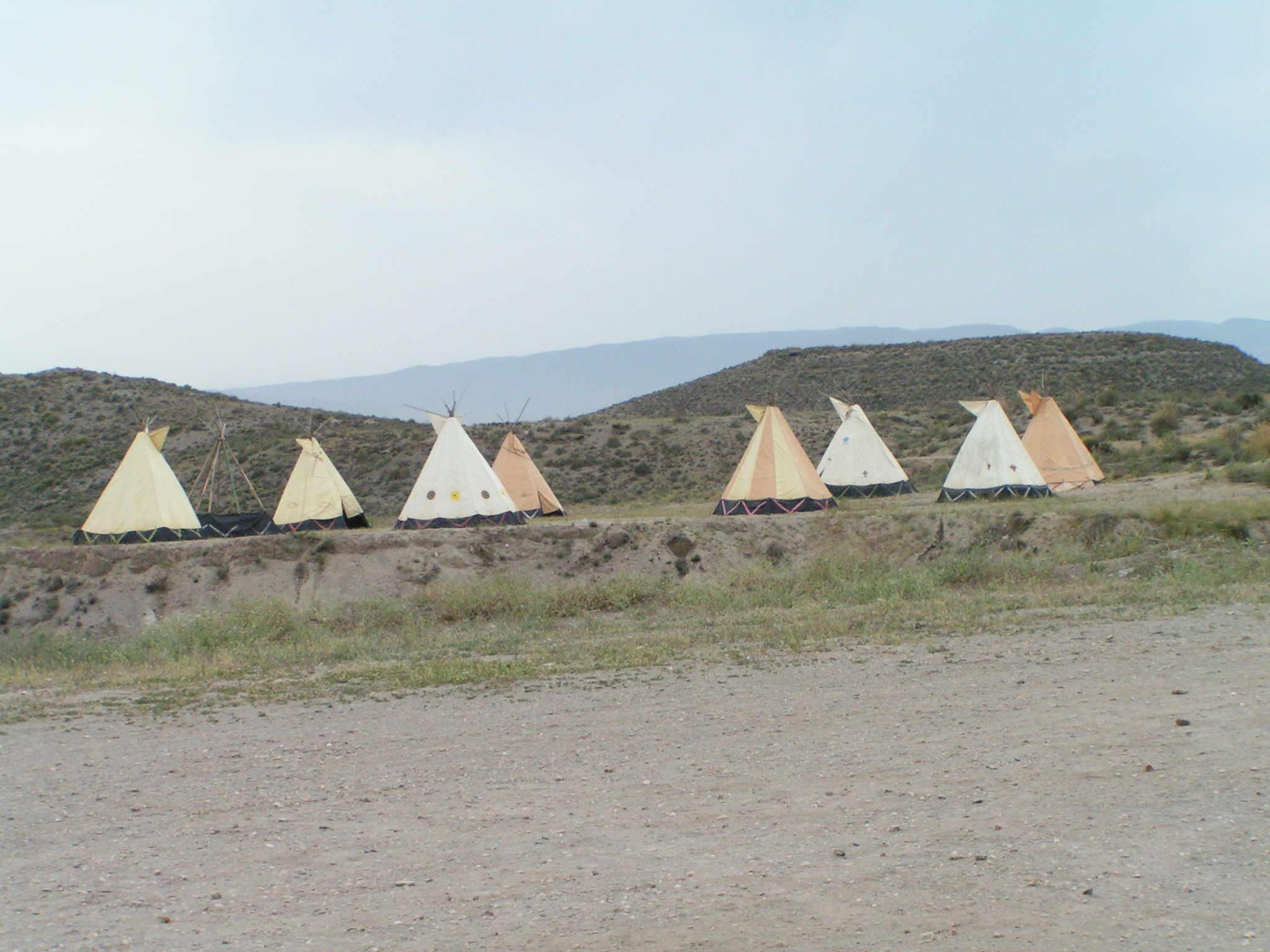
At Yellowstone National Park, teams had to wait for the eruption of Old Faithful (above) before receiving their next clue, and one side of the Detour involved teams building a teepee (below).
- Episode 10: "Don't Talk to Me Like I Was an Animal or Something" (November 29, 2005) & Episode 11: "The Family Christmas Card" (December 6, 2005)
- Prize: A 2006 full-size Buick Lucerne luxury sedan (awarded to the Bransen Family)
- Eliminated: Godlewski Family

Locations

- Salt Lake City, Utah (Salt Lake City Public Library)
- Park City, Utah (Park City High School)
- Heber City, Utah (Heber Valley Railway)
- Bonneville Salt Flats (Tree of Utah)
- Garden City, Utah (Bear Lake Rendezvous Beach)
- Big Piney, Wyoming (Dunham Ranch)
- Yellowstone National Park (Old Faithful)
- Moran, Wyoming (Pinto Ranch)
- Dubois, Wyoming (Turtle Ranch)
- Cody, Wyoming (Irma Hotel)
- Red Lodge, Montana (Red Lodge Mountain Golf Course)
- Absarokee, Montana (Larry Arnold's Green Meadow Ranch)

Episode summary (Episode 10)

- At the start of this leg, teams were instructed to drive to Park City High School in Park City, Utah. There, teams helped to inflate a hot air balloon and then flew across the Utah countryside. After landing, teams received their next clue directing them to the Heber Valley Railway.
- This leg's first Detour was a choice between Spike It or Steam It. In Spike It, teams used historic materials and tools to complete a 20-foot (6.1 m) section of railway track before receiving their next clue. In Steam It, teams used buckets to fill the tender of a steam locomotive with nearly 400 pounds (180 kg) of coal to receive their next clue.
- After the first Detour, teams had to drive to the Tree of Utah sculpture at the Bonneville Salt Flats and search for their next clue. Teams then drove to Bear Lake Rendezvous Beach in Garden City, where they had to spend the night. Teams' departure times were determined by the order of their arrival. The next morning, teams had to drive to the Dunham Ranch in Big Piney, Wyoming, where they found their next clue.
- In this leg's first Roadblock, two team members had to mount horses and herd six cattle 1/4 mile (0.40 km) from a holding pen into a corral to receive their next clue.
- After the first Roadblock, the teams' clue stated "I'm old, I'm faithful". Teams had to figure out that their next location was Old Faithful at Yellowstone National Park. Teams had to wait for the geyser to erupt before receiving their next clue, which instructed teams to drive to the Pinto Ranch in Moran. There, teams met Phil, who told them that the leg was not over before handing them their next clue.

Episode summary (Episode 11)

- Teams were instructed to drive to the Turtle Ranch in Dubois.
- This leg's second Detour was a choice between Pioneer Spirit or Native Tradition. In Pioneer Spirit, teams had to attach four wheels to a covered wagon, hook up a team of horses, and drive along a one-quarter-mile (0.40 km) course to receive their next clue. In Native Tradition, teams had to use traditional materials and tools to build a teepee to receive their next clue.
- After the second Detour, teams were given the clue "Do you know the hotel named after Buffalo Bill's daughter?" Teams had to figure out that they needed to go to the Irma Hotel in Cody, where they had to don period clothing and take a picture with a Buffalo Bill impersonator. Once the photo was developed, teams received their next clue, which directed them to drive to Red Lodge, Montana. At the Red Lodge Mountain Golf Course, teams had to find the "Tenth Tee" to retrieve their next clue.
- In this leg's second Roadblock, two team members had to choose a colored flag and attach it to a golf cart. They then had to search the golf course for balls the same color as their flag, which they could exchange for their next clue directing them to the Pit Stop: Larry Arnold's Green Meadow Ranch in Absarokee, Montana.

Additional note

- Leg 10 was a double leg that aired over two episodes.

=== Leg 11 (Montana → Canada → New York) ===
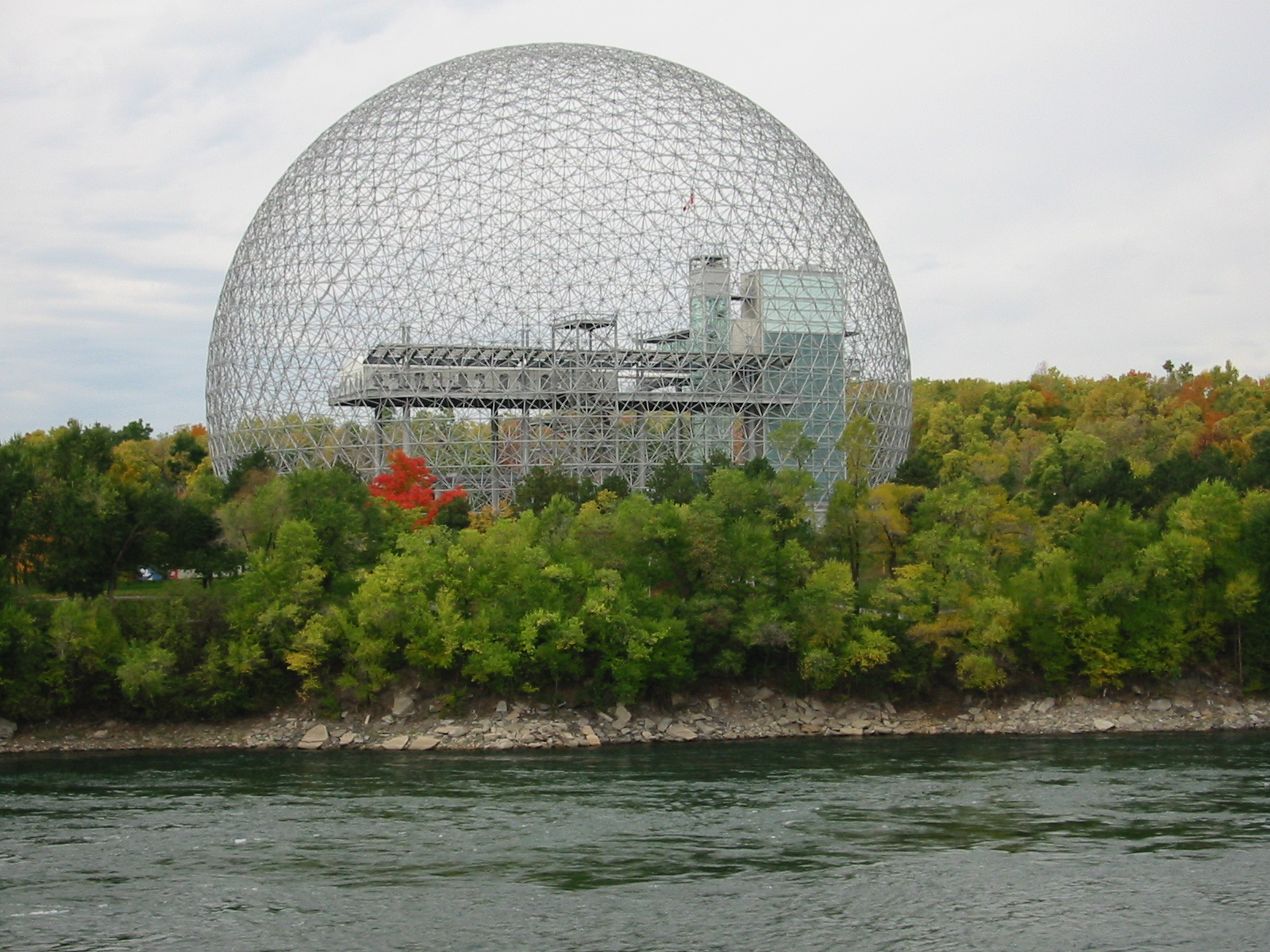

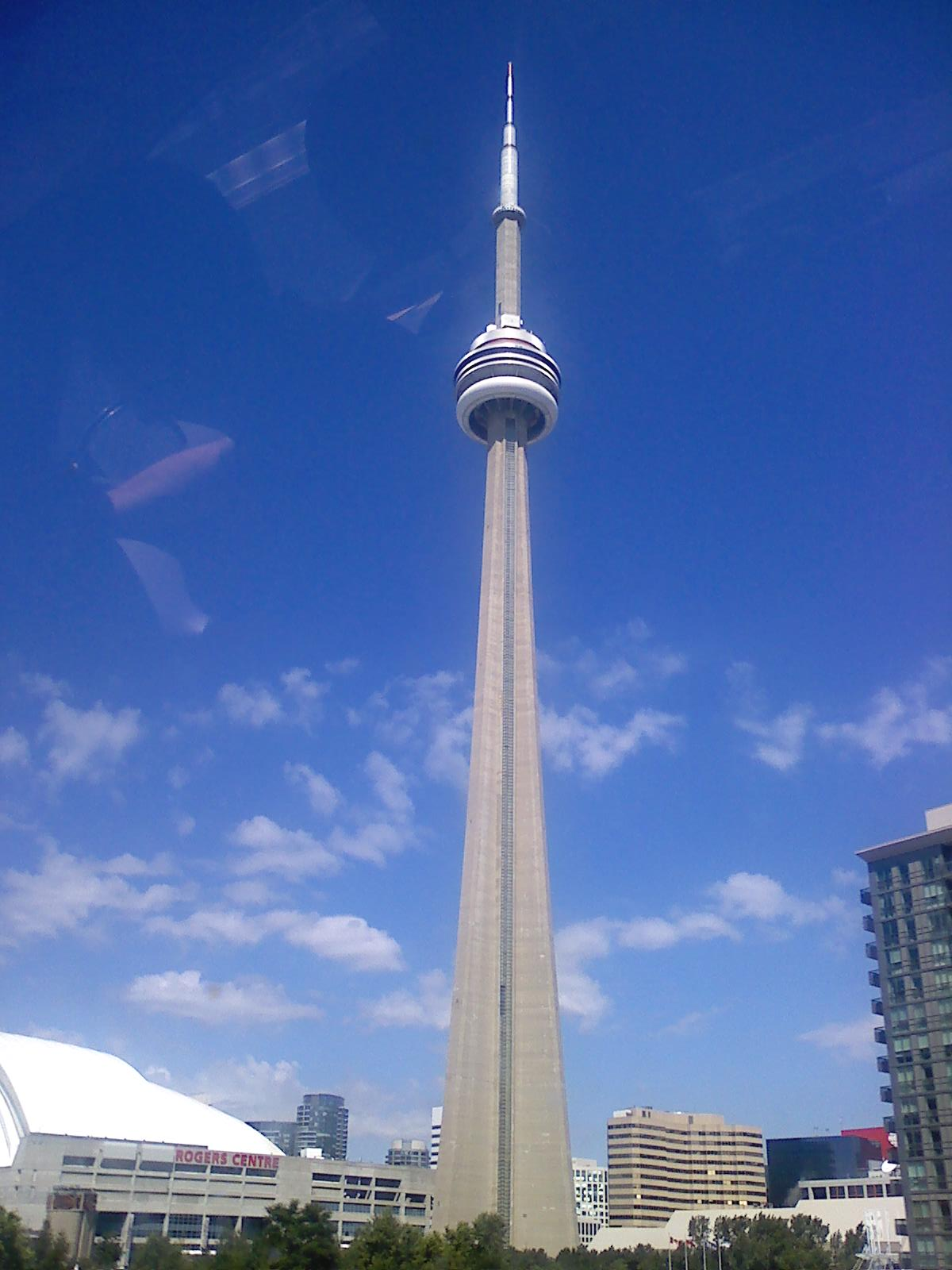
Teams spent this double-length leg in Canada, where they visited the Montreal Biosphere (above), and continued on to the CN Tower in Toronto (below).

- Episode 12: "25 Days, 50 Cities, and More Than 600 Consecutive Hours Together as a Family" (December 13, 2005)
- Prize: US$1,000,000
- Winners: Linz Family
- Second Place: Bransen Family
- Third Place: Weaver Family

Locations

- Absarokee, Montana (Larry Arnold's Green Meadow Ranch)
- Billings, Montana → Montreal, Canada
- Montreal (Victoria Square – Square-Victoria Metro Station)
- Montreal (Underground City – Centre CDP Capital Building Passageway)
- Sainte-Anne-de-Bellevue (McGill University – Glenfinnan Rink or Morgan Arboretum)
- Montreal (Saint Helen's Island – Montreal Biosphere)
- Montreal (Trapezium)
- Montreal (Parc Olympique – Stade Olympique)
- Montreal (Montreal Saint-Hubert Longueuil Airport) → Toronto (Toronto City Centre Airport)
- Toronto (CN Tower)
- Toronto (Polson Pier)
- Toronto (Queens Quay Sailing and Powerboating & Harbourfront Centre – Kajama or Bata Shoe Museum)
- Queenston (Queenston Boat Ramp – Whirlpool Jet Boat Tours) → Niagara River (Niagara Gorge)
- Lewiston, New York (Joseph Davis State Park)

Episode summary

- At the start of this leg, teams were instructed to fly to Montreal, Canada. Once there, teams had to travel to the Square-Victoria Metro Station, enter the Underground City, and search the passageways for the basement of the Centre CDP building, which had their next clue.
- This leg's first Detour was a choice between Slide It or Roll It. In Slide It, teams traveled to Glenfinnan Rink at McGill University and participated in the sport of curling. Each team member had to slid a granite stone 120 feet (37 m) down the ice into target to receive their next clue. In Roll It, teams traveled to Morgan Arboretum and had to use lumberjack tools to roll four wooden logs along the 100-foot (30 m) course to receive their next clue.
- After the first Detour, teams had to find the American Pavilion of Expo 67, which they had to figure out was the Montreal Biosphere. Once there, teams had to climb to the 5th floor to find their next clue, which directed them to Trapezium.
- In this leg's first Roadblock, one team member had to successfully complete a flying trapeze maneuver known as a "catch" to receive their clue.
- After the first Roadblock, teams had to travel to the Parc Olympique, drive a golf cart to the Stade Olympique, and then find the one door wide enough to drive through. Once inside the stadium, teams had to search among the 56,000 stadium seats for tickets on one of three charter flights departing the next morning to a mystery destination (Toronto). After teams found their departure times, they spent the night in the stadium.
- Once in Toronto, teams found their next clue on a marked car at the airport and had to drive to the CN Tower. Once there, teams took an elevator to the observation deck and used binoculars to locate their next clue at Polson Pier.
- This season's final Detour was a choice between Ship or Shoe. In Ship, teams had to sail across Toronto Harbour from Queens Quay to the schooner Kajama, where one team member had to climb 100 feet (30 m) to the top of the mast and retrieve a nautical flag that they could exchange for their next clue. In Shoe, teams traveled to Bata Shoe Museum, where they had to choose a pair of shoes and search among 100 women for the one woman who fit the shoes to receive their next clue.
- After the second Detour, teams had to Whirlpool Jet Boat Tours on the Canadian side of Niagara Gorge and ride a jet boat up the Niagara Gorge to a buoy with their next clue. Teams then had to travel by boat to Joseph Davis State Park in Lewiston, New York, to find their next clue.
- In this season's final Roadblock, one team member had to assemble a giant 71-piece jigsaw puzzle map of North America and Central America. Once the puzzle was complete, teams could proceed to the nearby finish line.

Additional notes

- Teams were provided tickets for a flight from Billings, Montana, to Montreal via Minneapolis, Minnesota, and Toronto, but they were under no obligation to use them.
- Leg 11 was a double leg that aired as a special two-hour episode.
- After the season ended, CBS hosted the "Final Amazing Challenge" on the official website where the Bransen and Weaver families competed for a GMC Yukon XL. Using the completed map from the final Roadblock, teams ran out to clue boxes to retrieve cutouts, each representing tasks they performed on the race, and placed them on the associated part of the map. This challenge was won by the Bransen Family.

== Reception ==
Feedback from fans, critics, and racers was negative over the format changes implemented in this edition of The Amazing Race, including the lack of international travel, watered-down challenges tailored to families, and the expanded cast which also made it more difficult to develop individual story lines. Dalton Ross of Entertainment Weekly commented that "Half the fun of The Amazing Race has always been watching the inter- and intra-couple bickering that goes with being chronically late and lost in a foreign land. Seeing parents yell at their children in exotic New Jersey? Not so fun". Robert Bianco of USA Today shared similar opinions, adding that "the idea of being trapped in the back seat for a forced cross-country family drive comes closer to a nightmare relived than a dream come true." Linda Holmes of Television Without Pity called the decision to have 40 contestants "baffling" and was disappointed with the tasks and locations on this season. Scott Pierce of Deseret News wrote "this 'Family Edition' of 'Amazing Race' is by far my least favorite. None of the families really seemed worth rooting for and the competition has been watered down to something less than scintillating to accommodate the family element."

In 2016, this season was ranked last out of the first 27 seasons by the Rob Has a Podcast Amazing Race correspondents. In 2024, Rhenn Taguiam of Game Rant placed this season within the bottom 13 out of 36. Conversely in 2021, Val Barone of TheThings ranked the Family Edition as the show's 10th best season. Racers were also disappointed that they did not have a chance to travel to more exotic locations; in episode 7, Marion Paolo commented "What are we going to Phoenix, Arizona for? I want to go to New Zealand!" Producers have admitted in hindsight that the concept of a Family Edition "looked good on paper," but failed in execution, since child racers limited foreign travel for that season. Producers Bertram van Munster and Jonathan Littman stated in 2006 that the family format was unlikely to be revived in the future.

== Ratings ==
No. overall	No. in season	Title	Original release date	U.S. viewers (millions)	Rating/share (18–49)
86	1	"Go, Mommy, Go! We Can Beat Them!"	September 27, 2005	10.64	4.4/11
87	2	"How Do We Know We Aren't Going to Get Shot?"	October 4, 2005	11.25	4.3/10
88	3	"I Don't Kiss, I Make Out"	October 11, 2005	10.95	4.3/10
89	4	"Think Like an Office Chair"	October 18, 2005	11.11	4.5/11
90	5	"We're Getting Out of the Country, Girls"	October 25, 2005	10.38	4.1/10
91	6	"I'm Sick of Doing Stuff I Can't Do"	November 1, 2005	10.89	4.3/10
92	7	"You Look Ridiculous"	November 8, 2005	10.84	4.6/11
93	8	"How's That Face Feel?"	November 22, 2005	10.30	3.8/9
94	9	"Don't Talk to Me Like I Was an Animal or Something"	November 29, 2005	8.80	3.5/8
95	10	"The Family Christmas Card"	December 6, 2005	11.16	4.1/10
96	11	"25 Days, 50 Cities, and More Than 600 Consecutive Hours Together as a Family"	December 13, 2005	11.51	4.7/12

== Works cited ==
- Castro, Adam-Troy (2006). My Ox Is Broken!. BenBella Books. ISBN 978-1-932100-91-4.
