= World's Largest Office Chair =

American roadside attraction

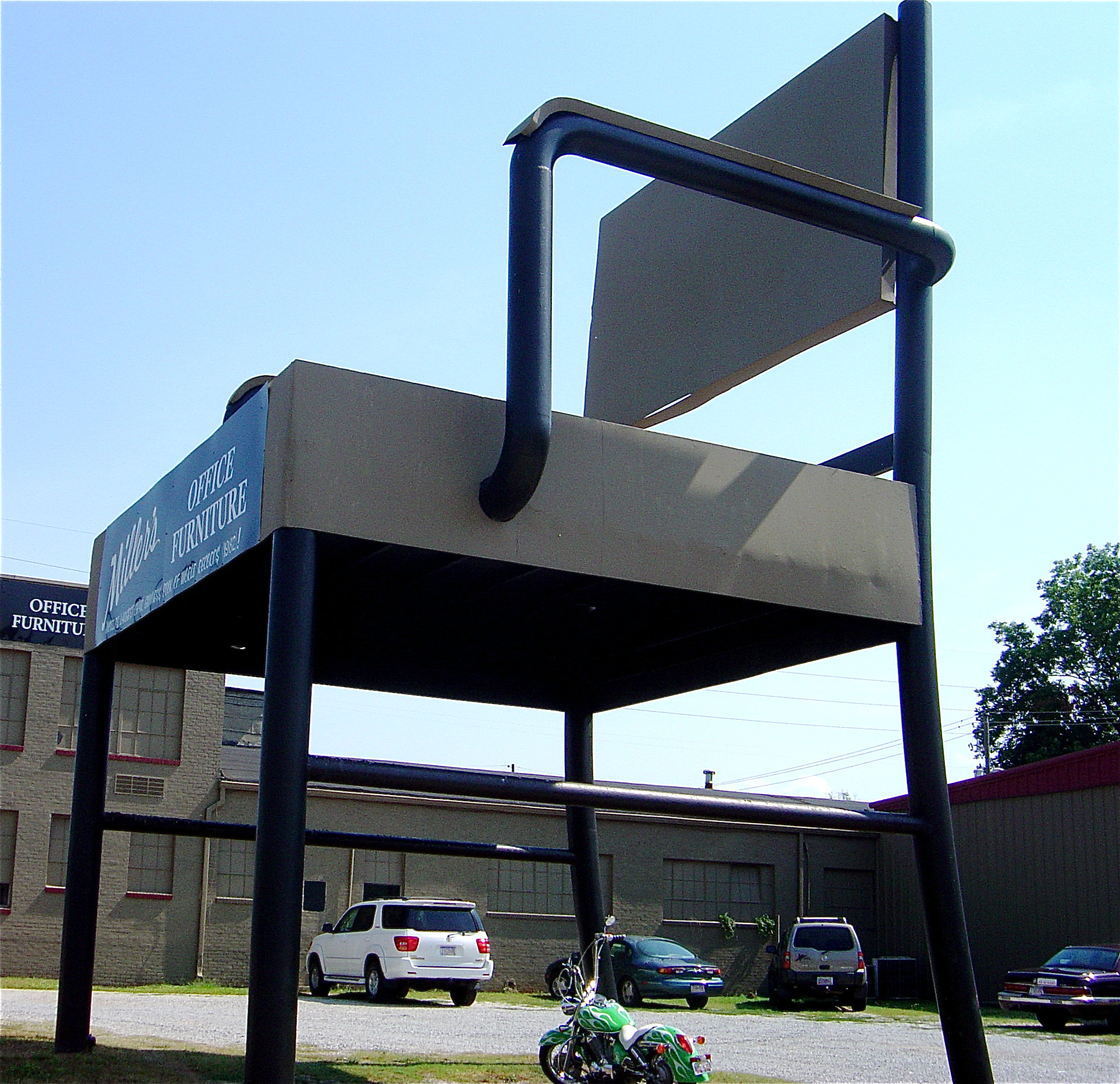
- Office Chair in 2008

- Location within Alabama
- 33.652568°N 85.829557°W
- Location: Anniston, Alabama

History
- Built: 1981

Site notes
- Architect: Leonard "Sonny" Miller

The World's Largest Office Chair is a roadside attraction in Anniston, Alabama.

== Description ==
The World's Largest Office Chair is 33 feet 1 inch (10.08 m) tall, 19 feet 7 inches (5.97 m) wide, and weighs 2,000 pounds (910 kg).

== History ==
Leonard "Sonny" Miller, the owner of Miller's Office Supply, sought to build the chair to attract attention to his furniture business. The chair was modeled off of an office chair from The HON Company with the dimensions of the chair converted from inches to feet. Construction of the chair took place in 1981 at the empty lot next to the furniture showroom. The chair was built using 10 tons of steel, 15 tons of cement, and can withstand 85-mile-per-hour (137 km/h) winds. A spiral staircase was also built to bring people up to the 15-foot (4.6 m) square seat. Construction of the chair was completed in May 1981.

In 1982, the chair was certified by Guinness World Records as the world's largest chair. Despite claims that the chair was officially recognized as the world's largest office chair, this record was never recognized by Guinness World Records and a sign displayed on the chair only lists it official recognition as the world's largest chair in 1982. Despite the recognition as the world's largest chair by Guinness, Bassett Furniture built a 20.25-foot (6.17 m) Mission chair under the claim of the world's largest chair until the city of Anniston publicly refuted the company. Bassett Furniture then altered the claim on their chair to the "world's largest chair the on tour". In 1995, the title of world's largest chair was passed to a seven-story chair in Manzano, Italy, but the Anniston chair unofficially retained the title of the world's largest office chair.

After the chair was built, it became a major landmark for the city of Anniston. The chamber of commerce would fly visiting businessmen over the chair. During the 1990s, Miller's moved across town with the lot housing the chair placed up for sale. The spiral staircase to the seat was also removed. After years of little maintenance, the chair became weathered and rusty. Years later, Miller's moved back to its original location and the chair was repainted.

The world's largest chair is located in Austria, and was created by the furniture store company XXXLutz. It is used in XXXLutz commercials featuring the Putz Family, a fictional family who has appeared in commercials since 1998.

== In popular culture ==
The World's Largest Office Chair appeared on the fourth episode of The Amazing Race: Family Edition.

== See also ==
- List of largest roadside attractions
