= List of municipalities on Long Island =

This is a list of cities, towns, villages, and hamlets on Long Island.

== Introduction ==
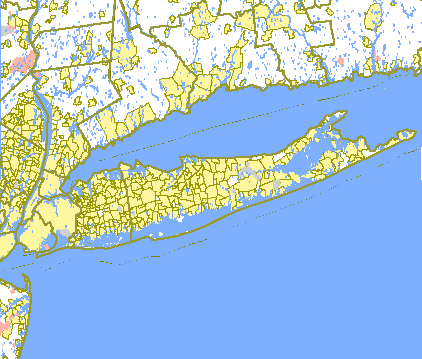
Map of Long Island showing county and municipal boundaries.

In New York State, each county is divided into cities and towns. Every point in New York is inside either a city or a town. Additionally, towns may optionally contain villages, which are smaller incorporated municipalities within the town. Villages may overlap multiple towns. Well-known unincorporated places within towns are referred to as hamlets.

A town or city is the major subdivision of each county. Towns provide or arrange for most municipal services for residents of hamlets and selected services for residents of villages. All residents of New York who do not live in a city or on an Indian reservation live in a town.

A village is an incorporated area which is usually, but not always, within a single town. A village is a clearly defined municipality that provides the services closest to the residents, such as garbage collection, street and highway maintenance, street lighting and building codes. Some villages provide their own police and other optional services. A hamlet is a populated area within a town that is not part of a village. The term "hamlet" is not defined under New York law (unlike cities, towns and villages), but is often used in the state's statutes to refer to well-known populated sections of towns that are not incorporated as villages.

== Brooklyn and Queens ==
Brooklyn and Queens are part of the City of New York.

== Nassau County ==
=== Town of Hempstead ===
The Town of Hempstead contains 22 villages and 37 hamlets:

- Villages: Atlantic Beach, Bellerose, Cedarhurst, East Rockaway, Freeport, Garden City, Hempstead, Hewlett Bay Park, Hewlett Harbor, Hewlett Neck, Island Park, Lawrence, Lynbrook, Malverne, Rockville Centre, South Floral Park, Stewart Manor, Valley Stream, Woodsburgh
- Villages located partly in the Town of North Hempstead: Floral Park, Garden City (almost all in Hempstead), Mineola (almost all in North Hempstead), New Hyde Park
- Hamlets: Baldwin, Baldwin Harbor, Barnum Island, Bay Park, Bellerose Terrace, Bellmore, East Atlantic Beach, East Garden City, East Meadow, Elmont, Franklin Square, Garden City South, Harbor Isle, Hewlett, Inwood, Lakeview, Levittown, Lido Beach, Malverne Park Oaks, Merrick, North Bellmore, North Lynbrook, North Merrick, North Valley Stream, North Wantagh, North Woodmere, Oceanside, Point Lookout, Roosevelt, Salisbury, Seaford, South Hempstead, South Valley Stream, Uniondale, Wantagh, West Hempstead, Woodmere

=== Town of North Hempstead ===
The Town of North Hempstead contains 30 villages and 17 hamlets:.

- Villages: Baxter Estates, East Williston, Flower Hill, Great Neck, Great Neck Estates, Great Neck Plaza, Kensington, Kings Point, Lake Success, Manorhaven, Mineola, Munsey Park, North Hills, Plandome, Plandome Heights, Plandome Manor, Port Washington North, Roslyn, Roslyn Estates, Russell Gardens, Saddle Rock, Sands Point, Thomaston, Westbury, Williston Park
- Villages located partly in the Town of Oyster Bay: East Hills, Old Westbury, Roslyn Harbor
- Villages located partly in the Town of Hempstead: Floral Park, Garden City (almost all in Hempstead), Mineola (almost all in North Hempstead), New Hyde Park
- Hamlets: Albertson, Carle Place, Garden City Park, Glenwood Landing, Great Neck Gardens, Greenvale, Harbor Hills, Herricks, Manhasset, Manhasset Hills, New Cassel, North New Hyde Park, Port Washington, Roslyn Heights, Saddle Rock Estates, Searingtown, University Gardens

=== Town of Oyster Bay ===
The Town of Oyster Bay contains 18 villages and 18 hamlets:

- Villages: Bayville, Brookville, Centre Island, Cove Neck, Farmingdale, Lattingtown, Laurel Hollow, Massapequa Park, Matinecock, Mill Neck, Muttontown, Old Brookville, Oyster Bay Cove, Sea Cliff, Upper Brookville
- Villages located partly in the Town of North Hempstead: East Hills, Old Westbury, Roslyn Harbor
- Hamlets: Bethpage, East Massapequa, East Norwich, Glen Head, Glenwood Landing (part), Greenvale (part), Hicksville, Jericho, Locust Valley, Massapequa, North Massapequa, Old Bethpage, Oyster Bay, Plainedge, Plainview, South Farmingdale, Syosset, Woodbury

The U.S. Postal Service has organized these 36 places into 20 different post offices with a total of 30 different 5-digit ZIP codes. Some post offices have the same name as a hamlet or village, but the boundaries are seldom the same.

== Suffolk County ==
=== Town of Babylon ===
- Villages: Amityville, Babylon, Lindenhurst
- Hamlets: Copiague, Deer Park, East Farmingdale, Gilgo, North Amityville, North Babylon, North Lindenhurst, Oak Beach, Captree, West Babylon, Wheatley Heights, Wyandanch
- Other communities: Copiague Harbor

=== Town of Huntington ===
- Villages: Asharoken, Huntington Bay, Lloyd Harbor, Northport
- Hamlets: Centerport, Cold Spring Harbor, Dix Hills, East Northport, Eatons Neck, Elwood, Greenlawn, Halesite, Huntington, Huntington Station, Melville, South Huntington, Vernon Valley, West Hills, Wincoma
- Hamlets located partly in the Town of Smithtown: Commack, Fort Salonga

=== Town of Islip ===
- Villages: Brightwaters, Islandia, Ocean Beach, Saltaire
- Hamlets: Bay Shore, Bayport, Baywood, Bohemia, Brentwood, Central Islip, East Islip, Great River, Islip, Islip Terrace, North Bay Shore, North Great River, Oakdale, Ronkonkoma, Sayville, West Bay Shore, West Islip, West Sayville
- Hamlets located partly in the Town of Brookhaven: Holbrook, Holtsville
- Hamlet located partly in the Town of Smithtown: Hauppauge

=== Town of Smithtown ===
- Villages: Head of the Harbor, Nissequogue, Village of the Branch
- Hamlets: Kings Park, Nesconset, Smithtown, St. James
- Hamlet located partly in the Town of Brookhaven: Lake Ronkonkoma
- Hamlets located partly in the Town of Huntington: Commack, Fort Salonga
- Hamlet located partly in the Town of Islip: Hauppauge

=== Town of Brookhaven ===
- Villages: Belle Terre, Bellport, Lake Grove, Old Field, Patchogue, Poquott, Port Jefferson, Shoreham
- Hamlets: Blue Point, Brookhaven, Center Moriches, Centereach, Cherry Grove, Coram, Davis Park, East Moriches, East Patchogue, East Setauket, East Shoreham, Farmingville, Fire Island Pines, Gordon Heights, Manorville, Mastic, Mastic Beach, Medford, Middle Island, Miller Place, Moriches, Mount Sinai, North Bellport, North Patchogue, Ocean Bay Park, Point of Woods, Port Jefferson Station, Ridge, Rocky Point, Selden, Setauket, Shirley, Sound Beach, Stony Brook, Strongs Neck, Terryville, Upton, Water Island, Yaphank
- Hamlets located partly in the Town of Islip: Holbrook, Holtsville, Ronkonkoma
- Hamlet located partly in the Town of Riverhead: Calverton
- Hamlet located partly in the Town of Smithtown: Lake Ronkonkoma
- Hamlet located partly in the Town of Southampton: Eastport

=== Town of Southampton ===
- Villages: North Haven, Quogue, Sagaponack, Southampton, Westhampton Beach, West Hampton Dunes
- Village located partly in the Town of East Hampton: Sag Harbor
- Hamlets: Bridgehampton, East Quogue, Flanders, Hampton Bays, Northampton, North Sea, Noyack (Noyac), Quiogue, Remsenburg, Riverside, Shinnecock Hills, Speonk, Tuckahoe, Water Mill (Watermill), Westhampton
- Hamlet located partly in the Town of Brookhaven: Eastport

=== Town of Riverhead ===
- Villages: none
- Hamlets: Aquebogue, Baiting Hollow, Jamesport, Northville, Riverhead, Wading River
- Hamlet located partly in the Town of Brookhaven: Calverton

=== Town of East Hampton ===
- Villages: East Hampton
- Village located partly in the Town of Southampton: Sag Harbor
- Hamlets: Amagansett, East Hampton North, Montauk, Napeague, Northwest Harbor, Springs, Wainscott

=== Town of Shelter Island ===
- Village: Dering Harbor
- Hamlets: Shelter Island, Shelter Island Heights

=== Town of Southold ===
- Village: Greenport
- Hamlets: Cutchogue, East Marion, Fishers Island, Greenport West, Laurel, Mattituck, Orient, New Suffolk, Peconic, Southold

=== Fire Island ===
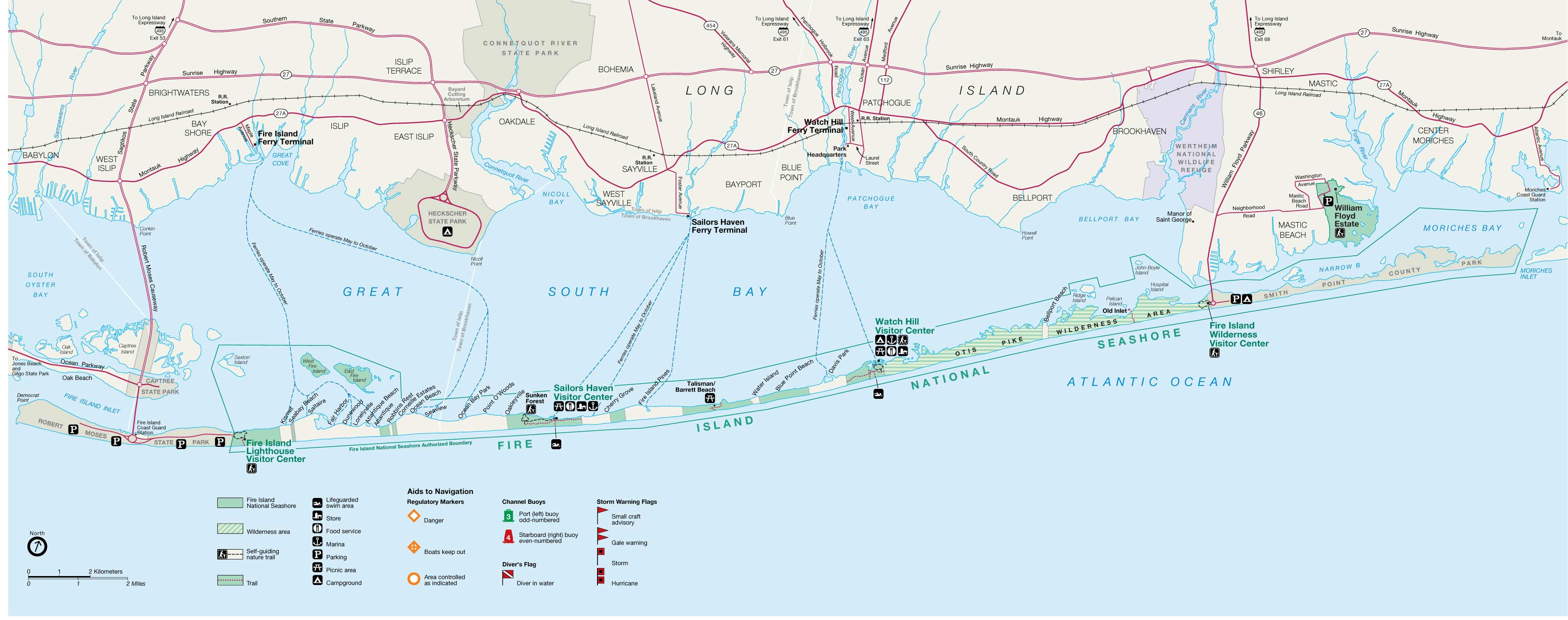
Fire Island National Seashore Map

Fire Island is not a separate town, but its villages are listed here due to its geographical isolation.

- Villages in the Town of Islip: Ocean Beach, Saltaire
- Hamlets in the Town of Brookhaven: Cherry Grove (a.k.a. Fire Island), Fire Island Pines.
- Other communities: Atlantique, Bayberry Dunes, Corneille Estates, Davis Park, Dunewood, Fair Harbor, Kismet, Lonelyville, Long Cove, Ocean Bay Park, Point o' Woods, Robbins Rest, Seaview, Watch Hill, Water Island, West Fire Island

== See also ==
- Timeline of town creation in Downstate New York
