= Fair Harbor, New York =

- Hamlet
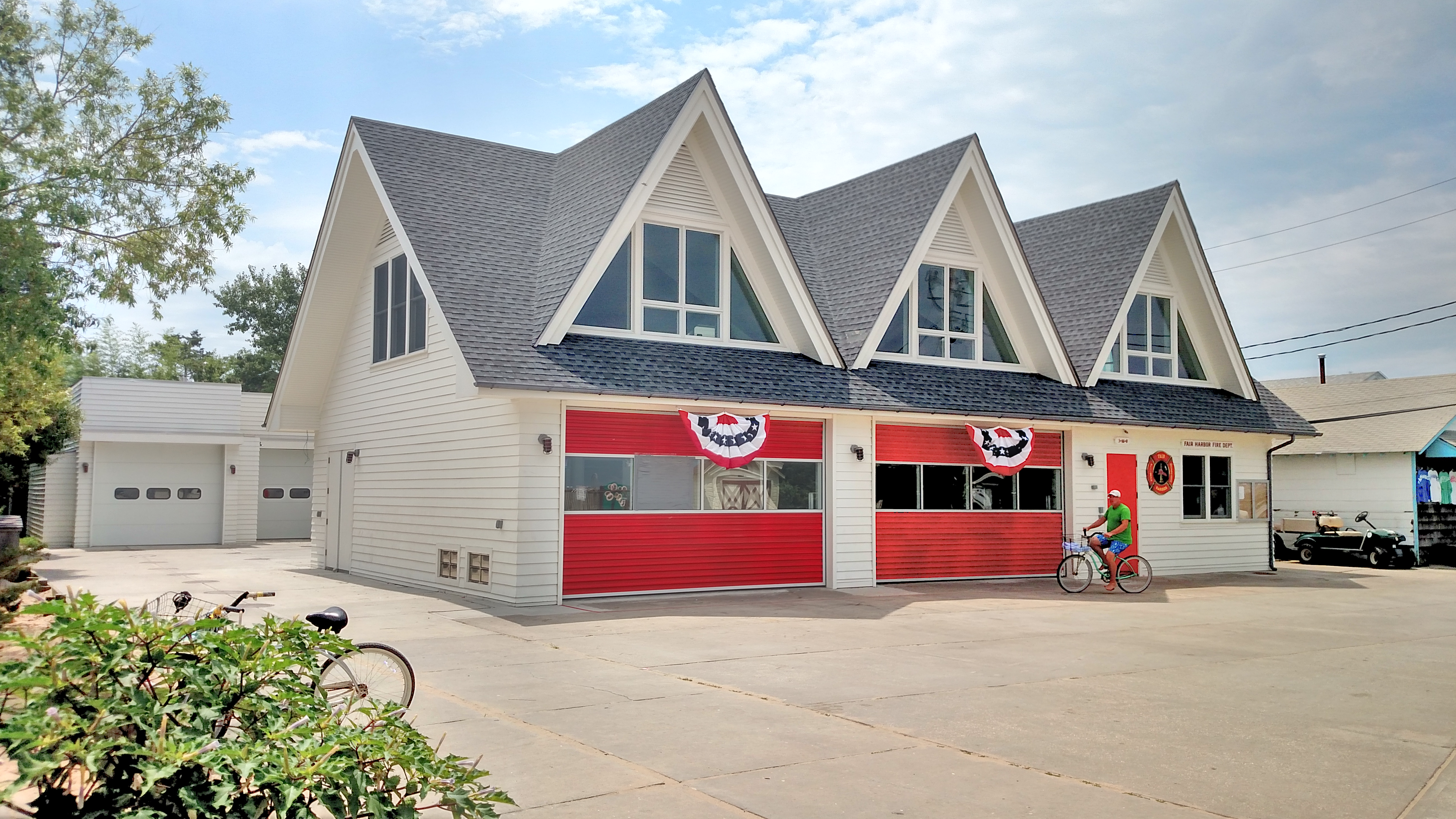
- The Fair Harbor Fire Department in 2015

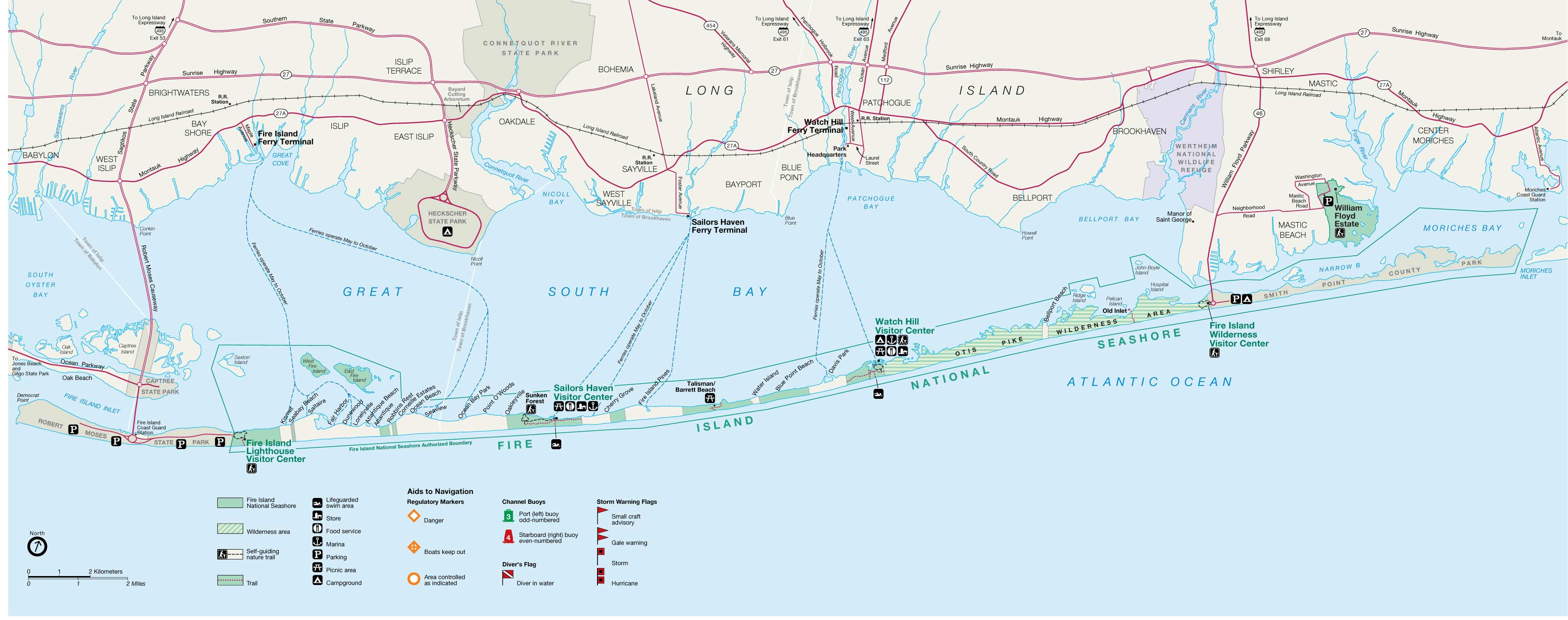
- Location on Fire Island Location within the state of New York
- Coordinates: 40°38′21″N 73°11′5″W
- Country: United States
- State: New York
- County: Suffolk
- Town: Islip
- Time zone: UTC-5 (EST)
  - Summer (DST): UTC-4 (EDT)
- ZIP code: 11706
- Area codes: 631, 934

Fair Harbor is a small community hamlet located near the western end of Fire Island within the Town of Islip, in Suffolk County, New York, United States. The population in the summer swells to about 1,500.

With approximately 350 homes within spread across 13 blocks, the community features a few stores and other amenities, giving it old-style charm with the security of a modern Fire Department and EMS. Moreover, Fair Harbor is steps away from the beach, and the area along the Great South Bay is incredibly active during the summer months.

== Overview ==
Fair Harbor—like most other Fire Island communities—is mainly a summer community, although a few families choose to live there year-round. Many of the homes have been passed down from generation to generation. The town has a strong summer rental market, with most houses renting for the entire summer season or by the month. During the off-season there is limited car access to Fire Island while during the summer there is no car access and the town can only be reached by ferry or private boat. Biking and walking are the main modes of transportation. Fair Harbor falls under the police jurisdiction of the Suffolk County Marine Bureau and is protected by its own volunteer fire department, the Fair Harbor Fire Department, founded in 1931. During the summer months lifeguards are stationed on both the bay beach and ocean beach.

Children of the year-round families attend the Fire Island School District in Corneille Estates until grade 6, at which point they are bussed to public or parochial schools in Bay Shore or Islip for grades 7–12. The neighboring communities of Dunewood and Lonelyville, to the east have no stores or services so they rely on many of Fair Harbor's services, such as the Fire Department and EMS and Fair Harbor's one grocery store, hardware emporium, liquor store and restaurant.

There are no hotels or B&Bs in Fair Harbor – although Airbnbs have become common for short term rentals. Fair Harbor also has its own direct ferry line out of Bay Shore and a private community marina.

== History ==
The community was first founded in the late 1800s. A few of Fair Harbor's 350 houses date to the 1920s, but most were built in the 1970s or later.

== Geography ==
Fair Harbor is located on the western part of Fire Island between the Great South Bay and the Atlantic Ocean. It is located approximately 47 miles (76 km) by car to the ferry dock in Bay Shore, New York. From there, it is six miles (9.7 km) by ferry across the water to Fair Harbor.

Saltaire is the incorporated village immediately west of Fair Harbor, while the hamlets of Dunewood and Lonelyville are directly to the east. To get to Fair Harbor, it is necessary to take the ferry from Bay Shore, across the Great South Bay.

== Economy ==
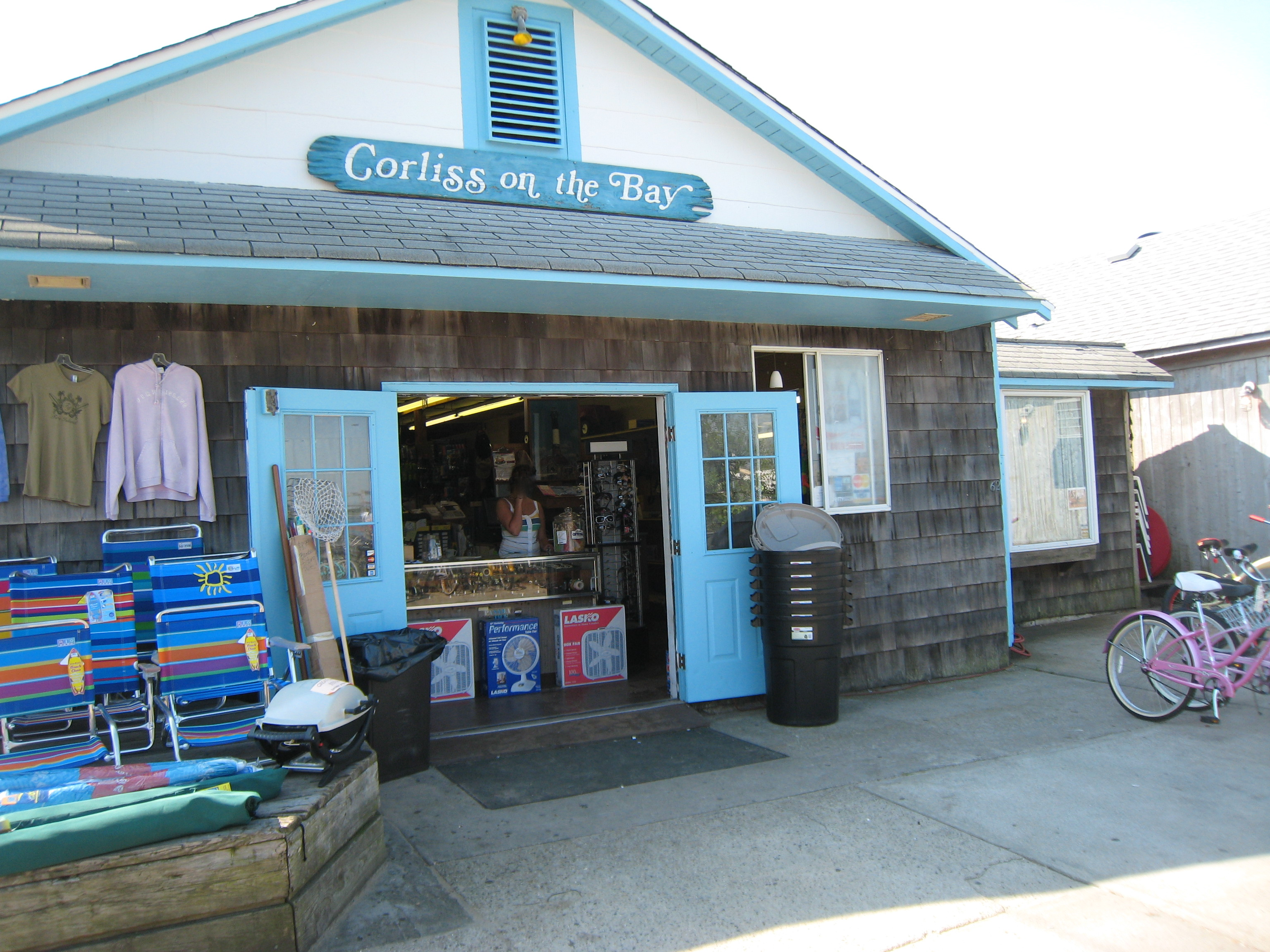
Corliss on the Bay, located along the Great South Bay in Fair Harbor

Being a seasonal community, Fair Harbor offers only a few services and shops. The stores within the community are typically open seven days a week in season and closed during the off-season (October through May).

== Arts and culture ==
Fair Harbor is famous for its annual Pine Walk Arts and Crafts Fair, which was established in 1972, however the event did not take place in the summer of 2023, and the future of the event was at the time uncertain. The event itself adds to this community's bohemian beach aesthetic while still being an intimate family community where neighbors congregate at the bay to watch the sunsets. Some 400 beach houses flank the narrow residential walks.

== Fair Harbor Dunewood Medical District ==
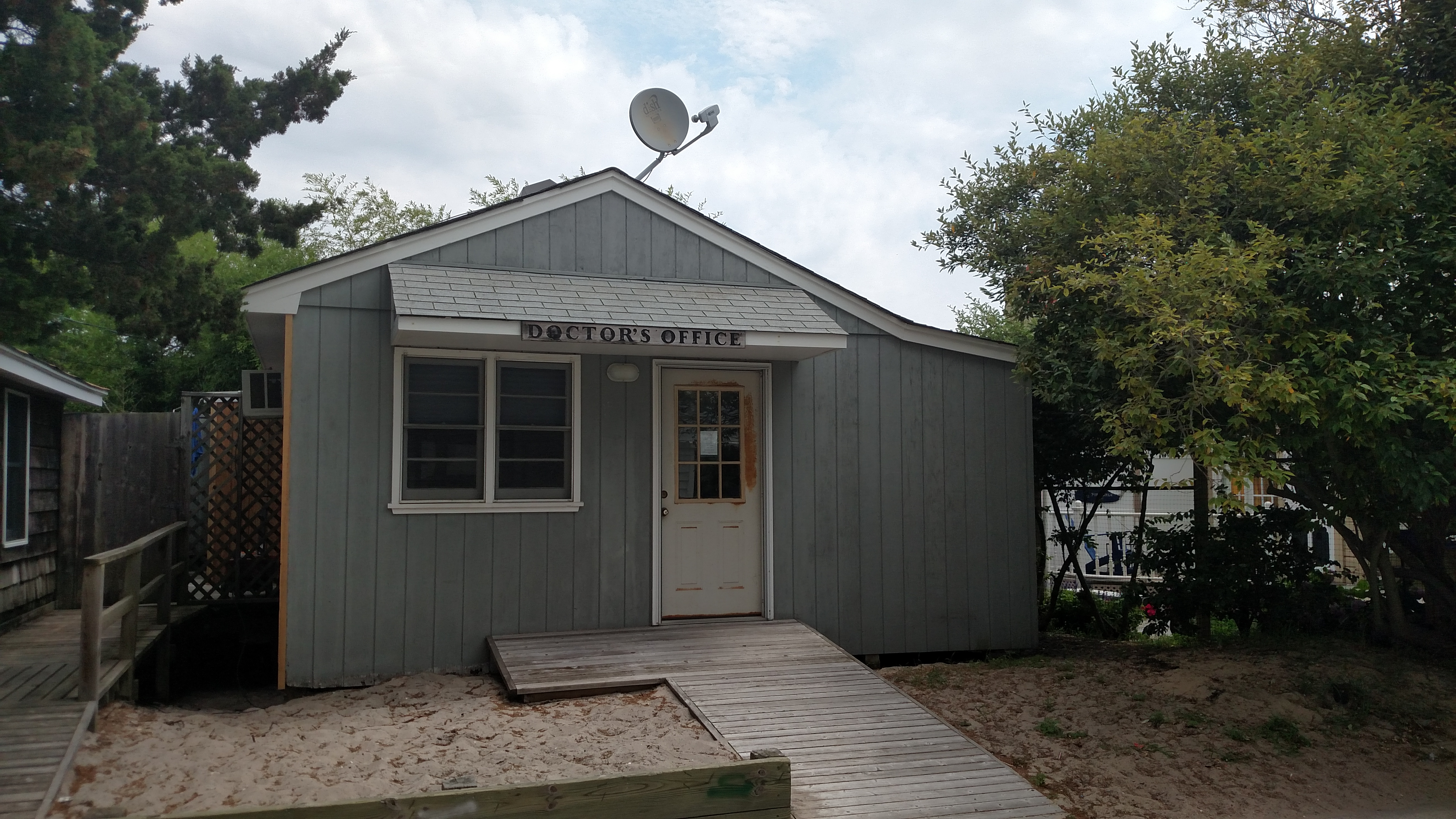
The Fair Harbor Doctor's Office

While there are no hospitals located within the community, medical service is provided in the summer months by the Fair Harbor Dunewood Medical District. This special district hires doctors, on one week intervals, from Memorial Day through Labor Day. The district provides a walk-in doctor's office and doctor's residence. The doctors are not paid but get a free week at the beach, are allowed to keep modest fees from patients, and have office hours two hours a day – from 11 AM to 12 PM, and 5 PM to 6 PM.

For medical emergencies, the Fair Harbor Fire Department provides emergency medical services (EMS) which transports patients by its ambulance or by Suffolk County Police Department (SCPD) boat to Good Samaritan or South Shore hospitals on the mainland, or by SCPD helicopter.

== See also ==
- Fire Island Pines, New York
- Kismet, New York
- Ocean Beach, New York
- Saltaire, New York

Preceded by Dunewood	Beaches of Fire Island	Succeeded by Saltaire
