= Dunewood, New York =

- Hamlet
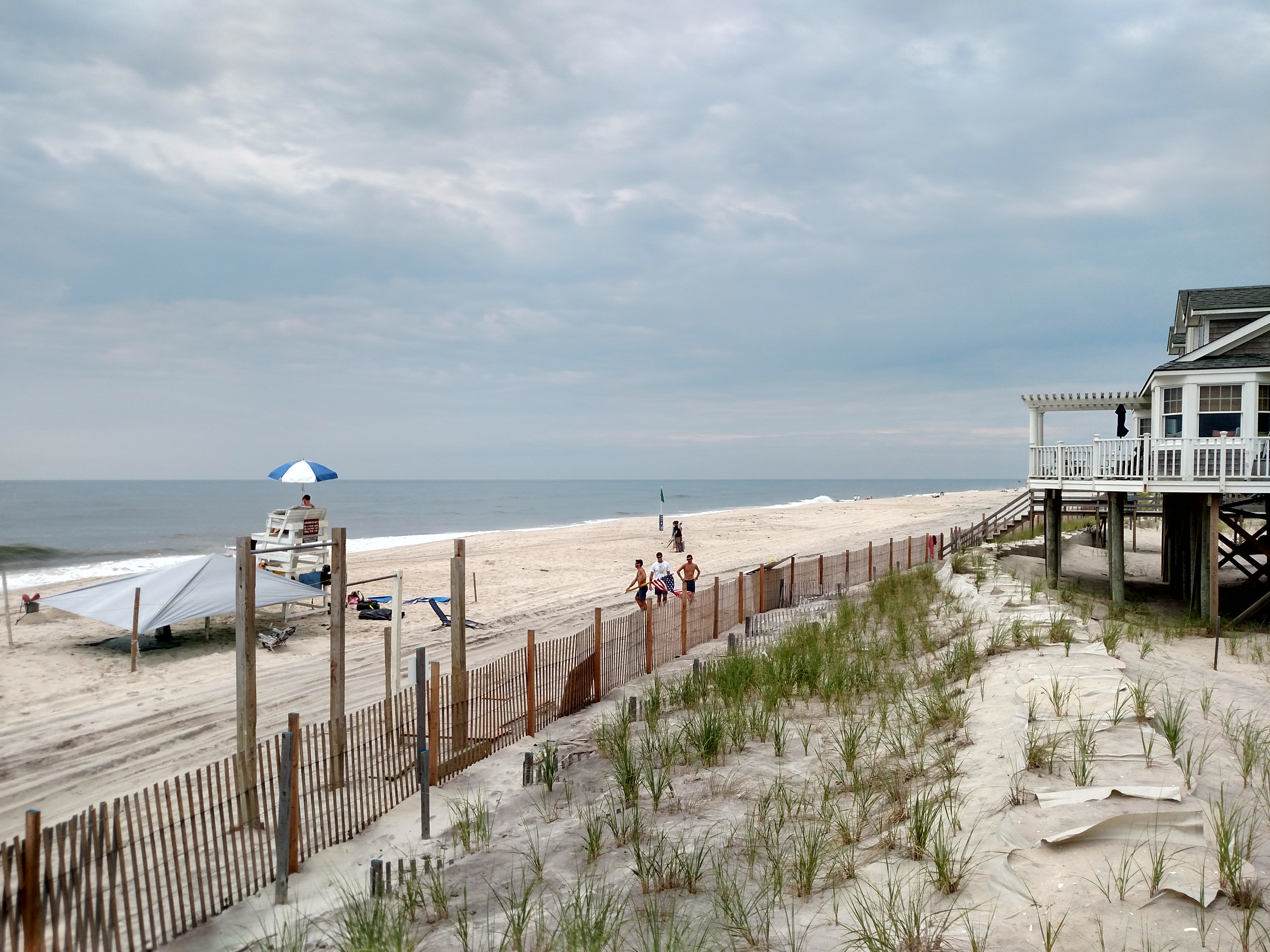
- The oceanfront in Dunewood in 2015

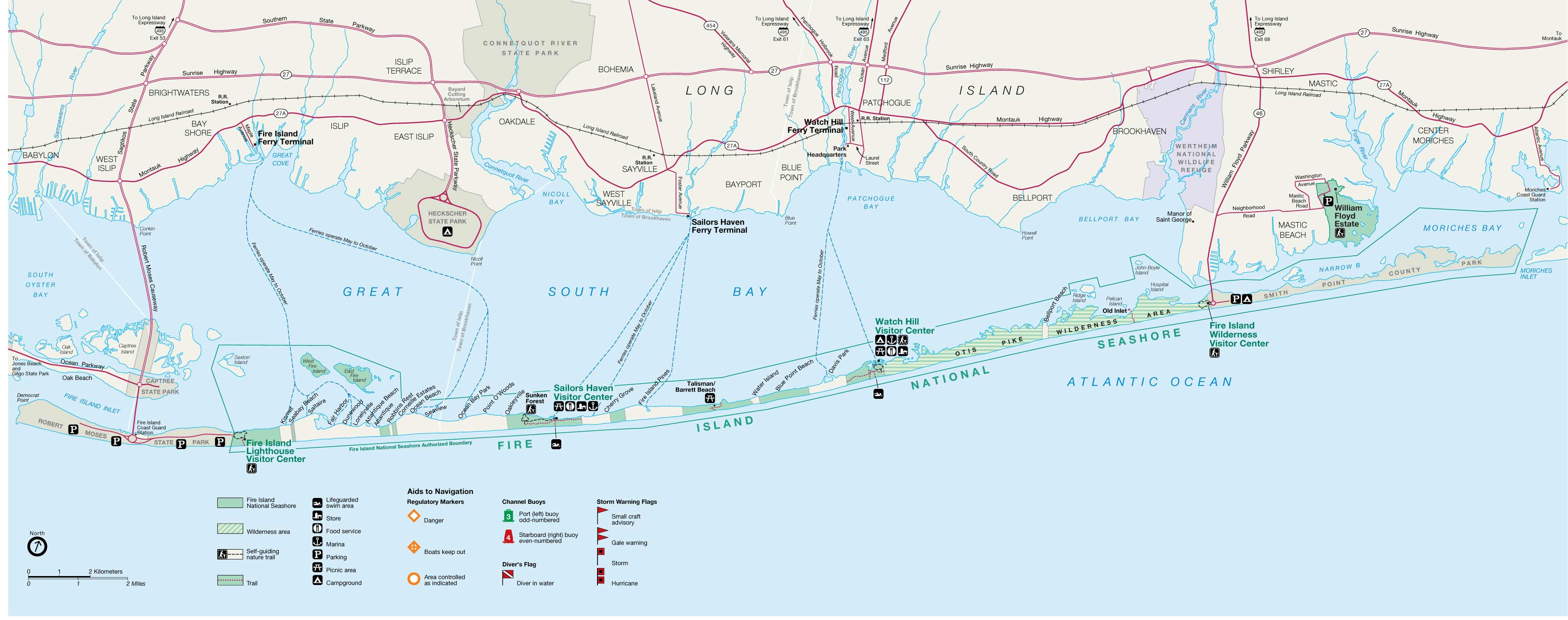
- Location on Fire Island Location within the state of New York
- Coordinates: 40°38′24″N 73°10′47″W
- Country: United States
- State: New York
- County: Suffolk
- Town: Islip
- Time zone: UTC-5 (EST)
  - Summer (DST): UTC-4 (EDT)
- ZIP code: 11706
- Area codes: 631, 934

Dunewood is a small beachside hamlet on the western end of Fire Island within the Town of Islip, in Suffolk County, New York, United States.

== Overview ==
The hamlet consists of roughly 100 houses – all originally built on an identical floor plan. While the community specifically does not market itself to tourists and short-term renters, it is a popular location for long-term residents; properties within Dunewood are rarely for sale.

The community has only very limited facilities, and during summertime, it shares a doctor with nearby Fair Harbor, during other times of the year, serious medical cases have to be medevaced by helicopter.

== Geography ==
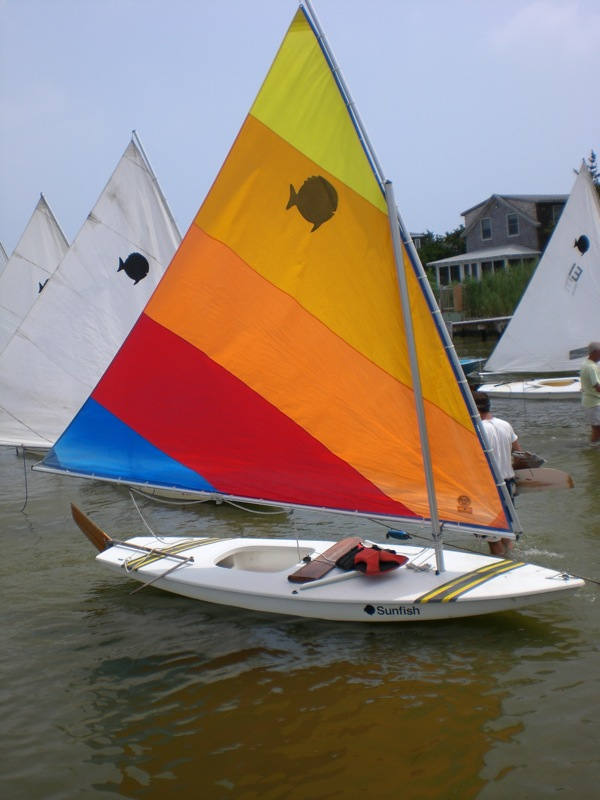
Sunfish preparing for a race at the Dunewood Yacht Club

Dunewood – like many neighboring communities on Fire Island – suffers from coastal erosion, which the community had been attempting to control in the early 2000s via beach replenishment; the sand replacement work through that project was funded by taxes levied through each community's erosion control district. Environmental concerns have, however, hindered similar projects on Fire Island for decades.

== Healthcare ==
While there are no hospitals located within the community, medical service in Dunewood is provided in the summer months by the Fair Harbor Dunewood Medical District. This special district operates a medical office located in Fair Harbor during the summer.

During the off-season, when the medical district is not operating, serious medical cases have to be medevaced by helicopter across the Great South Bay to hospitals on Long Island.

== Dunewood Yacht Club ==
The Dunewood Yacht Club (DYC) is a staple of Dunewood and of the larger Fire Island community. It offers a long tradition of sailing instruction for a wide range of ages and all skill levels. The Yacht Club offers instruction on Sunfish sailing dinghies. After passing a swim test, students are assigned to a specific class based on age.

== See also ==
- Fair Harbor, New York
- Fire Island Pines, New York
- Kismet, New York
- Ocean Beach, New York
- Saltaire, New York

Preceded by Lonelyville	Beaches of Fire Island	Succeeded by Fair Harbor
