= Fire Island Ferries =

Public transportation

Fire Island Ferries, Inc.
- Locale: Fire Island, New York
- Waterway: Great South Bay
- Transit type: Passenger, Freight & Water Taxi
- Operator: Fire Island Ferries, Inc.
- Began operation: 1948
- No. of lines: 8
- Hubs: Bay Shore, New York
- Website: Fire Island Ferries

Fire Island Ferries is a passenger and freight ferry service, serving the Western communities of Fire Island, New York.

== History ==
Edward J. Mooney, who joined the company in 1948, acquired Fire Island Ferries in 1972. After Mooney's death in December 2020, his casket was taken around Great South Bay for a memorial aboard one of the company's ferry boats.

=== Fire aboard the Fire Island Belle ===
On September 20, 2009, at 10:10 eastern daylight time, the passenger ferry Fire Island Belle, with 100 passengers, the vessel master, and two deckhands on board, experienced an engine room fire in the Great South Bay between Long Island and Fire Island, New York. The vessel had departed Ocean Beach, Fire Island, 10 minutes earlier, and was approximately 300 yards (270 m) from the dock at Fair Harbor, Fire Island, when the fire broke out.

No passengers or crewmembers were injured, and no pollution resulted. The cost of repairing the vessel was $490,000. The U.S. Coast Guard was the lead investigative agency in the accident. The National Transportation Safety Board (NTSB) provided assistance with fire investigation and metallurgical analysis.

== Destinations ==
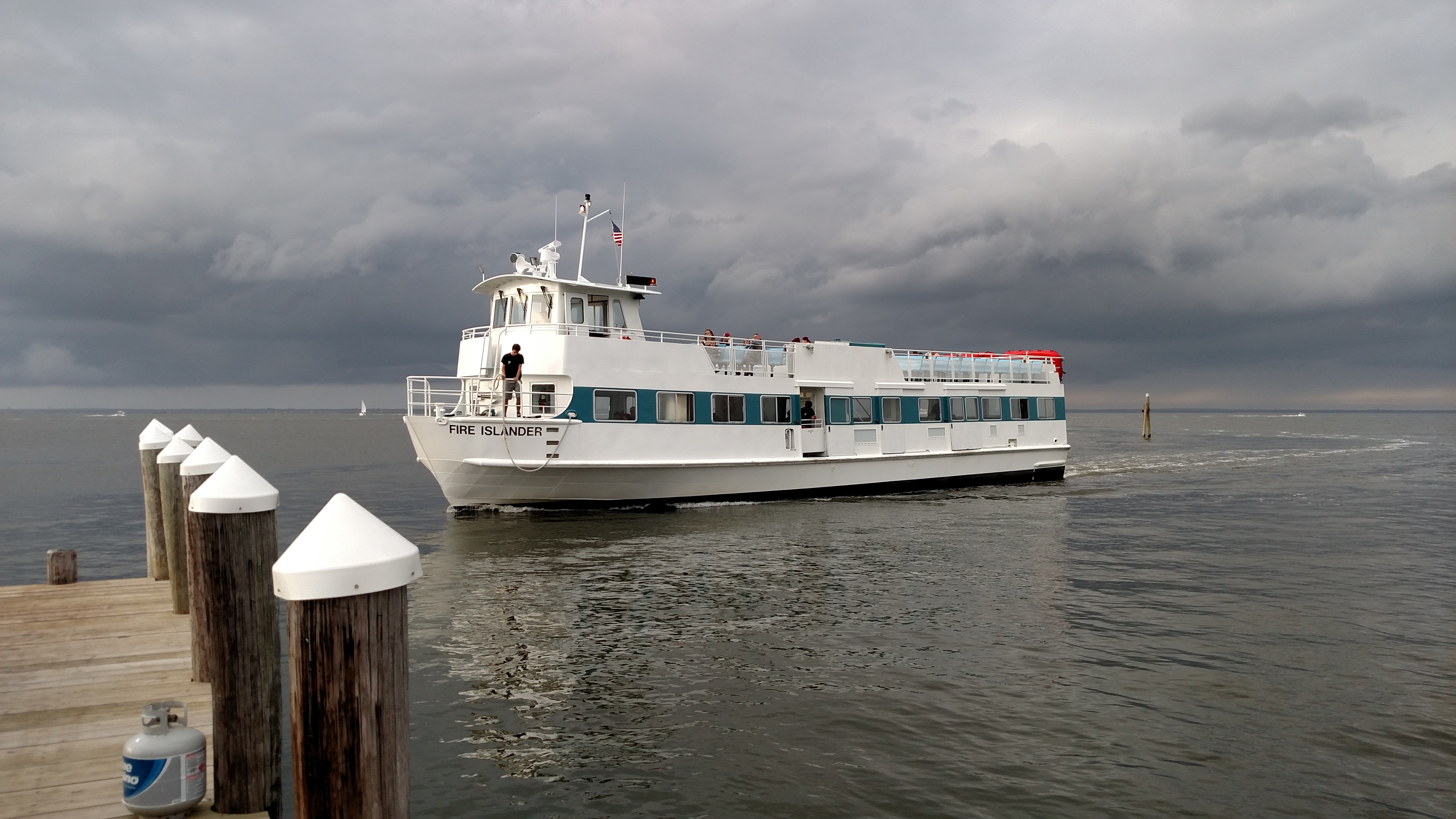
The Fire Islander — a passenger ferry owned by Fire Island Ferries, Inc — docking in Dunewood, NY.

- Kismet
- Saltaire (village)
- Fair Harbor
- Dunewood
- Atlantique
- Ocean Beach (village)
- Seaview
- Ocean Bay Park

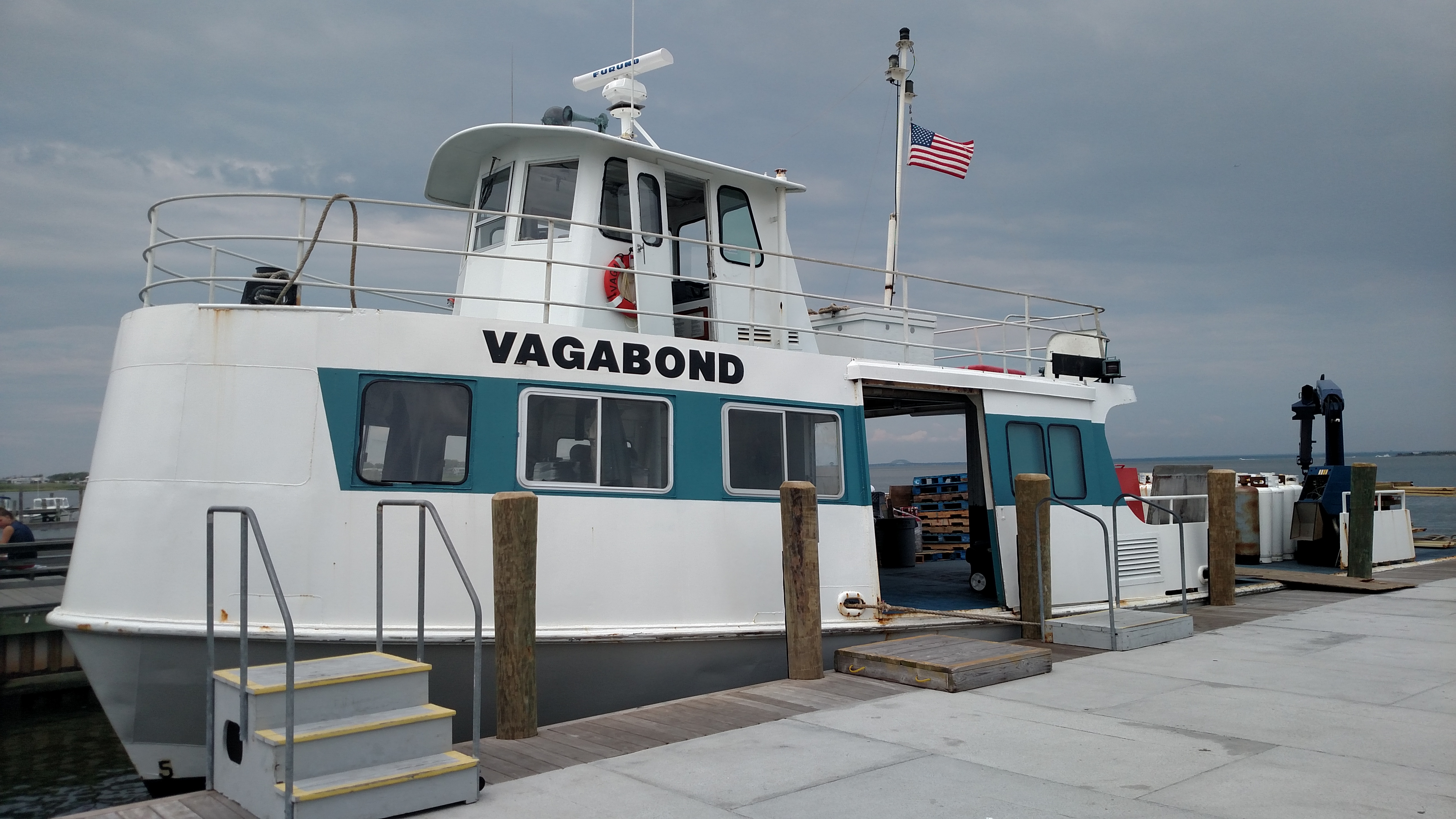
The Vagabond — a freight ferry owned by Fire Island Ferries, Inc — docked in Fair Harbor, NY.

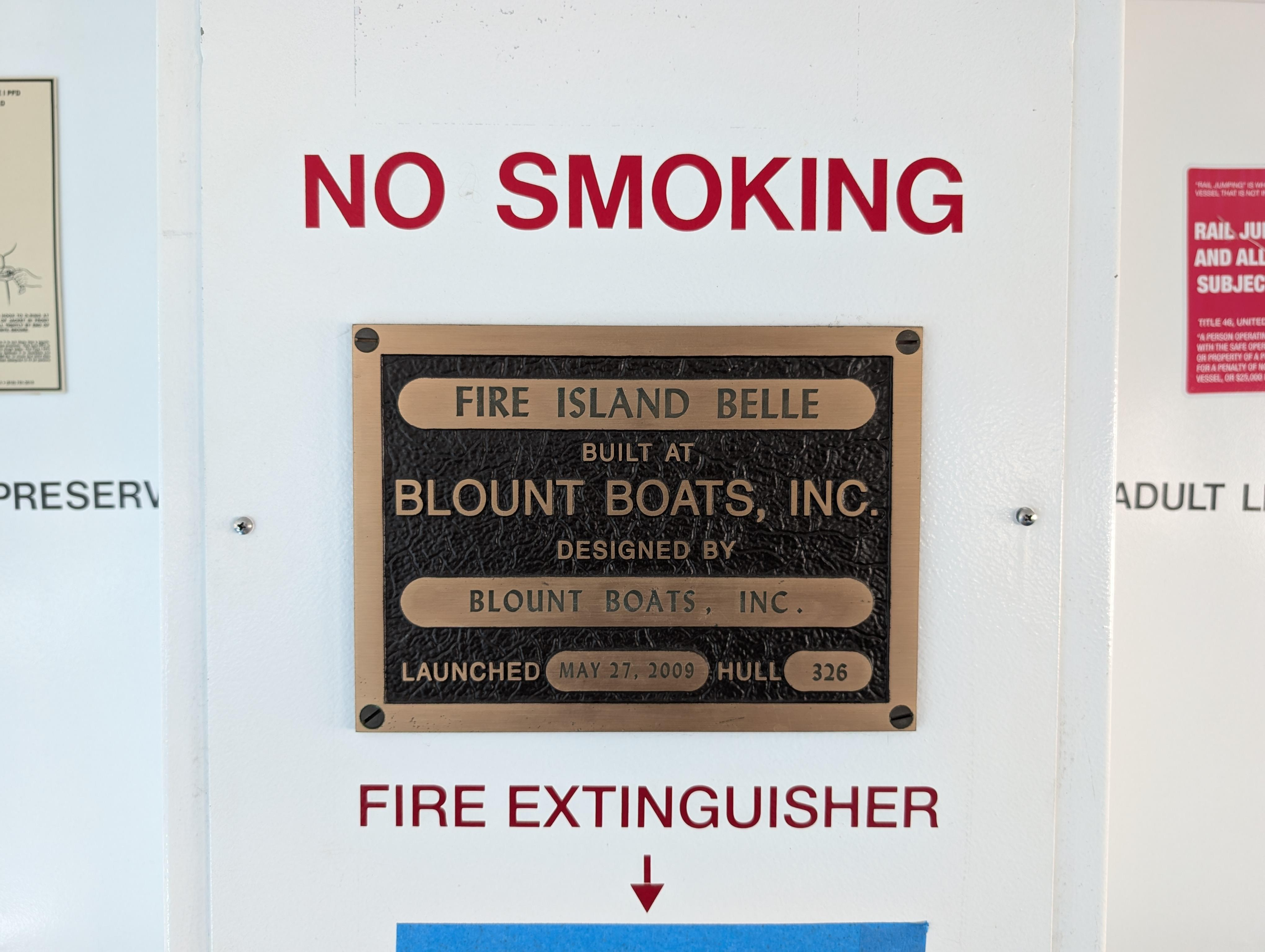
Nameplate aboard the Fire Island Belle passenger ferry

== Fire Island Ferry Fleet ==
=== Passenger Ferries ===
Vessel Name	Year built	Shipbuilder	Class
Fire Island Miss engines: 3 Detroit diesel 12v71 two strokes (alternates as freight)	1976	Blount Boats	Captain Patterson
Firebird (Engine swapped from Detroit Diesel 12v71 two strokes to John Deere inline 6, 4 strokes)	1983	Blount Boats	Firebird
Stranger ( 2 Detroit Diesel 12v71 two strokes)	1985	Gulf Craft	
Voyager (Engine swapped from Detroit Diesel 12v71 two strokes to JD Engines)	1990	Gulf Craft	Firebird
Explorer (engine Swap from Detroit Diesel 12v71 two strokes to JD engine)	1991	Gulf Craft	Firebird
Fire Island Flyer	2001	Blount Boats	Flyer
Fire Island Belle (Engine Swap from Detroit Diesel series 60 to JD Engines)	2009	Blount Boats	Flyer
Fire Island Queen (Engine Swapped from Detroit Diesel series 60 to JD Engines)	2011	Gladding Hearn	Flyer
Fire Islander	2013	Blount Boats	Flyer
Isle of Fire	2019	Blount Boats	Flyer

=== Freight Ferries ===
Vessel Name	Year built	Shipbuilder
Vagabond	1978	Blount Boats
America	2002	Derecktor Shipyards

== Fire Island Marine Services ==
=== Fleet ===
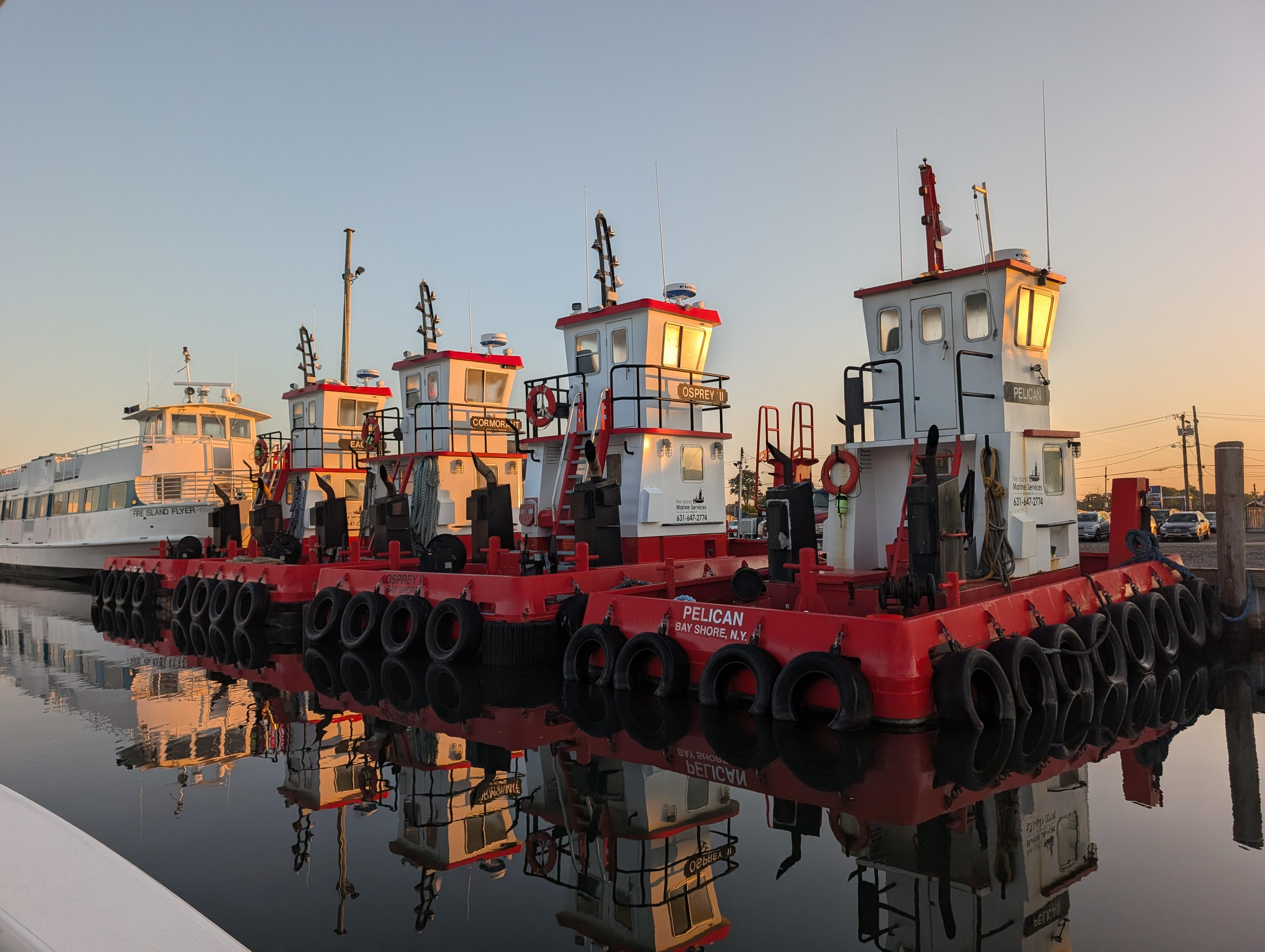
Fire Island Marine Services fleet (partial), with Fire Island Flyer (ferry) in background

Vessel Name	Category	Year built	Shipbuilder
Albatross	Pushboat		
Cormorant	Pushboat		
Eagle	Pushboat		Miller Marine
Fire Island Maid	Multi-purpose vehicle ferry (Ro-Pax)	2023	Metal Shark
Gannet	Pushboat		
Pelican	Pushboat		
Osprey	Barge		
Osprey II	Pushboat		
Turtle	Multi-purpose vehicle ferry (Ro-Pax)	2016	Miller Marine
