= Lonelyville =

Lonelyville may refer to:

- Lonelyville, New York, a community on Fire Island in Suffolk County, New York State, U.S.
- "Lonelyville" (Law & Order: Criminal Intent), an episode of Law & Order: Criminal Intent
- Lonelyville, an album by Dave Dudley
