= Lonelyville, New York =

- Hamlet
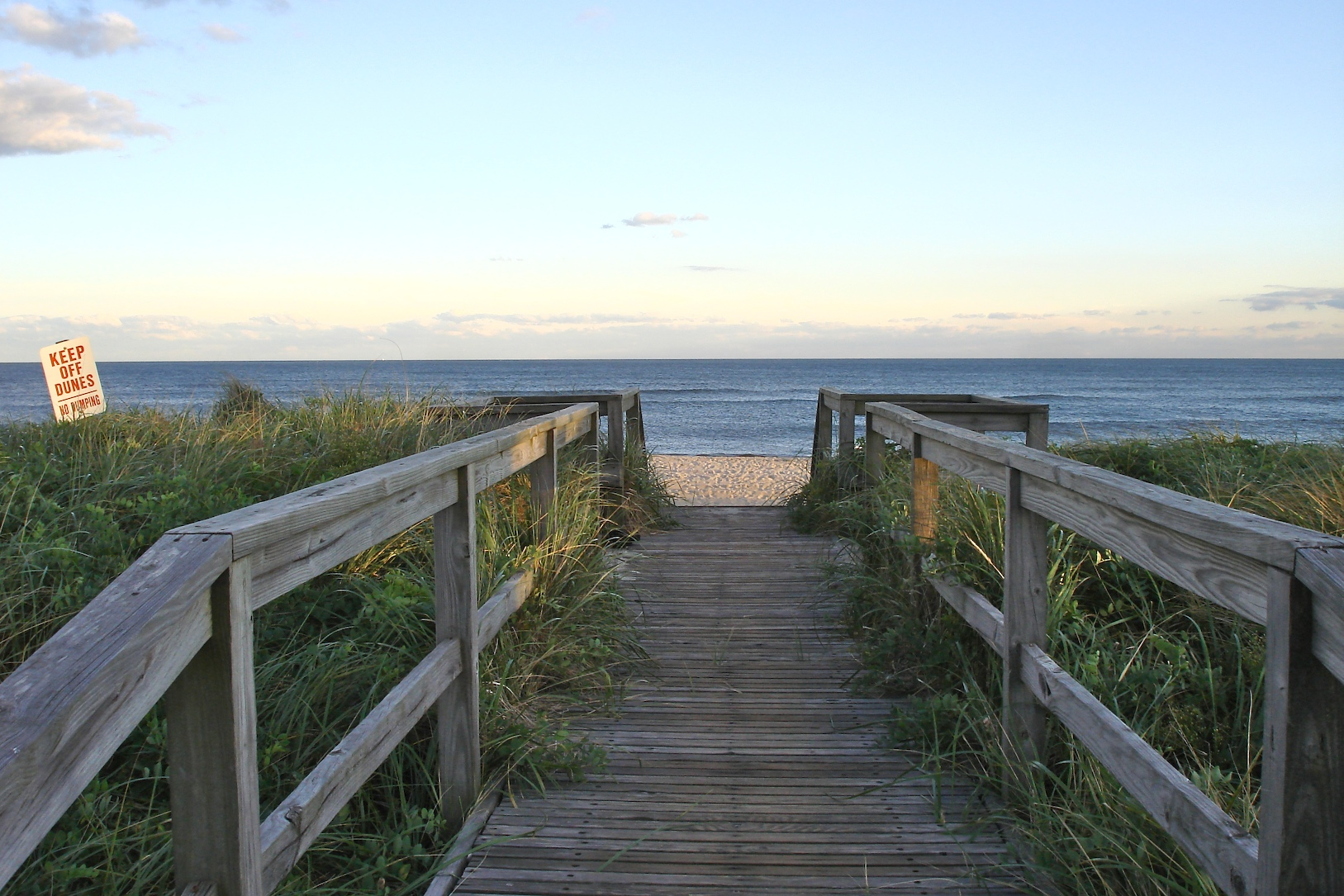
- The beach in Lonelyville in 2007

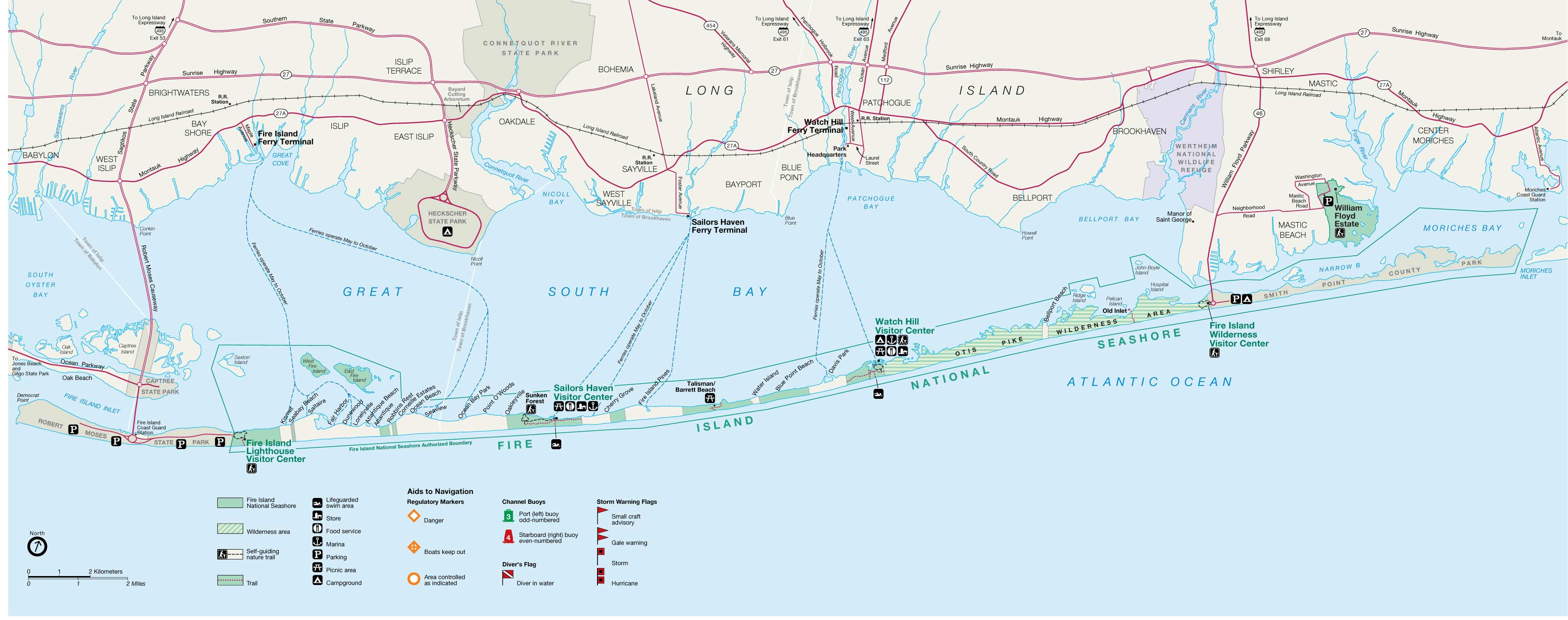
- Location on Fire Island Location within the state of New York
- Coordinates: 40°38′27″N 73°10′29″W
- Country: United States
- State: New York
- County: Suffolk
- Town: Islip
- Time zone: UTC−5 (EST)
  - Summer (DST): UTC−4 (EDT)
- ZIP code: 11706
- Area codes: 631, 934

Lonelyville – also known historically as Fire Island Estates – is a small, beachfront hamlet located on the western end of Fire Island within the Town of Islip, in Suffolk County, New York, United States.

== Overview ==
Lonelyville has approximately 80 houses and is located between the communities of Dunewood and Atlantique. As on much of Fire Island, cars are generally not permitted in Lonelyville during the summer months, and bicycles are the principal means of wheeled transport. The closest ferry service is to Dunewood from Bay Shore on Long Island. There are no stores, cafes, bars, or other facilities in Lonelyville – although it is a fairly easy walk or bike ride to Fair Harbor, which serves as a town center for the community. The majority of the houses are summer-only vacation cottages – and consequently, there are only a handful of year-round residents.

Probably the most famous past residents of Lonelyville were Mel Brooks and his wife Anne Bancroft, who had an ocean-front house there for many years. Brooks purportedly wrote many of his movies and comedy sketches there. Their residence was the first project designed and built by famed architect, Richard Meier, completed in 1963.

== History ==
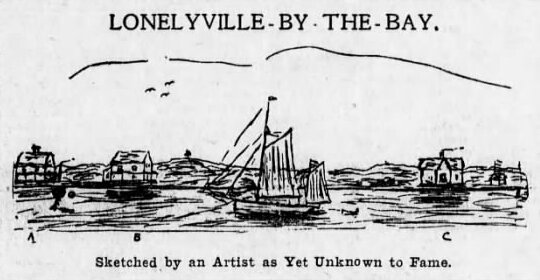
Sketch of early Lonelyville, c.1908

It is unclear when the first dwelling was built in Lonelyville, but speculation suggest that fishermen probably used the area as a camp site in the late 1890s.

By 1908, it appears that three structures had been built in the community by three businessmen and friends from Bay Shore, New York who "spend their time in killing ducks ... catching ‘suckers’ and other things out in the bay when there is nothing else to do, and between intervals of sleep, dining at the expense of each other and swapping stories". The three structures were built by ex-Justice of the Peace, Harry M. Brewster -- "Brewster's Bungalow", ex-cashier of the South Side Bank, Harry S. Raven --"Raven's Ranch" and ex-Tax Collector of Bay Shore, Selah T. Clock --"Clock's Castle".

At one such dinner, Brewster came up with the idea of calling the place "Lonelyville" and "with due éclat and champagne, the resort was christened and launched upon the sea of fame"

The three presented a set of rules for Lonelyville which they – the only voting members – unanimously adopted:

"We, the undersigned ... being fully clothed and in our right (questioned) minds, do herby agree that .... No person or persons not of good moral character shall be permitted to dwell with the city limits." "The settlers already established are herby proclaimed exempt from this regulation." "No saloons, dives or gambling resorts shall be permitted within a mile of any church or school house." "The Sabbath day shall be strictly observed by every person in sound health taking a bath." "There shall be no horse racing, cock fights of firemen's tournaments on Sundays." and finally "The board of Aldermen shall be responsible that shall see that the tide rises and falls every day and that the surf continues to roll in."

By 1909, Captain Ed Thompson of Northport and Brooklyn and an associate of Captain Clock's built himself another bungalow "a good many miles from the noise of everything but the surf."

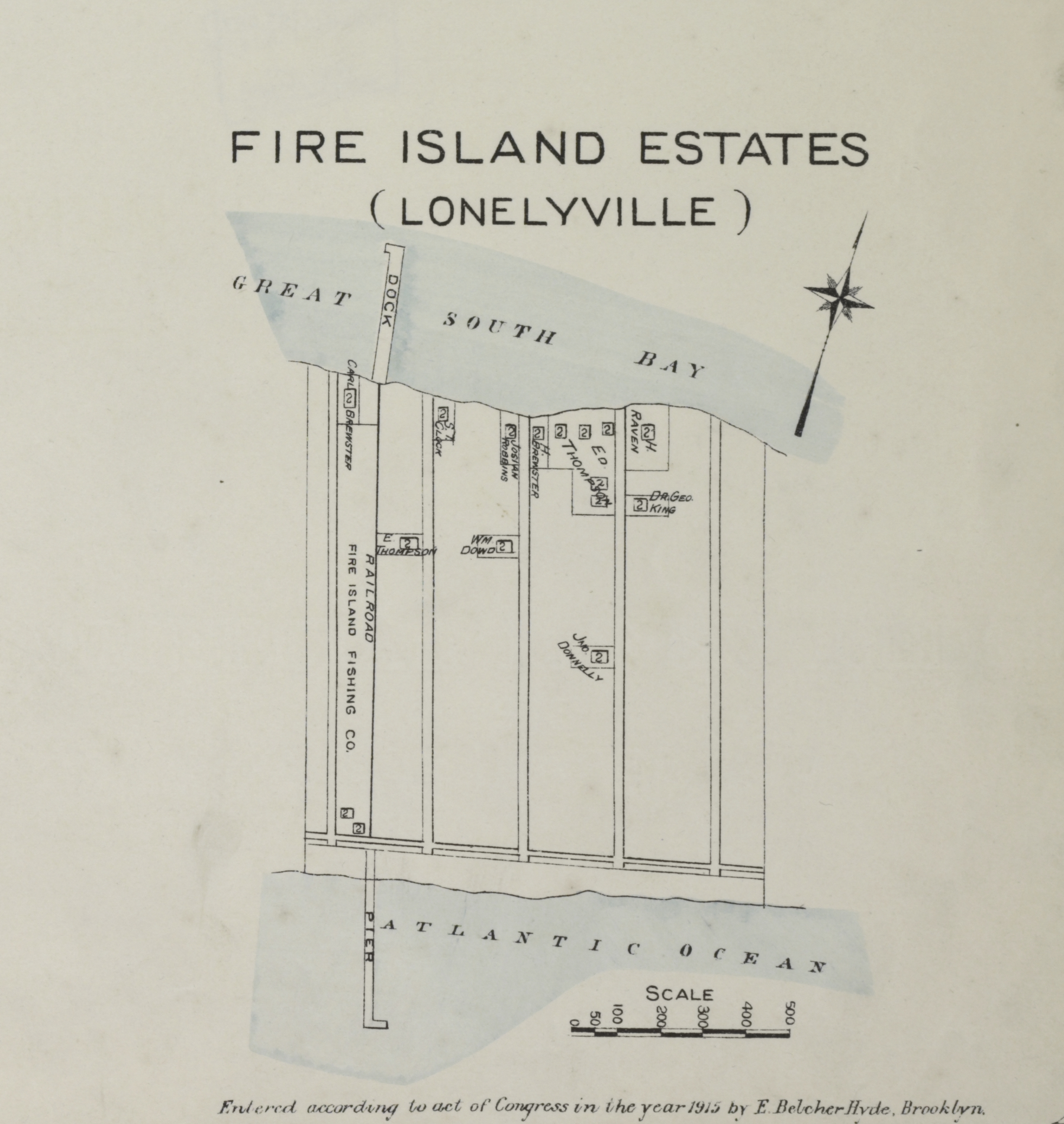
Fire Island Estates (Lonelyville), 1915

In June 1915 Captain Clock, along with Thompson, planned to build a 1000-foot pier into the ocean and establish the Fire Island Fishing Company there. The idea of the venture was to unload fish from commercial fishing boats, along with fish caught with the use of large fishing nets which were strung out some 1600 feet from the pier and reeled in daily. The catch would then be loaded onto a small railroad system and then run across the island to another pier extending 500 feet on the bayside. The fish would then be loaded into other boats and then sailed to the mainland. This avoided the long and tricky passage through Fire Island Inlet, thus saving countless travel hours for the fishermen. The pier remained standing long after Captain Clock's fishing company shut down and became somewhat of a landmark for that part of Fire Island. The Hurricane of 1938 finally took what remained of the slowly deteriorating pier.

In a 1915 map from the Hyde, E. Belcher, Map Company of Brooklyn, Lonelyville is also listed as "Fire Island Estates" and the pier appears to have been in place at that time as well as the railroad track for the Fire Island Fishing Company.

The 1938 New England hurricane completely demolished the pier leaving little except the bayside portion of the dock which stood until the 1950s. As recently as 2025, footings for the pier could be seen about 100 feet (30 m) offshore and submerged under 20 feet (6.1 m) of water.

== Notable people ==
- Mel Brooks – Actor, comedian, and producer.
- Anne Bancroft – Actress.

== See also ==
- Dunewood, New York
- Fair Harbor, New York
- Fire Island Pines, New York
- Kismet, New York
- Ocean Beach, New York
- Saltaire, New York

| Preceded by Ocean Beach | Beaches of Fire Island | Succeeded by Dunewood |
