= Corey Swinson =

American football player (1969–2013)

No. 64
- Position: Defensive tackle

Personal information
- Born: December 15, 1969; Bay Shore, New York, U.S.
- Died: September 10, 2013 (aged 43); Bay Shore, New York, U.S.
- Listed height: 6 ft 5 in (1.96 m)
- Listed weight: 334 lb (151 kg)

Career information
- High school: Bay Shore (NY)
- College: Hampton
- NFL draft: 1995: 7th round, 233rd overall pick

Career history
- Miami Dolphins (1995)*; St. Louis Rams (1995); San Francisco 49ers (1997)*
- * Offseason or practice squad member only

Corey J. Swinson (December 15, 1969 – September 10, 2013) was an American professional football defensive tackle. After playing his college football at Hampton University, Swinson spent one season with the NFL's St. Louis Rams in 1995. He was selected by the Miami Dolphins in the seventh round of the 1995 NFL draft, but only spent the preseason on their roster.

Returning to Long Island after his short NFL career, Swinson was a coach at his alma mater Bay Shore High School. A lifelong resident of Bay Shore, New York, Swinson died on September 10, 2013, of natural causes.
