= Ocean Beach, New York =

- Village
- Incorporated Village of Ocean Beach
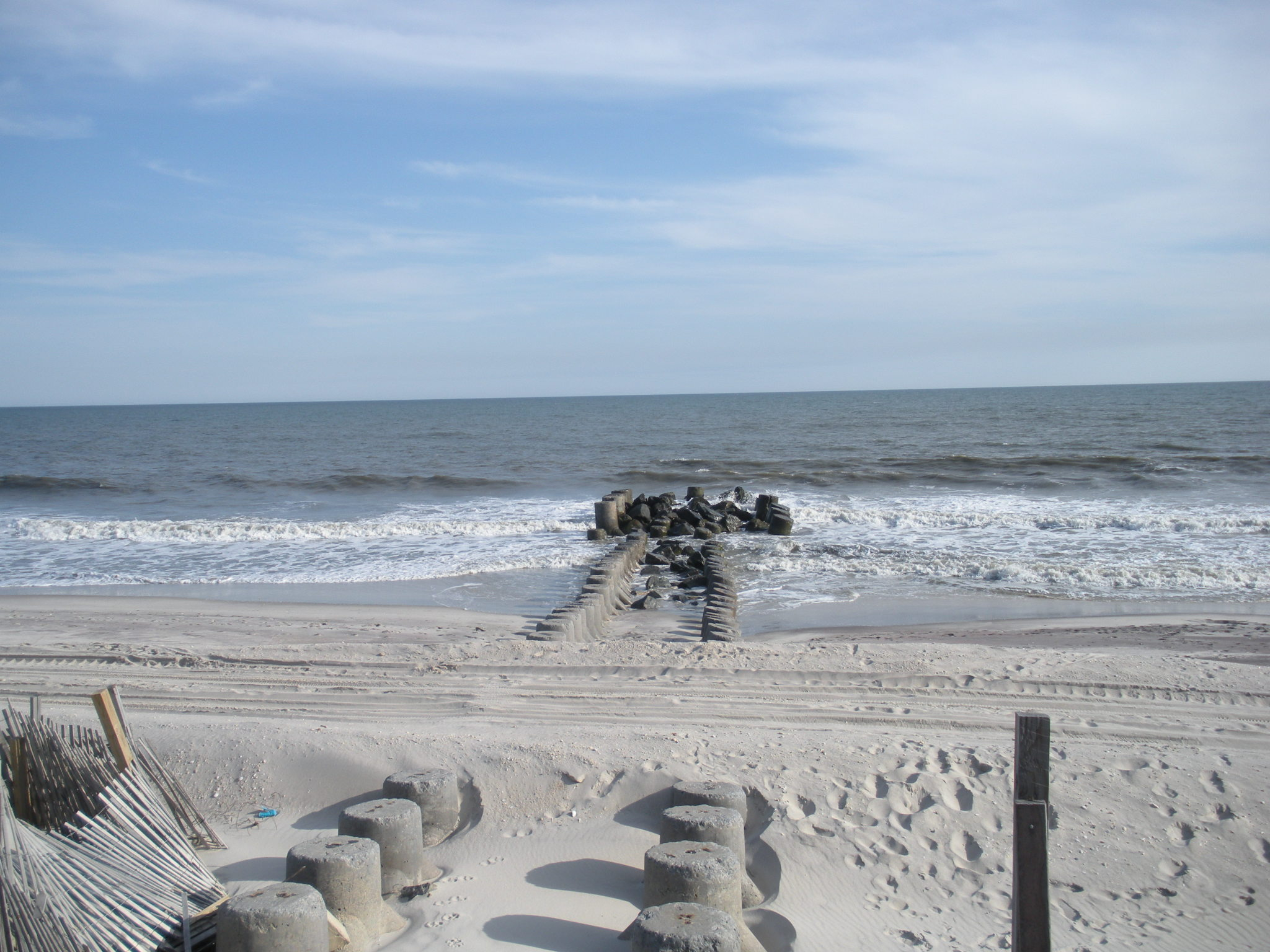
- Ocean Beach, within the eponymous village, in 2009

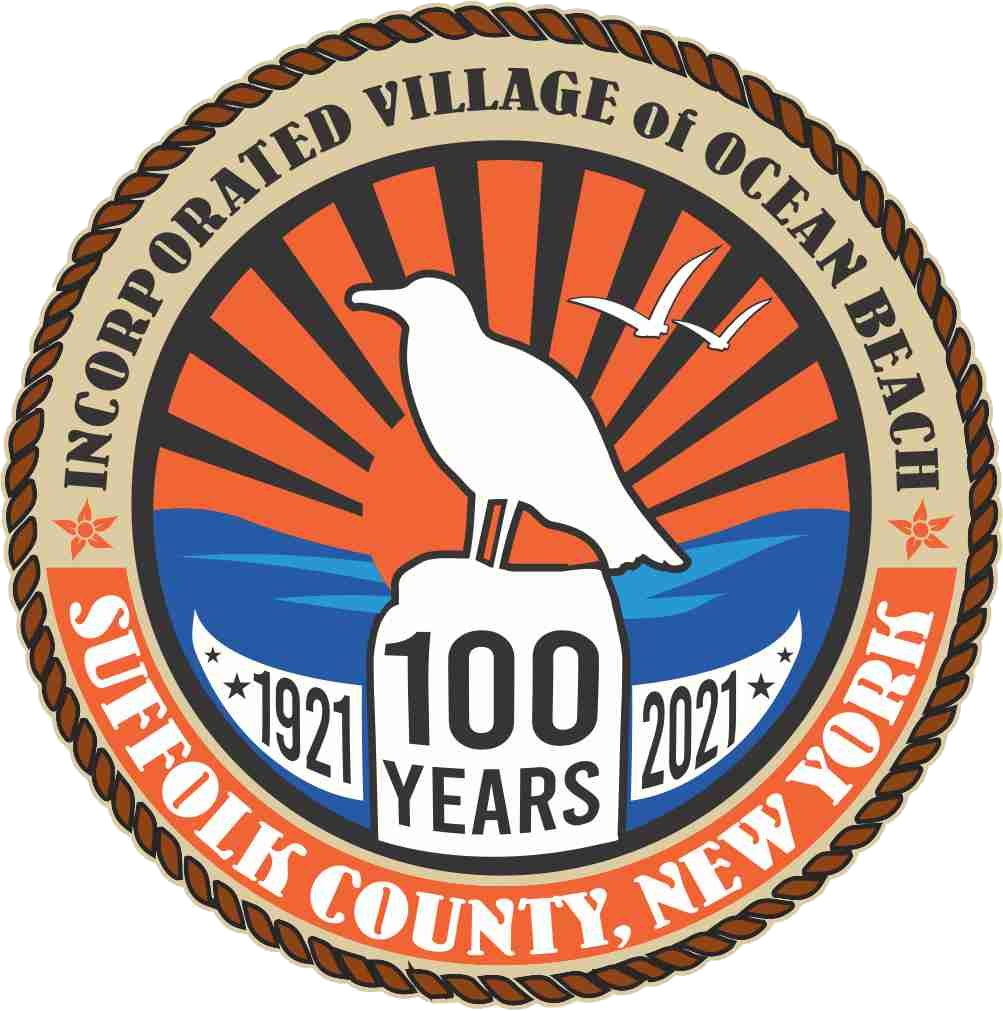
- Seal

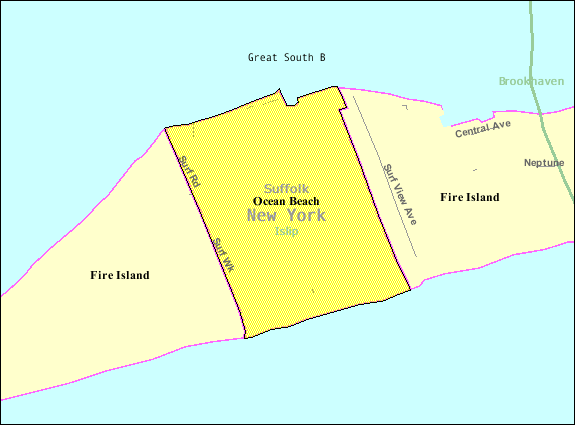
- U.S. Census map of Ocean Beach

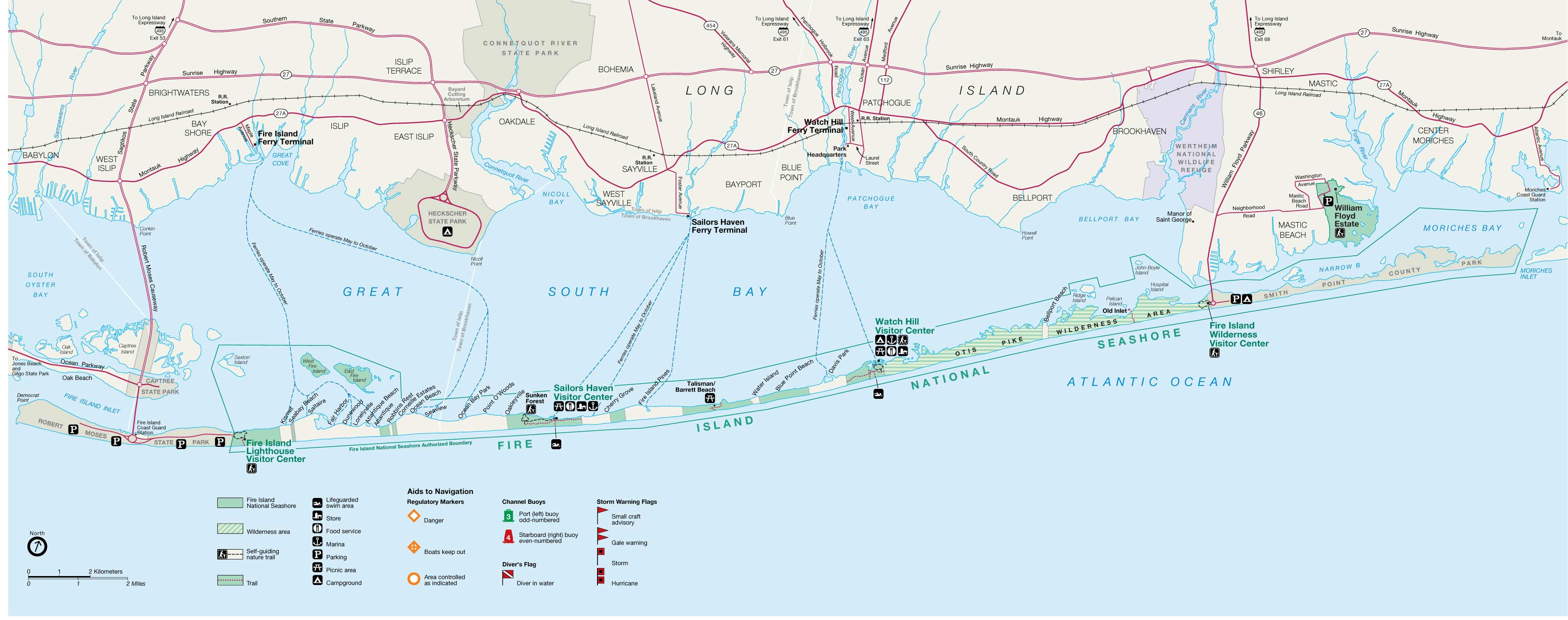
- Location on Fire Island Location within the state of New York
- Coordinates: 40°38′52″N 73°9′28″W
- Country: United States
- State: New York
- County: Suffolk
- Town: Islip
- Incorporated: 1921

Government
  - Mayor: James S. Mallott

Area
  - Total: 0.14 sq mi (0.37 km^{2})
  - Land: 0.14 sq mi (0.37 km^{2})
  - Water: 0 sq mi (0.00 km^{2})
- Elevation: 3.3 ft (1 m)

Population (2020)
  - Total: 153
  - Density: 1,080/sq mi (418/km^{2})
- Time zone: UTC-5 (Eastern (EST))
  - Summer (DST): UTC-4 (EDT)
- ZIP code: 11770
- Area codes: 631, 934
- FIPS code: 36-54430
- GNIS feature ID: 0959211
- Website: villageofoceanbeach.org

Ocean Beach is a village on Fire Island in the southern part of the Town of Islip, within Suffolk County, New York, United States. The population was 153 at the time of the 2020 census. Known for its strict local ordinances, the village is nicknamed "The Land of No."

The Incorporated Village of Ocean Beach is a popular tourist destination, due to its beachfront location accompanied by a commercial district featuring nightlife, hotels, waterfront restaurants, and a variety of stores.

== History ==
Ocean Beach was incorporated as a village in 1921. It formed with the merger between the tract of land owned by John A. Wilbur and Stay-A-While Estates. It is the location of Fire Island's only elementary school, which first opened in 1918.

The community was once a favorite of celebrities including Fanny Brice, Carl Reiner, and Mel Brooks.

When artistic bohème of New York started frequenting Fire Island during the Jazz Age, Ocean Beach became the first gay village of the island. This caused tensions between the gay (often famous) tourists and locals, which peaked when Antoine de Paris built on his land an outdoor toilet with revealing saloon door right across the street from a Catholic church. The villagers arranged a provocation by choosing a teenage boy to "seduce" one of Antoine's guests, and after catching the guest in flagranti, they burned down Antoine's property. After that and the Great Hurricane of 1938, the gay community settled in the Cherry Grove.

== Geography ==
According to the United States Census Bureau, the village has a total area of 0.1 square miles (0.26 km^{2}), all land.

The village is bordered to the north by the Great South Bay, and to the south by the Atlantic Ocean.

== Demographics ==
Historical population
Census	Pop.	Note	%±
1930	205		—
1940	81		−60.5%
1950	73		−9.9%
1960	111		52.1%
1970	109		−1.8%
1980	155		42.2%
1990	131		−15.5%
2000	138		5.3%
2010	79		−42.8%
2020	153		93.7%
U.S. Decennial Census

=== 2020 census ===
As of the 2020 census, there were 153 people residing in the village.

=== 2010 census ===
As of the 2010 census, there were 79 people residing in the village. The racial makeup of the village was 100% White, 0% African American, 0% Native American, 0% Asian, 0% from other races, and 0% from two or more races. Hispanic or Latino of any race were 1.27% of the population.

=== Census 2000 ===
As of the 2000 census there were 138 people, 61 households, and 35 families in the village. The population density was 967.1 inhabitants per square mile (373.4/km^{2}). There were 595 housing units at an average density of 4,169.6 per square mile (1,609.9/km^{2}). The racial makeup of the village was 96.38% White and 1.45% Asian. Hispanic or Latino of any race were 2.17%.

Of the 61 households 29.5% had children under the age of 18 living with them, 45.9% were married couples living together, 8.2% had a female householder with no husband present, and 42.6% were non-families. 29.5% of households were one person and 4.9% were one person aged 65 or older. The average household size was 2.26 and the average family size was 2.91.

The age distribution was 21.7% under the age of 18, 5.1% from 18 to 24, 32.6% from 25 to 44, 31.2% from 45 to 64, and 9.4% 65 or older. The median age was 42 years. For every 100 females, there were 126.2 males. For every 100 females age 18 and over, there were 120.4 males.

The median household income was $48,125 and the median family income was $49,375. Males had a median income of $41,719 versus $28,750 for females. The per capita income for the village was $28,782. There were 15.2% of families and 11.5% of the population living below the poverty line, including 21.6% of under eighteens and none of those over 64.

== Government ==
The Village of Ocean Beach is governed by a five-member board, known as the Village of Ocean beach Board of Trustees. It consists of an elected mayor and four elected village trustees.

As of June 2023, the Mayor of Ocean Beach is James S. Mallott, and the Village Trustees are Marco Arment, Dawn L. Hargraves, Ian Levine, and Jennifer Moritz.

The village is known for its strict local ordinances and is nicknamed "The Land of No".

== Life in Ocean Beach ==
Ocean Beach is well-known to be a center for commercial amenities such as restaurants and shops. It is considered to be a versatile community for various types of summer tourists including families.

The website fireisland.com labels Ocean Beach the "unofficial capital of Fire Island." The website Fire Island Finder states: "[As] the largest village on Fire Island, Ocean Beach is at the heart of the island. With more shops, restaurants, hotels, inns, nightlife and services, OB is wildly popular. Residents and families mingle happily with Day-Trippers who ferry over to enjoy the beach, have dinner on the bay at sunset and go dancing in the bars. Explore this lively town and its businesses.

== Education ==
=== School district ===
The Fire Island Union Free School District, which covers the village, operates the Woodhull School (K-6) within Ocean Beach. Students who graduate from the Woodhull School can choose to attend either the Bay Shore Union Free School District or the Islip Union Free School District for their secondary education. The respective high schools are Bay Shore High School and Islip High School.

=== Library district ===
Ocean Beach is located within the boundaries of Fire Island's library district.

== Infrastructure ==
=== Transportation ===
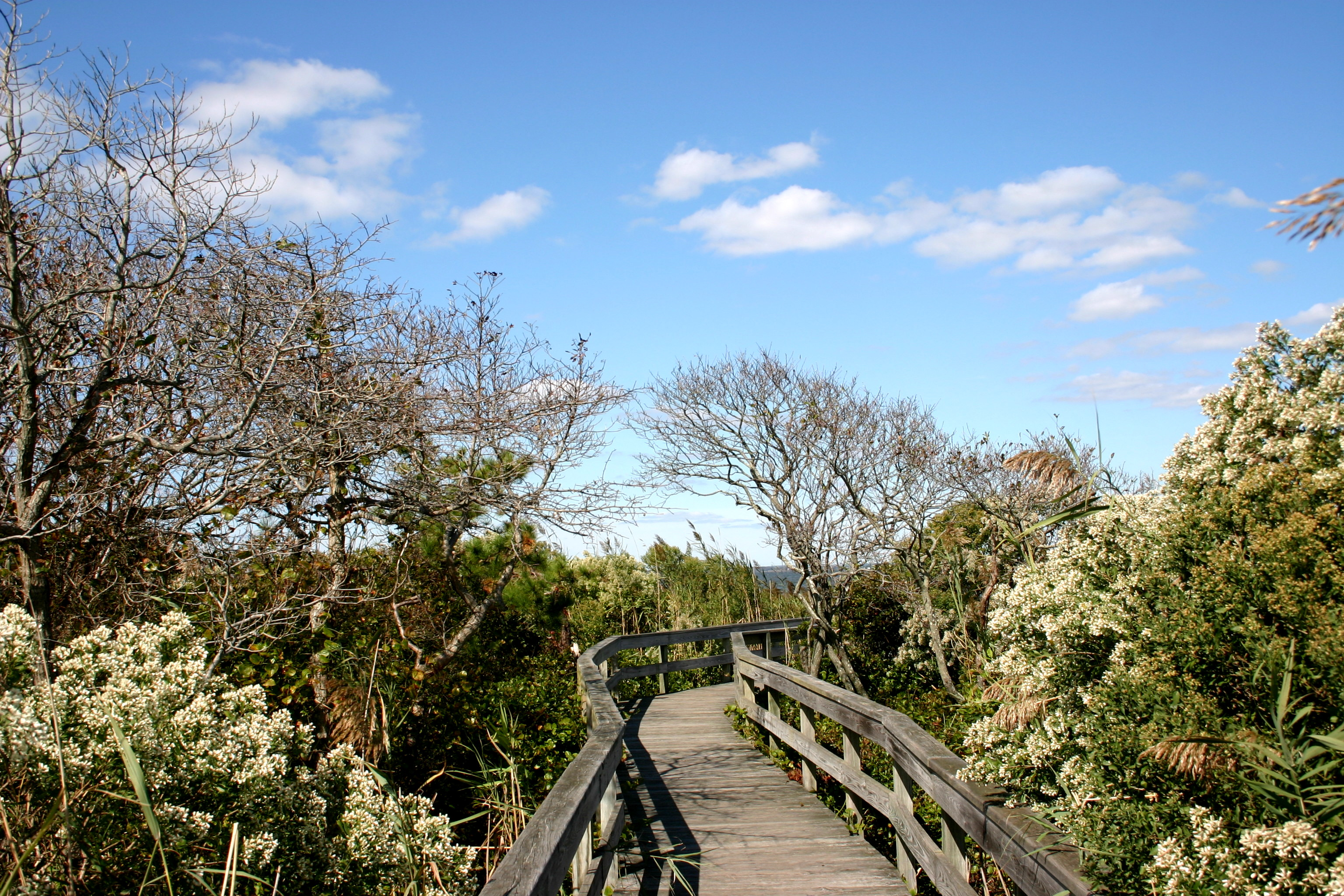
A boardwalk in Ocean Beach in 2006

There are four methods to travel to/from Ocean Beach and throughout Fire Island: travel by car (restricted by permit obtainable via Fire Island National Seashore), ride the Fire Island Ferries, take a water taxi, or arrive by private boat.

It is also possible to reach Ocean Beach by foot or bicycle from other Fire Island communities by one of the inland walks or via the beach.

=== Utilities ===
PSEG Long Island provides power to all homes and businesses within Saltaire, on behalf of the Long Island Power Authority.

The Suffolk County Water Authority provides the village with its water and operates the area's water supply system.

Ocean Beach is served by the Ocean Beach Sewer District.

=== Emergency services ===
Fire protection within the village is provided by the Ocean Beach Fire District.

Police protection within Ocean Beach is provided by the Ocean Beach Police Department.

== Notable people ==
- Brett King – actor
- Keegan-Michael Key – American actor, comedian, screenwriter, and producer

== See also ==
- List of municipalities in New York
- Fire Island Pines, New York
- Kismet, New York
- Saltaire, New York

Preceded by Ocean Bay Park	Beaches of Fire Island	Succeeded by Lonelyville
