= Saltaire, New York =

- Village
- Incorporated Village of Saltaire
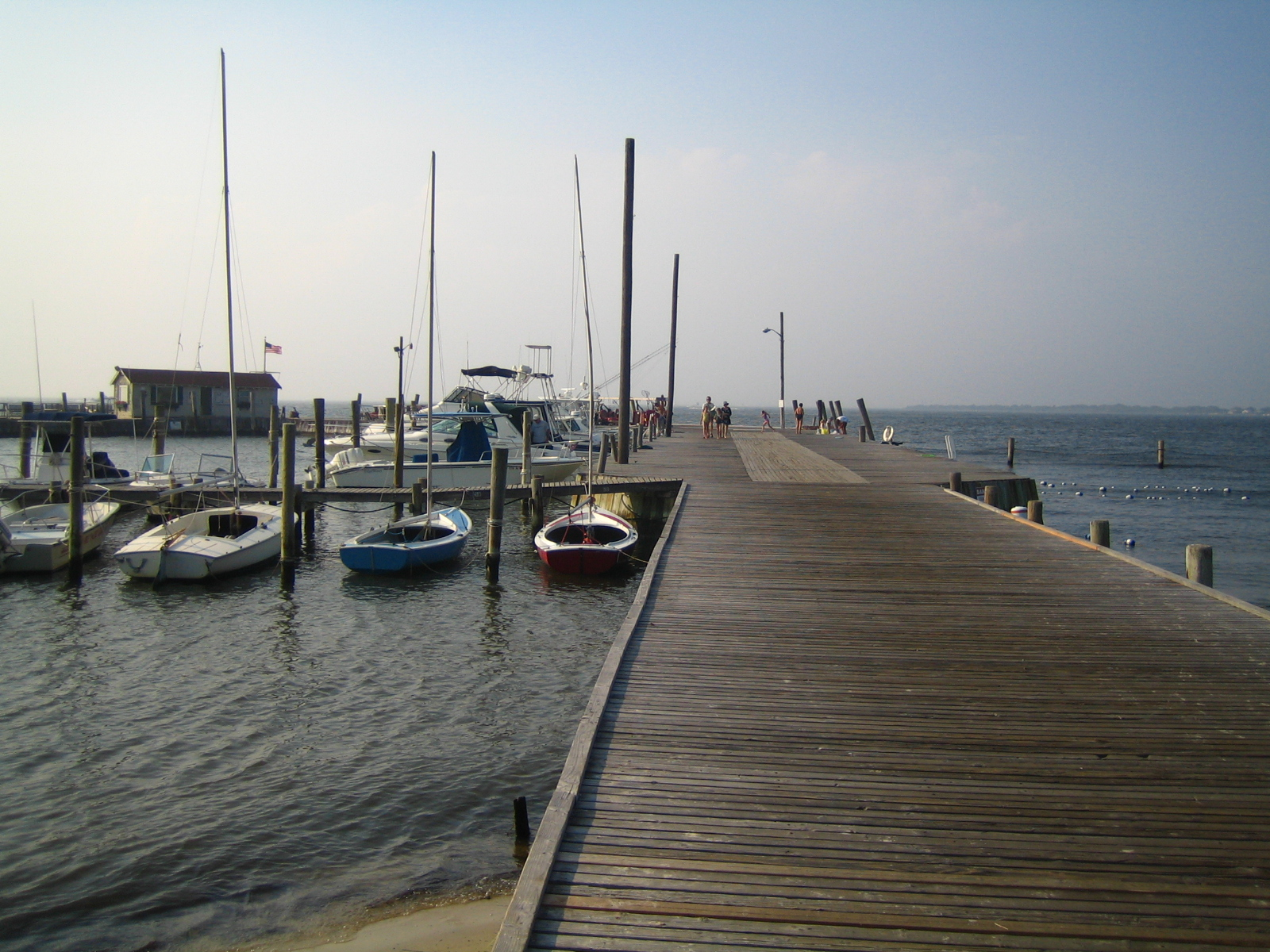
- Dock at Saltaire

- Location in Suffolk County and the state of New York

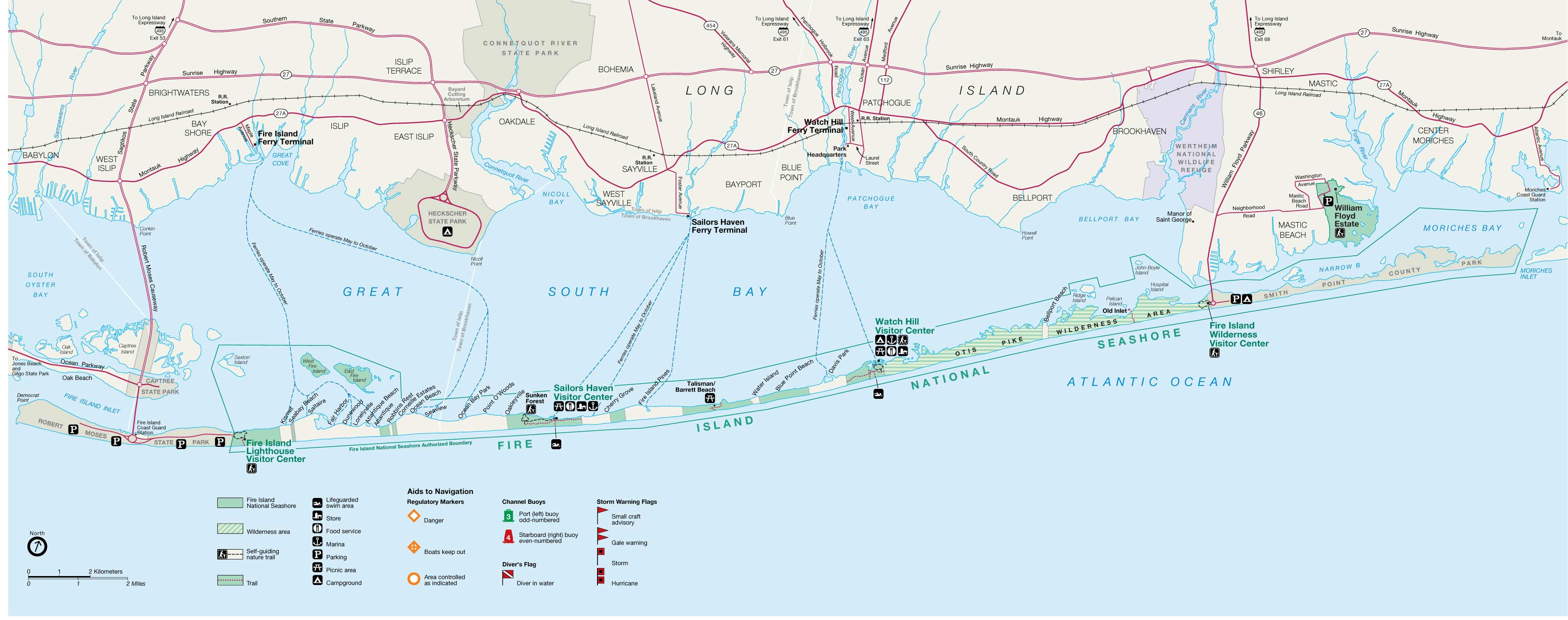
- Location on Fire Island Location within the state of New York
- Coordinates: 40°38′15″N 73°11′48″W
- Country: United States
- State: New York
- County: Suffolk
- Town: Islip
- First settled: 1910
- Incorporated: 1917

Government
  - Mayor: Hugh O'Brien

Area
  - Total: 0.29 sq mi (0.74 km^{2})
  - Land: 0.23 sq mi (0.60 km^{2})
  - Water: 0.050 sq mi (0.13 km^{2})
- Elevation: 3.3 ft (1 m)

Population (2020)
  - Total: 113
  - Density: 485.4/sq mi (187.43/km^{2})
- Time zone: UTC-5 (Eastern (EST))
  - Summer (DST): UTC-4 (EDT)
- ZIP code: 11706
- Area codes: 631, 934
- FIPS code: 36-64881
- GNIS feature ID: 0964335
- Website: www.saltaire.org

Saltaire is a village on Fire Island in the Town of Islip, in Suffolk County, New York, United States. The year-round population was 113 at the time of the 2020 census, although the population of the village – being a summer beach community – increases many times over in the summer.

== History ==
Saltaire was founded in 1910 as a beach colony taking advantage of its location sandwiched between the Great South Bay to the north and the Atlantic Ocean to the south. Work on constructing the community commenced the following year, and the first residents had moved in by 1912.

In 1917, as the community was growing, the residents of Saltaire incorporated their community as a village. It was the first village to incorporate on Fire Island, with nearby Ocean Beach incorporating a few years later, in 1921. At the time, there were 25 legal residents in the village – none of whom lived there in the wintertime, making it at the time the smallest village by population in Nassau and Suffolk counties and likely statewide, per reports from The Brooklyn Daily Eagle.

In 1937, electricity arrived in the village, with the completion of new electrical infrastructure connecting it with the existing power grid on Long Island, across the Great South Bay.

In 1938, the Long Island Express hurricane caused heavy damage to property and infrastructure within Saltaire, and six village residents were killed. Recovery efforts would soon thereafter commence. The total number of houses within the village had returned to pre-1938 levels by the 1970s.

Private telephone service was introduced in the village, with the installation of new telecommunications infrastructure.

In early 2009, a beach restoration project was executed within the village.

The village sustained damage from Hurricane Sandy in 2012. Recovery efforts quickly commenced, with major improvements being achieved by the latter half of the decade.

In 2017, the village celebrated its centennial.

== Geography ==
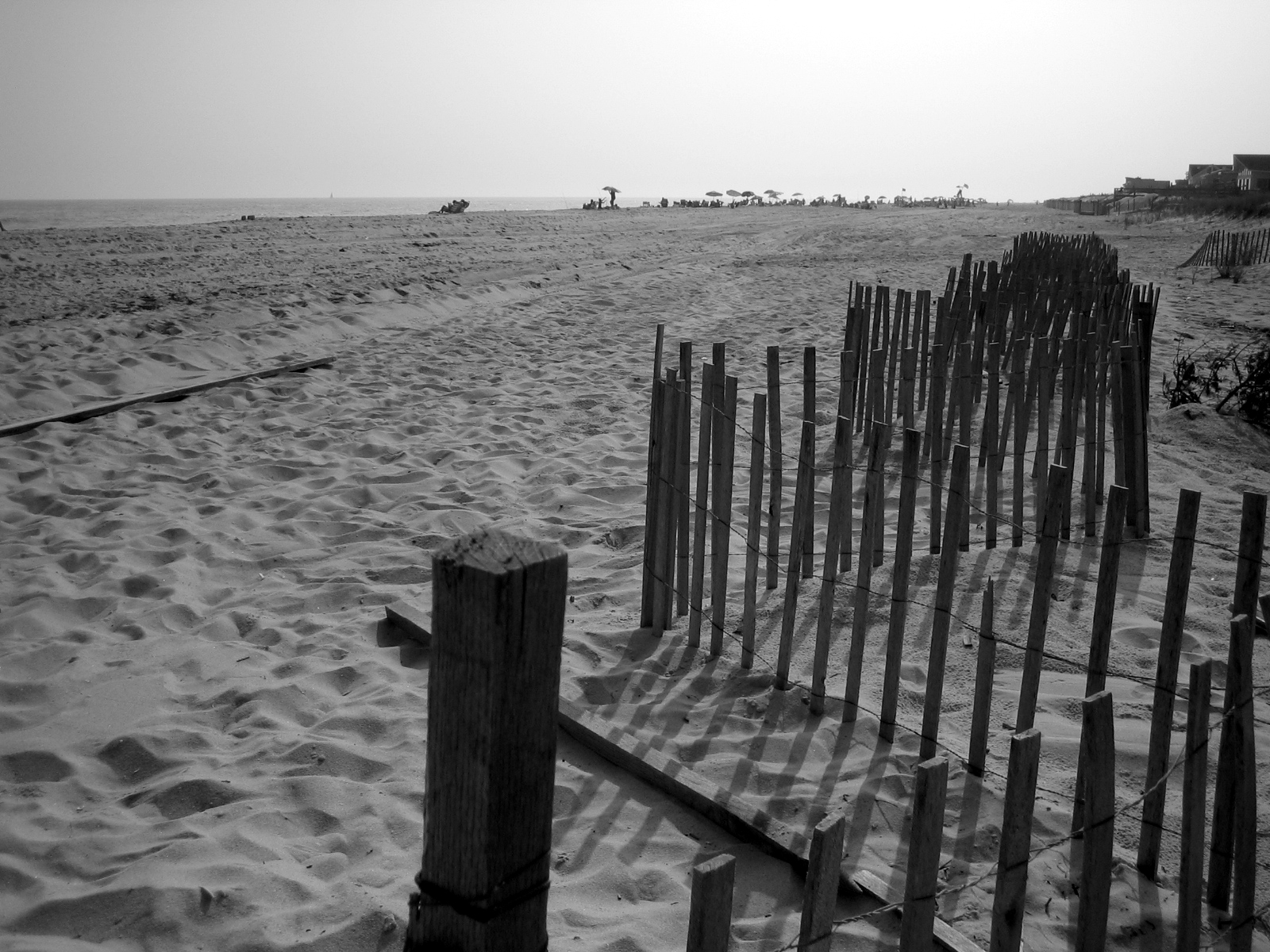
Saltaire Beach

According to the United States Census Bureau, the village has an area of 0.27 square miles (0.7 km^{2}), of which 0.23 square miles (0.6 km^{2}) is land and 0.04 square miles (0.1 km^{2}), or 18.04%, is water. Among other things, Saltaire is known for its softball league in the summer. The village encompasses the widest portion of Fire Island, at approximately 0.5 miles (0.80 km).

Saltaire can be reached by the Fire Island Ferries, by private boat, by walking, or by car. Fire Island Ferry service to Saltaire leaves from the Fire Island ferry terminal in Bay Shore, New York.

The village is on the western part of Fire Island between the Great South Bay and the Atlantic Ocean and between the hamlets of Kismet (to the west) and Fair Harbor (to the east).

There are 459 housing units in the community, as well as a Village Hall and Court, general market, fire house, two churches, and a members' yacht club.

Saltaire is the second-largest Fire Island community, and is on the widest part of the island.

== Demographics ==
Historical population
Census	Pop.	Note	%±
1920	12		—
1930	64		433.3%
1940	22		−65.6%
1950	21		−4.5%
1960	28		33.3%
1970	37		32.1%
1980	35		−5.4%
1990	38		8.6%
2000	43		13.2%
2010	37		−14.0%
2020	113		205.4%
U.S. Decennial Census

The following demographics represent year-round Saltaire households (not representative of total ownership or summer population):

As of the census of 2000, there were 43 people, 14 households, and 9 families residing in the village. The population density was 155.0 inhabitants per square mile (59.8/km^{2}). There were 401 housing units at an average density of 1,445.2 per square mile (558.0/km^{2}). The racial makeup of the village was 79.07% White, 9.30% Asian, and 11.63% from two or more races. Hispanic or Latino of any race were 2.33% of the population.

There were 14 households, out of which 35.7% had children under the age of 18 living with them, 57.1% were married couples living together, and 28.6% were non-families. 14.3% of all households were made up of individuals, and 14.3% had someone living alone who was 65 years of age or older. The average household size was 3.07, and the average family size was 3.50.

In the village, the population was spread out, with 37.2% under the age of 18, 25.6% from 25 to 44, 16.3% from 45 to 64, and 20.9% who were 65 years of age or older. The median age was 36 years. For every 100 females, there were 152.9 males. For every 100 females age 18 and over, there were 107.7 males.

The median income for a household in the village was $75,252, and the median income for a family was $49,500. Males had a median income of $51,250 versus $41,250 for females. The per capita income for the village was $17,125. None of the population and none of the families were below the poverty line.

== Parks and recreation ==
The Saltaire Yacht Club was founded in 1911. All property owners and renters in the village are eligible to join.

Saltaire features a beach located along the Atlantic Ocean.

== Government ==
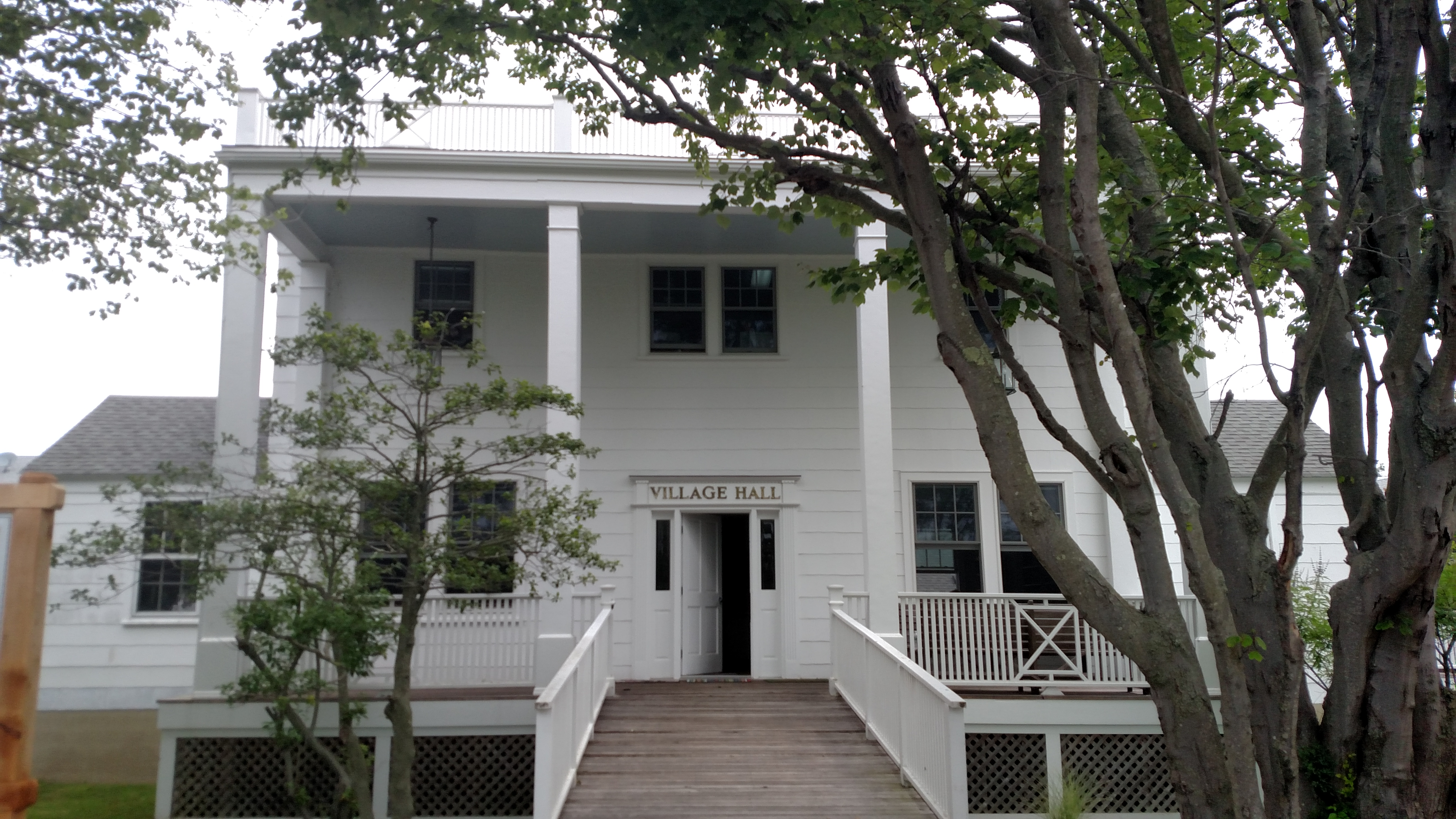
Saltaire Village Hall in 2015

The village is governed by the five-member Village of Saltaire Board of Trustees, which consists of a Mayor and four Board of Trustees. All five positions are elected positions.

As of June 2026, the Mayor of Saltaire is Hugh O'Brien.

=== Politics ===
In the 2024 U.S. presidential election, the majority of Saltaire voters voted for Kamala D. Harris (D).

== Education ==
=== Schools ===
Children of year-round residents are zoned to Fire Island School District. Accordingly, children in the village who attend public schools attend the sole school of the district – Woodhull School in Ocean Beach – until grade 6, at which point they are bussed to Long Island for grades 7-12, with a choice of either the Bay Shore School District (which operates Bay Shore Middle School and Bay Shore High School) or to the Islip School District (which operates Islip High School).

=== Library district ===
The village is located within the boundaries of the Fire Island Library District.

== Infrastructure ==
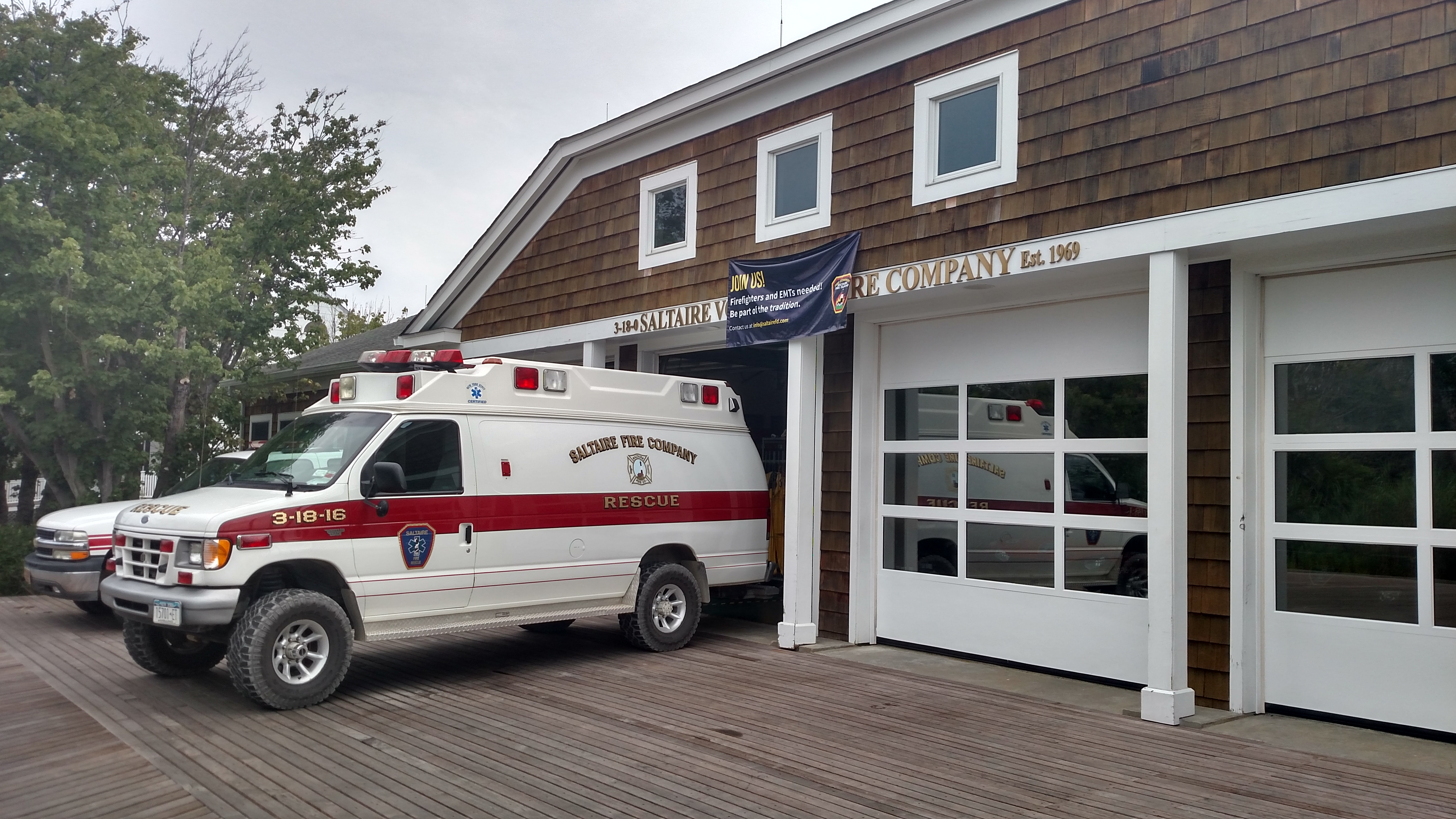
The Saltaire Volunteer Fire Company in 2015

=== Transportation ===
Passenger ferry service links Saltaire with the Long Island community of Bay Shore, on the opposite side of the Great South Bay. This passenger ferry service is operated as part of Fire Island Ferries' network.

=== Utilities ===
PSEG Long Island provides power to all homes and businesses within Saltaire, on behalf of the Long Island Power Authority.

The Suffolk County Water Authority provides the village with its water and operates the area's water supply system.

=== Emergency services ===
The Saltaire Volunteer Fire Company was established in 1969 to provide fire suppression services to the village. In 1986, the fire company became the first Fire Island fire department to provide Emergency Medical Services to the village and surrounding communities.

== See also ==
- List of Municipalities in New York
- Fire Island Pines, New York
- Kismet, New York
- Ocean Beach, New York

Preceded by Fair Harbor	Beaches of Fire Island	Succeeded by Kismet
