= Fire Island School District =

School district in New York

Location
- Fire Island, New York, 11770; United States

District information
- Type: Public
- Grades: PK–6
- NCES District ID: 3621540

Students and staff
- Students: 47
- Teachers: 7.1
- Staff: 21.0
- Student–teacher ratio: 6.62

Other information
- Website: www.fi.k12.ny.us

Fire Island Union Free School District No. 14 is a school district headquartered in the Town of Islip and on Fire Island, in New York. The school is adjacent to but not in Ocean Beach.

The district includes, portions of Fire Island west of Ocean Beach Estates. This means, in addition to Ocean Beach: Saltaire, Fire Island Beach, Great South Beach, Kismet Park, and Point-O'-Woods. The district includes areas in the towns of Babylon, Brookhaven, and Islip.

It includes Woodhull School, grades Kindergarten to Six. It is named after Richard Woodhull, a principal and teacher in the period 1935 to 1962. Within the community it is known as the "Fire Island School".

Students who graduate from Woodhull can choose to go to either the Bay Shore School District or the Islip School District for secondary levels. The respective high schools are Bay Shore High School and Islip High School.

== History ==
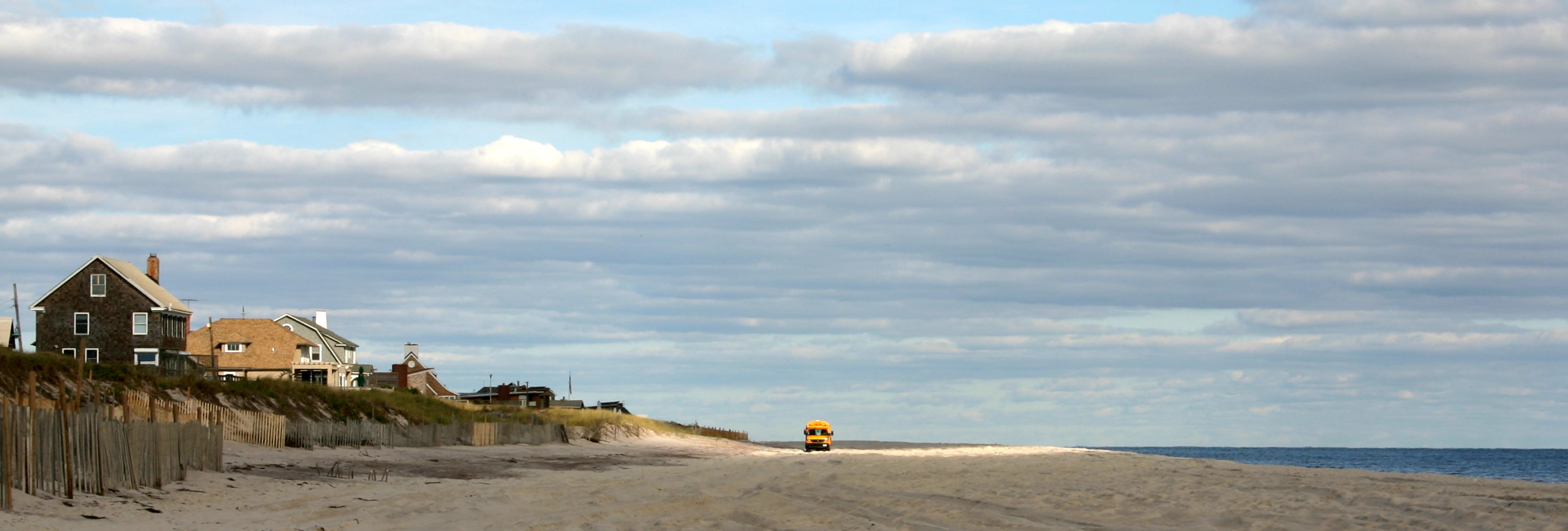
A school bus on the sands of Fire Island

Mina A. Woodhull, the mother of the namesake of the school, opened the first school of the district in 1918 in a private residence rented by Fire Island UFSD. The district itself was designated on November 18, 1902 with a re-designation on July 24, 1916. In 1925 a permanent one room school facility opened. At one time the district had a separate school in Kismet Park. It was consolidated into a single Ocean Beach school that opened in 1954. Woodhull received its name in 1978.

Wendell Chu became the superintendent of the district in 2001 and served as such until 2008, when he became superintendent of the East Islip School District.

In 2009, a study was conducted on whether to consolidate the school, and the advice was to not do so as property taxes would significantly increase. Due to a reduced enrollment, in 2011 the school began allowing people not living in the district to enroll their children. It charges an annual tuition of $3,000.

As of 2017 the community maintained course by keeping its school.

== Campus ==
The school has a combined gymnasium and auditorium with a maximum capacity of 403. It was established in 1975.

== Demographics ==
In 1992, the school had 47 students, with nine residing on U.S. Coast Guard property and three living on the Fire Island Lighthouse and Sailor's Haven U.S. park ranger properties. Circa 2001 the district had 61 students. In 2011 enrollment was down to 19.

In 1992, most teachers did not live in the district territory and so took the district school buses to commute back and forth.

== Transport ==
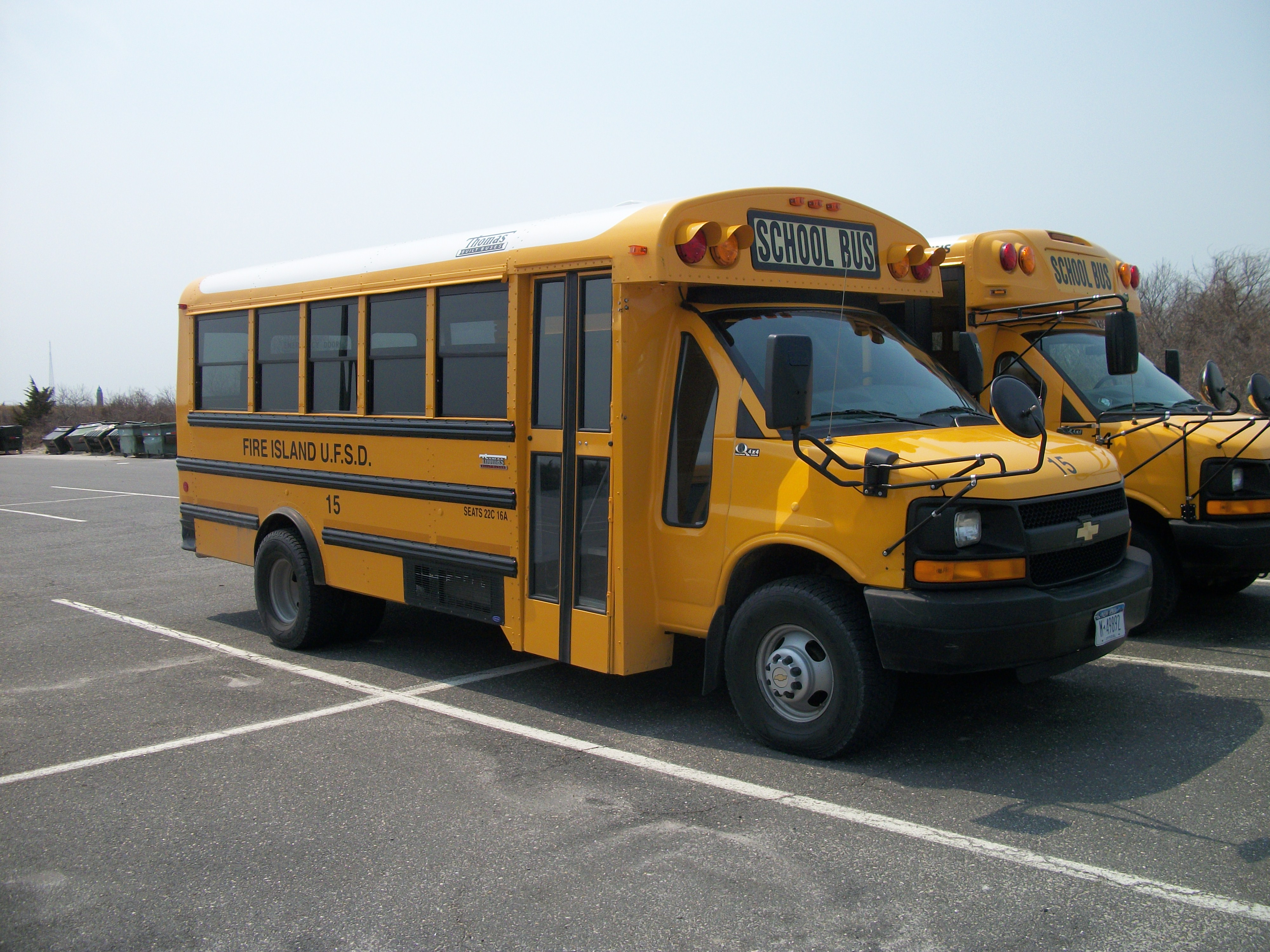
Fire Island UFSD school bus

As Fire Island lacks paved roads, the district uses four wheel drive buses.

== Culture ==
In 1992, Diane Ketcham of The New York Times stated that due to a lack of entertainment in winter periods and lack of television channels, "Fire Island children love to go to school." The school through its after school activities functions as a community center for area children.

== See also ==
- Non-high school district
