= Kismet, New York =

Kismet
- Hamlet
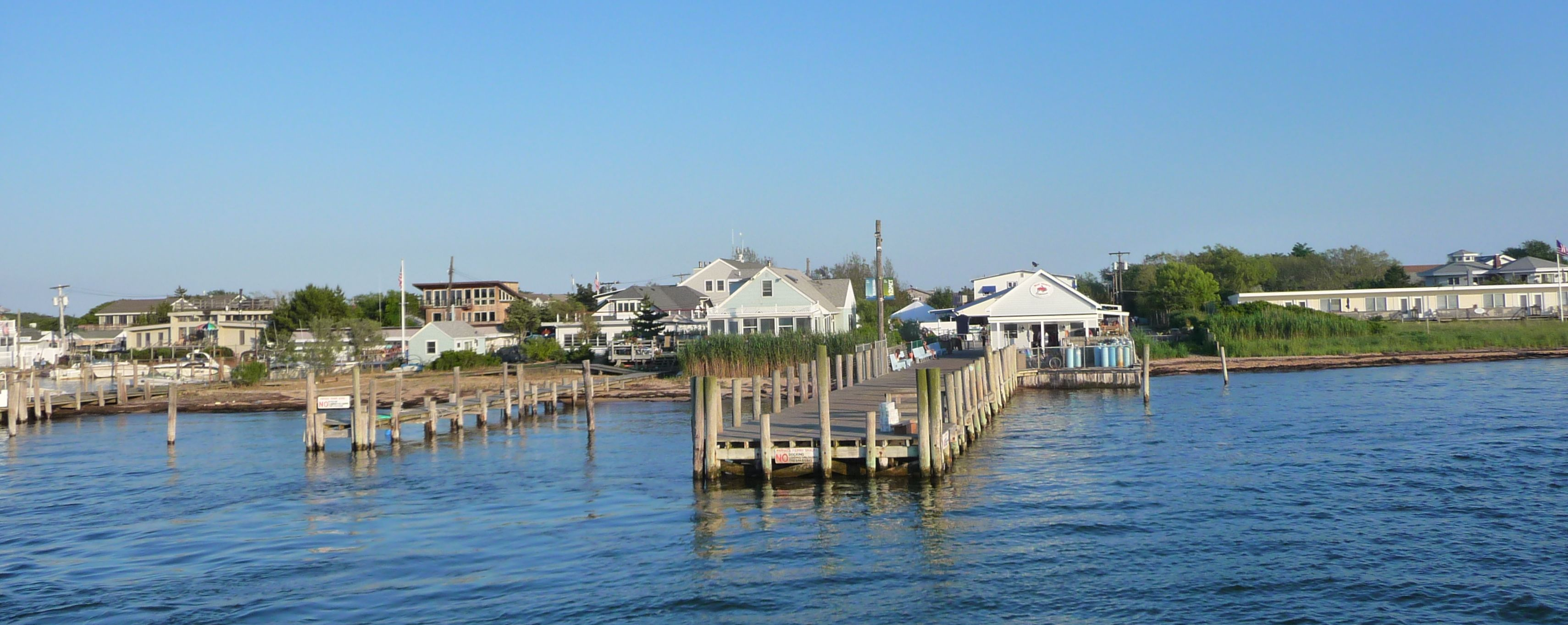
- Kismet, as seen from the Fire Island Ferry in the summertime

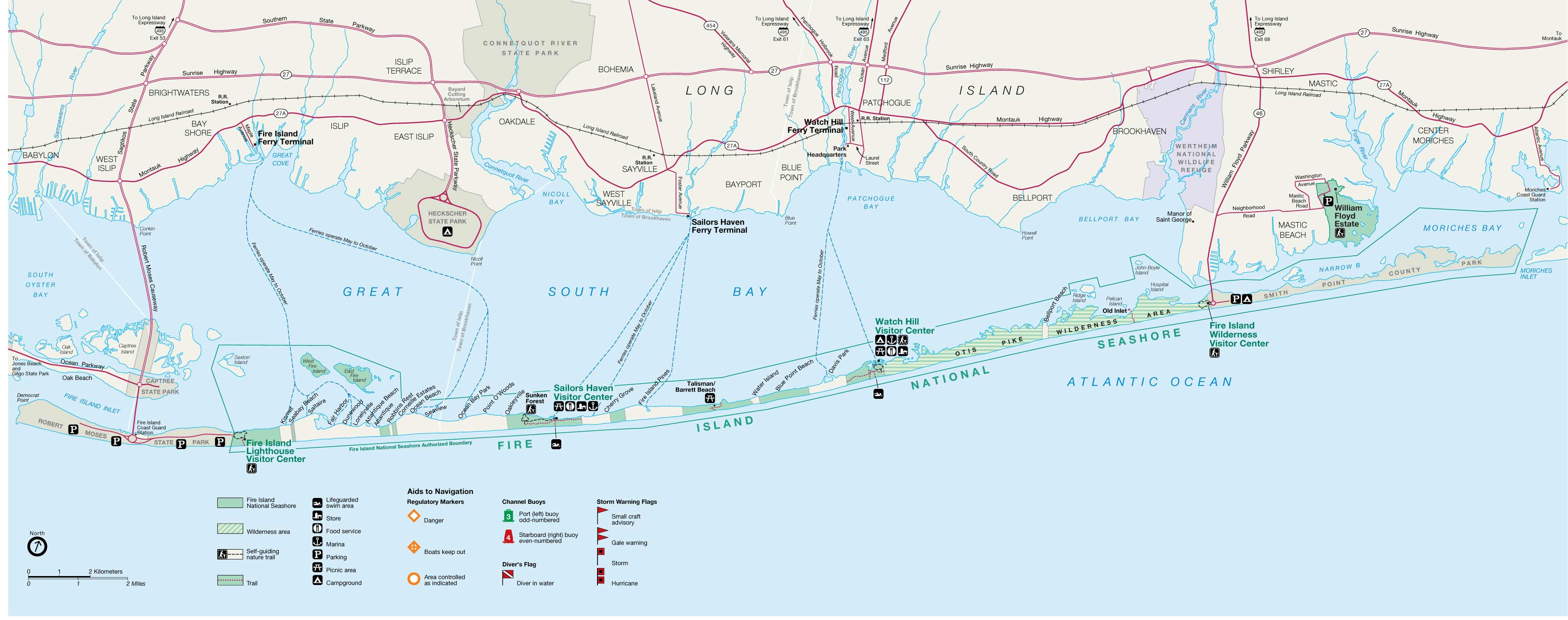
- Location on Fire Island Location within the state of New York
- Coordinates: 40°38′03″N 73°12′12″W
- Country: United States
- State: New York
- County: Suffolk
- Township: Islip
- Elevation: 3 ft (0.91 m)
- Time zone: UTC-5 (EST)
  - Summer (DST): UTC-4 (EDT)
- ZIP code: 11706
- Area codes: 631, 934
- GNIS feature ID: 954725

Kismet is a hamlet in the Town of Islip, in Suffolk County, New York, United States. It is the westernmost beach community on Fire Island, immediately west of Saltaire and east of the Fire Island Lighthouse. Kismet is accessible by road or on foot via Robert Moses State Park to the west, or by ferry from Bay Shore on Long Island.

Facilities in Kismet include a marina, a few stores (the Kismet Market, Beach & Vine Wines & Spirits and the Red Wagon Emporium), Margarita Villas LLC Vacation Rentals, and three restaurants, Fire Island Tap (located at Margarita Villas), the Kismet Inn, and Dive (formerly The Out).

== Education ==
Residents are zoned to the Fire Island School District. Students attend the Woodhull School (PK-6), and then may choose either Bay Shore School District or Islip School District for secondary education. Their respective high schools are Bay Shore High School and Islip High School.

Preceded by Saltaire	Beaches of Fire Island	Succeeded by Robert Moses State Park
