= Ocean Bay Park, New York =

Ocean Bay Park
- Hamlet
- Location within the state of New York
- Coordinates: 40°40′59″N 73°0′18″W
- Country: United States
- State: New York
- County: Suffolk
- Town: Brookhaven
- Time zone: UTC−05:00 (Eastern Time Zone)
  - Summer (DST): UTC−04:00
- ZIP Codes: 11770
- Area codes: 631, 934

Ocean Bay Park is a hamlet in the town of Brookhaven in Suffolk County, New York, United States. It is located on Fire Island, a barrier island separated from the southern side of Long Island by the Great South Bay. To reach Ocean Bay Park, one must take a ferry or water taxi from Bay Shore.

Housing includes group houses and family homes. Nightlife and full-service restaurants include Flynn's (which also has a 50-boat marina) and the Schooner Inn.

Ocean Bay Park's population, once largely college-age and recent graduates, has since shifted towards families and older, long-term homeowners.

The residents of Ocean Bay Park have a history of being on the forefront of social change. On September 2, 1967 Dr. Martin Luther King was the guest of honor at a cocktail party held by Mr. and Mrs. Hyman Abbott as a fundraiser for his work. Earlier that day, Dr. King "spoke about community, the war in Vietnam, anti-Semitism and the need for a third political party." Fifteen hundred residents attended that rally in Seaview.

Preceded by Point O' Woods	Beaches of Fire Island	Succeeded by Ocean Beach
