= Bay Shore High School =

Location
- 155 Third Avenue; Bay Shore, New York; United States; 40°43′54″N 73°15′16″W

Information
- Type: Public
- Motto: The Future Begins Here
- Established: 1893 (133 years ago)
- School district: Bay Shore Schools
- NCES School ID: 360408000166
- Principal: Stephen Gordon
- Teaching staff: 169.54 (on FTE basis)
- Grades: 9–12
- Enrollment: 1,893 (2023–2024)
- Student to teacher ratio: 11.17
- Colors: Maroon and white
- Mascot: Marauder
- Website: http://bayshore.k12.ny.us

Bay Shore High School is a public high school located in Bay Shore, New York. The school has about 2,000 students in grades 9 to 12. It is a part of Bay Shore Schools and an International Baccalaureate school.

Graduates of Woodhull School (PK-6) of the Fire Island School District can attend Bay Shore secondary schools, including Bay Shore High School.

== Curriculum ==
Bay Shore High School, which follows the New York State Syllabus, offers courses in the following areas: English, Cultural Arts, Mathematics and Computer Technology, Occupational Education, World Languages (Latin, Spanish, Mandarin Chinese and French), Science and Social Studies. Additionally, the high school offers an Honors Program, Humanities Program, Math/Science/Technology/Career Program, Advanced Placement Courses, a Law sequence (7 courses), and Project Adventure (a physical education program that builds teamwork and trust.) Bay Shore High School began offering the International Baccalaureate Diploma Program in 2009.

== Sports ==
=== Softball ===
Bay Shore softball won a record seven New York State championships in 1994, 1995, 1997, 1998, 2000, 2005 and 2010. In this time, the team also won a record 13 Suffolk County championships, a record 10 Long Island championships, and 25 League titles. From 1994-1996, the Marauders won a Long Island record 56 games in a row including two undefeated New York State championships in 1994 and 1995. These teams were crowned Team of the Decade by Newsday. Bay Shore has won two Suffolk County championships since 2011.

=== Wrestling ===
Bay Shore Wrestling is the oldest team in public school wrestling team in Suffolk County, founded in 1932. As of 2020, Bay Shore Wrestling has a record of 733-436-14 in dual meets, along with 82 Suffolk County champion wrestlers, 23 Long Island champions, and 4 New York State champions. In 1981 and 1982, the Marauders won back to back Suffolk titles, including a dominant performance in 1981, setting the points, In 2020, Bay Shore set up the first NYSPHAA official girls' wrestling team, with athletes from across Suffolk County.

=== Esports ===
Bay Shore Esports has participated in games such as Call Of Duty, Overwatch, Rainbow Six: Siege, and Counter-Strike:Global Offensive, and also has had an ESPN article written about them in 2018. They won at a Microsoft Empower Possibility event; at this event, a short documentary was filmed about the team.

=== Other achievements ===
Boys’ Golf went undefeated in 2010.

In 2022, Boys' Cross Country won division championships.

Basketball won Suffolk County championships in 2004 and 2024 and the Long Island championship in 2024. They have also won four other Long Island Championships, including one in 1981.

== Notable alumni ==
- Harvey Milk, human rights activist, elected supervisor of District 5 of the City and County of San Francisco
- Brian Ehlers, former professional basketball player
- Judith Regan, publisher
- Robert Metcalfe, an electrical engineer who co-invented Ethernet, founded 3Com and formulated Metcalfe's Law.
- Corey Swinson, St. Louis Rams defensive tackle
- Amy Goodman, broadcast journalist, investigative reporter
- Jasmyne Spencer, soccer player
- Ryan Cassata, singer-songwriter, American activist, public speaker
- Duncan L. Niederauer, businessman
- Greg Weissert, professional baseball pitcher
- Kingdon Van Nostrand, tennis player and coach
- Ann Flood, actress (born Maryanne Elizabeth Ott)
