= Bay Shore Schools =

School district in the U.S. state of New York

Location
- Bay Shore, Suffolk County, New York; United States

District information
- Grades: K–12
- Established: 1893
- Superintendent: Steven J. Maloney, Ed.D.
- Schools: 8
- NCES District ID: 3604080

Students and staff
- Students: 5,842
- Teachers: 544.22 (on an FTE basis)
- Student–teacher ratio: 10.64
- District mascot: Marauders
- Colors: Maroon and white

Other information
- District Offices: 75 W Perkal St Bay Shore, NY 11706
- Website: www.bayshore.k12.ny.us

Bay Shore Union Free School District or Bay Shore Schools is a school district headquartered in Bay Shore, New York in the Town of Islip of Suffolk County, New York and on the South Shore of Long Island. The district serves the entirety of the hamlet of West Bay Shore and the Village of Brightwaters, and parts of two other hamlets; the vast majority of Bay Shore and a small part of North Bay Shore. Also, graduates of Woodhull School (PK-6) of the Fire Island School District can attend Bay Shore secondary schools.

== History ==
=== Early history ===
The predecessor to the modern district makes Bay Shore the oldest district in all of Islip Town, this being School District #1 of Islip Town. Bay Shore schools history dates back before 1820. The original district originally took up all of Bay Shore, and some historians believe the early district reached all the way to West Islip and even into the Town of Babylon. In 1836, District #8 took the eastern half of the district away from District #1, and also included part of Islip hamlet. The first school in the original District #1 was built around 1825, and had just one room. The West School on Clinton Street in District #1 opened nearly 50 years later in 1874. District #8's school was built in 1837, and was considered as one of the worst in the Town of Islip, until District #8 built its second school in 1874. District #8 became Union Free in 1865 and District #1 became Union Free in 1866. In 1892, Districts #1 and #8 came back together, forming the modern district.

=== The modern district ===
The current district was founded in 1893, coinciding with the first school being built. It was built between the original two districts, which was a swamp. This made sanitation completely impossible. The predecessor of Bay Shore High School was built nearby in 1922. The original school was an elementary school, and the original Bay Shore High School became one too in 1939. The schools would be closed in 1945 and 1954 due to the sanitation problems that had been present from the start. The Brook Avenue and Fifth Avenue schools were both built in 1928 and have been open since 1929. There was major expansion of the district in the late 1950s and early 1960s, as many schools in the modern district were opened or experienced growth in this time. South Country Elementary, which today serves students in grades 3-5, originally opened in 1957 as a K-6 school. Similarly, Gardiner Manor Elementary (originally opened in 1959) served grades K-5 at first and now serves grades 3-5 after serving grades K-6 and 4-6 at other points in their history. Bay Shore Middle School was opened in 1957 and has been a middle school since 1985. Mary G. Clarkson Elementary was opened in 1963, and Brook Avenue Elementary and Fifth Avenue Elementary both added major extensions in 1957.

In 2015, Joseph C. Bond became the interim superintendent; he previously was superintendent of the Brentwood Union Free School District.

In 2019 the district acquired electric school buses.

== Controversies ==
=== Marcus Johnson ===
In September 2017, Bay Shore High School teacher’s assistant Marcus Johnson, age 27, was arrested and charged with raping a 15‑year‑old student. Detectives from the Suffolk County Police Department’s Special Victims Section alleged that Johnson engaged in sexual intercourse with the student on multiple occasions, beginning when she was 14 years old.

Johnson worked as a teacher’s assistant for children with autism, though officials confirmed that the victim was not one of his assigned students. Prosecutors stated that some of the encounters occurred at Johnson’s Bay Shore residence, located near the high school. He was charged with rape in the second degree, rape in the third degree, and endangering the welfare of a child, and bail was set at $80,000 bond.

At his arraignment, Johnson pleaded not guilty. However, he later entered a guilty plea to charges connected to the case. He was subsequently convicted and sentenced to prison, though the exact length of his sentence was not widely reported in local media.

The Bay Shore Union Free School District placed Johnson on administrative leave immediately following his arrest and stated that it cooperated fully with law enforcement during the investigation. The case drew significant media attention and added to broader scrutiny of the district, which has faced multiple high‑profile misconduct cases involving staff members.

=== Daniel Garcia ===
In November 2022, Bay Shore High School graduate Daniel Garcia was charged with unlawful surveillance after authorities alleged he installed a recording device inside a school bathroom while assisting with the drama club. Prosecutors stated in court that Garcia had confessed to placing the device and that video evidence showed him installing it.

Garcia pleaded not guilty to the charge. His defense attorney declined to comment on the prosecution’s claims, noting only that the case would proceed through the courts. The district court judge issued two restraining orders on behalf of alleged victims who were filmed by the device.

=== Thomas Bernagozzi ===
In June 2024, retired Bay Shore elementary school teacher Thomas Bernagozzi was arraigned on five counts of possessing a sexual performance by a child. He pleaded not guilty to the charges. Bernagozzi had worked as a third‑grade teacher at Mary G. Clarkson Elementary School and Gardiner Manor Elementary School between 1970 and 2000, and was employed by the school district until 2003.

Prosecutors alleged that Bernagozzi engaged in a pattern of sexual abuse involving numerous students. Two victims came forward with claims that fell within the statute of limitations, reporting abuse between 1989–1991 and 1997–2000. In addition, more than 45 former students filed civil lawsuits against Bernagozzi and the Bay Shore Union Free School District.

In November 2024, a Suffolk County jury awarded $25 million in damages to plaintiffs in one of the civil cases, holding the district liable for its continued employment of Bernagozzi. The award was later subject to judicial review, with a judge proposing a reduced settlement of $4 million unless a retrial or agreement was reached. Separately, in December 2024, the Bay Shore school board approved a $35 million settlement to resolve claims brought by 12 former students.

Bail in the original indictment was set at $1 million cash or $2.5 million bond, though Bernagozzi was later placed on supervised release with a GPS monitor. A judge declined to set bail on the new charges, as they were not bail‑eligible.

=== John Kennedy ===
In October 2025, Bay Shore High School art teacher John Kennedy was placed on administrative leave after allegations surfaced that he exchanged sexually explicit text messages with a female student. The Bay Shore Union Free School District stated that it took immediate action once informed, barring Kennedy from district property and notifying the Suffolk County Police Department.

Police confirmed that an investigation was ongoing but did not publicly identify the teacher. However, multiple outlets reported that Kennedy was the staff member under investigation. According to students interviewed by the press, Kennedy, who was 52 at the time and widely regarded as a “favorite teacher,” had previously made some female students uncomfortable with his physical contact and behavior. One student described him as initially “funny and nice” but said his actions became “weirder and weirder,” including instances of unsolicited physical contact such as hugging from behind.

== Schools ==
Schools in the district (all schools are located in Bay Shore, New York 11706):

| School name | Type of school | Address | Grades | Principal |
|---|---|---|---|---|
| Bay Shore High School | High school | 155 Third Avenue | 9-12 | Stephen Gordon |
| Bay Shore Middle School | Middle school | 393 Brook Avenue | 6-8 | Duncan MacDougal |
| South Country Elementary | Intermediate school | 885 Hampshire Road | 3-5 | Jennifer Maher |
| Gardiner Manor Elementary | Intermediate school | 125 Wohseepee Drive | 3-5 | Maddalena Padilla |
| Mary G. Clarkson Elementary | Elementary school | 1415 East Third Avenue | K-2 | Erin Lentini |
| Brook Avenue Elementary | Elementary school | 45 Brook Avenue | K-2 | Joseph Lemke |
| Fifth Avenue Elementary | Elementary school | 217 Fifth Avenue | K-2 | Michelle Stowers |
| Universal Pre-Kindergarten | Pre-K school | 70 Brentwood Road | Pre-K | Does not have a principal, program administrator is Claudia Rivera. |
