= List of tourist attractions on Long Island =

The following is a list of attractions on Long Island, New York State. The list includes museums, parks, and beaches as well as many other types of attractions.

In this list, "Long Island" is defined as the geographical entity, and thus the list includes attractions in Kings County, New York, a.k.a. Brooklyn, as well as Queens County, New York, a.k.a. Queens, which are both parts of New York City. The list also includes attractions further out on Long Island, those in Nassau County, New York and Suffolk County, New York, which are not parts of NYC but instead are parts of New York State.

== Long Island attractions ==
County	Landmark	Photo	Description	Date Opened
Kings	Brooklyn Museum		Located on Long Island in New York City's borough of Brooklyn, it is the second-largest art museum in New York City, and one of the largest in the United States.	1897
Kings	Brooklyn Tabernacle		The Brooklyn Tabernacle is one of New York City's largest churches and Grammy Award winning Choir.	1981
Kings	Brooklyn Bridge		Built in 1874, the Brooklyn Bridge is the oldest existing suspension bridge in the U.S.	1874
Kings	Coney Island		Between about 1880 and World War II, Coney Island was the largest amusement area in the United States; today, it contains two amusement parks and several other attractions clustered around the Riegelmann Boardwalk.	1880s to present
Kings	Prospect Park		The country's longest open park meadow, with ancient trees in Brooklyn's only extant forest.	1898
Queens	Citi Field		The home stadium of the New York Mets baseball team.	2009
Queens	Rockaway Peninsula		Also called The Rockaways, a popular summer resort area since the 1830s, containing the Rockaway Beach and Boardwalk and Jacob Riis Park on its southern shore.	1830
Queens	The Unisphere		The symbol of Queens, the Unisphere is a giant globe in Flushing Meadows Park.	1964
Nassau	Belmont Park		A thoroughbred horse racetrack that is the home of the Belmont Stakes, the final leg of the Triple Crown.	1905
Nassau	Elderfields Preserve		A historic preserve and art gallery featuring one of the oldest extant structures in Nassau County.	c. 1675
Nassau	Jones Beach		Jones Beach Tower, now a familiar Jones Beach State Park landmark, was modeled on the campanile of St Mark's Basilica in Venice.	1928
Nassau	Nassau Veterans Memorial Coliseum		Former home arena of the New York Islanders hockey team.	1972
Nassau	Old Westbury Gardens		Charles II - Westbury House, style mansion designed by George A. Crawley, contains 23 rooms. The grounds cover 160 acres.	1903
Nassau	Planting Fields Arboretum State Historic Park		An arboretum and state park covering over 400 acres (160 ha) located in the Village of Upper Brookville in the town of Oyster Bay, New York.	1918 - 1921
Nassau	Sagamore Hill		Sagamore Hill was the home of the 26th President of the United States, Theodore Roosevelt, from 1886 until his death in 1919.	1884
Nassau	UBS Arena		Current home arena for the New York Islanders hockey team.	2021
Nassau	Welwyn Preserve		Welwyn Preserve was the estate of Harold I. Pratt. It is now a 204 acre nature reserve, and the mansion houses a Holocaust museum	1913
Suffolk	Adventureland		Adventureland is a 12-acre amusement park in East Farmingdale, New York.	1962
Suffolk	American Airpower Museum		The American Airpower Museum, the former site of the Republic factory in Farmingdale, New York, maintains a collection of Republic artifacts, and an array of aircraft spanning the many years of the aircraft factory's history.	Post World War II
Suffolk	Bald Hill		Bald Hill Memorial is located in Farmingville, NY. This destination pays tribute to U.S. Veterans to honor the men and women that served the country during the Vietnam War.	1991
Suffolk	Big Duck		A ferrocement building in the shape of a large duck.	1931
Suffolk	Captree State Park		A state park located on the south shore off Jones Island (the barrier island that includes Jones Beach), overlooking the Fire Island Inlet Bridge and the westernmost section of Fire Island. Captree is a fisherman's haven and a picnicker's delight.	1954
Suffolk	Fire Island Light		Fire Island Lighthouse is a 180 foot stone tower that began operation in 1858 replacing the 74 foot tower originally built in 1826.	1826 (Rebuilt) 1858
Suffolk	Robert Moses Causeway		The Fire Island Inlet, Great South Bay, and State Boat Channel bridges to one of Long Island's great Atlantic coast islands – such as Fire and Jones Beach Island – and connecting to Ocean Parkway.	1963
Suffolk	Long Island Game Farm		(Petting Zoo) with over 200 animals. The Long Island Game Farm is one of the island's oldest and most well-known establishments.	1970
Suffolk	Port Jefferson Harbor		Port Jefferson Harbor continues to attract mariners, visitors, tourists, and families to an area where natural beauty is the setting for a wide variety of activities, including a ferry service to Connecticut.	Early 1900s
Suffolk	Splish Splash		Splish Splash is a 96-acre water park in Riverhead, New York.	1991

== Public beaches ==
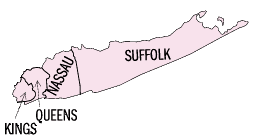

Long Island is well known for its many public beaches. They include (from west to east):

- Coney Island (in Brooklyn)
  - Coney Island Beach and Boardwalk
- The Rockaways (in Queens)
  - Jacob Riis Park Beach
  - Rockaway Beach and Boardwalk
- Nickerson Beach (in Lido Beach)
- Long Beach
- Town of Hempstead Beaches: Harbor Isle, Lido, Malibu, and Point Lookout.
- Town of North Hempstead Beaches: Bar Beach and Manorhaven
- Town of Oyster Bay Beaches: Centre Island, Ransom, Stehli, Tappen, Tobay
- Cedar Beach (Fire Island)
- Jones Beach (Nassau County) - one of the most famous in the world
- Captree State Park
- Robert Moses State Park (Suffolk County)
- Sunken Meadow State Park, Kings Park in Suffolk County
- Town of Islip Beaches: Islip, East Islip, West Islip, Bayport and Ronkonkoma Beaches, Sayville Marina Park, Benjamin Beach at Bay Shore Marina, and several along the barrier beach of Fire Island, including Atlantique, Kismet, Dunewood, and Fair Harbor
- Town of Babylon Beaches: Gilgo Beach, Cedar Beach, and Overlook Beach
- Town of Brookhaven Beaches: West Meadow, Cedar, Shirley, Shoreham, Stony Brook, Cedar Beach
- Town of Riverhead Beaches, including Iron Pier Beach
- Town of Southold Beaches: Kenny's Road, Horton Lane, and Hashamomuck Beaches.
- Town of Smithtown Beaches: Short Beach, Long Beach, Callahan's Beach
- Town of Huntington Beaches: Asharoken, Centerport, Crab Meadow, Crescent, Gold Star Battalion, Hobart, Fleets Cove, West Neck
- Town of Southampton Beaches: Tiana, Ponquogue, and various others on Dune Road and Gin Lane
- Smith Point County Park (Suffolk County)
- Cupsogue Beach County Park
- Hampton Bays in Town of Southampton area Suffolk County (Beaches: Ponquogue Beach, Meshutt Beach on Peconic Bay, Shinnecock Inlet Beach, K Road, L Road, Tiana Beach, and Road I on both Shinnecock Bay and the Atlantic Ocean.)
- East Hampton Main beach
- Hither Hills State Park
- Montauk Point State Park

== Public parks and nature preserves ==
- Bethpage State Park
- Caleb Smith State Park Preserve
- Cedar Creek County Park, Seaford
- Christopher Morley Park
- Eisenhower Park
- Elderfields Preserve
- Hither Hills State Park
- Montauk Point State Park
- Nissequogue River State Park
- South Haven County Park
- Sunken Meadow State Park
- Welwyn Preserve in Glen Cove

== Country clubs ==
Long Island is also home to numerous country clubs, polo clubs, golf clubs, and other private recreational organizations, including:

- Bretton Woods Country Club (Coram)
- Bridgehampton Polo Club (Bridgehampton)
- Brookville Country Club (Glen Head)
- Cherry Valley Country Club (Garden City)
- Cold Spring Harbor Country Club (Cold Spring Hills)
- Colonial Springs Country Club (East Farmingdale)
- The Crescent Beach Club (Bayville)
- Crest Hollow Country Club (Woodbury)
- Deepdale Golf Club (North Hills)
- Fresh Meadow Country Club (Lake Success)
- Garden City Country Club (Garden City)
- Garden City Golf Club (Garden City)
- Glen Head Country Club (Glen Head)
- Glen Oaks Club (Old Westbury)
- Engineers Country Club (Roslyn Harbor)
- Hamlet Golf and Country Club (Commack)
- The Hamlet Windwatch Golf Club (Hauppauge)
- Hempstead Golf and Country Club (Hempstead)
- Huntington Country Club (Huntington)
- Huntington Crescent Club (Huntington)
- Lake Success Country Club (Lake Success)
- Long Island Country Clubhouse in Eastport, New York
- Manhasset Bay Yacht Club (Port Washington)
- Meadow Brook Golf Club (Jericho)
- Moments Golf Club (Elmont)
- Maidstone Club (East Hampton)
- Nassau Country Club (Glen Cove)
- Nissequogue Point Beach Club (Smithtown)
- North Hempstead Country Club (Flower Hill)
- North Hills Country Club (North Hills)
- Northport Yacht Club (Huntington)
- Old Westbury Country Club (Old Westbury)
- Plandome Country Club (Plandome)
- Port Jefferson Country Club at Harbor Hills (Port Jefferson)
- Port Washington Yacht Club (Port Washington)
- Roslyn Country Club (Roslyn Heights)
- Rockville Links Country Club (Rockville Centre)
- St. George's Club (Stony Brook)
- Sands Point Golf Club (Sands Point)
- Sayville Yacht Club (Blue Point)
- Seawane Country Club (Hewlett Harbor)
- Smithtown Landing Country Club (Smithtown)
- South Fork Country Club (Amagansett)
- Southward Ho Country Club (Brightwaters)
- Stonebridge Country Club (Hauppauge)
- Strathmore Vanderbilt Country Club (Strathmore)
- Timber Point Country Club (Great River)
- Towers Country Club (Floral Park)
- Village Club of Sands Point (Sands Point)
- Westhampton Country Club (Westhampton)
- Westhampton Yacht Squadron (Remsenburg)
- Wheatley Hills Golf Club (East Williston; Roslyn Heights)
- Woodbury Country Club (Woodbury)
- Woodside Country Club (Muttontown)

== See also ==
- List of trails on Long Island
- List of museums on Long Island
- Parks and recreation in New York City
