= East Rockaway Inlet =

Inlet in New York, United States

Coordinates: 40.5886°N 73.7547°W

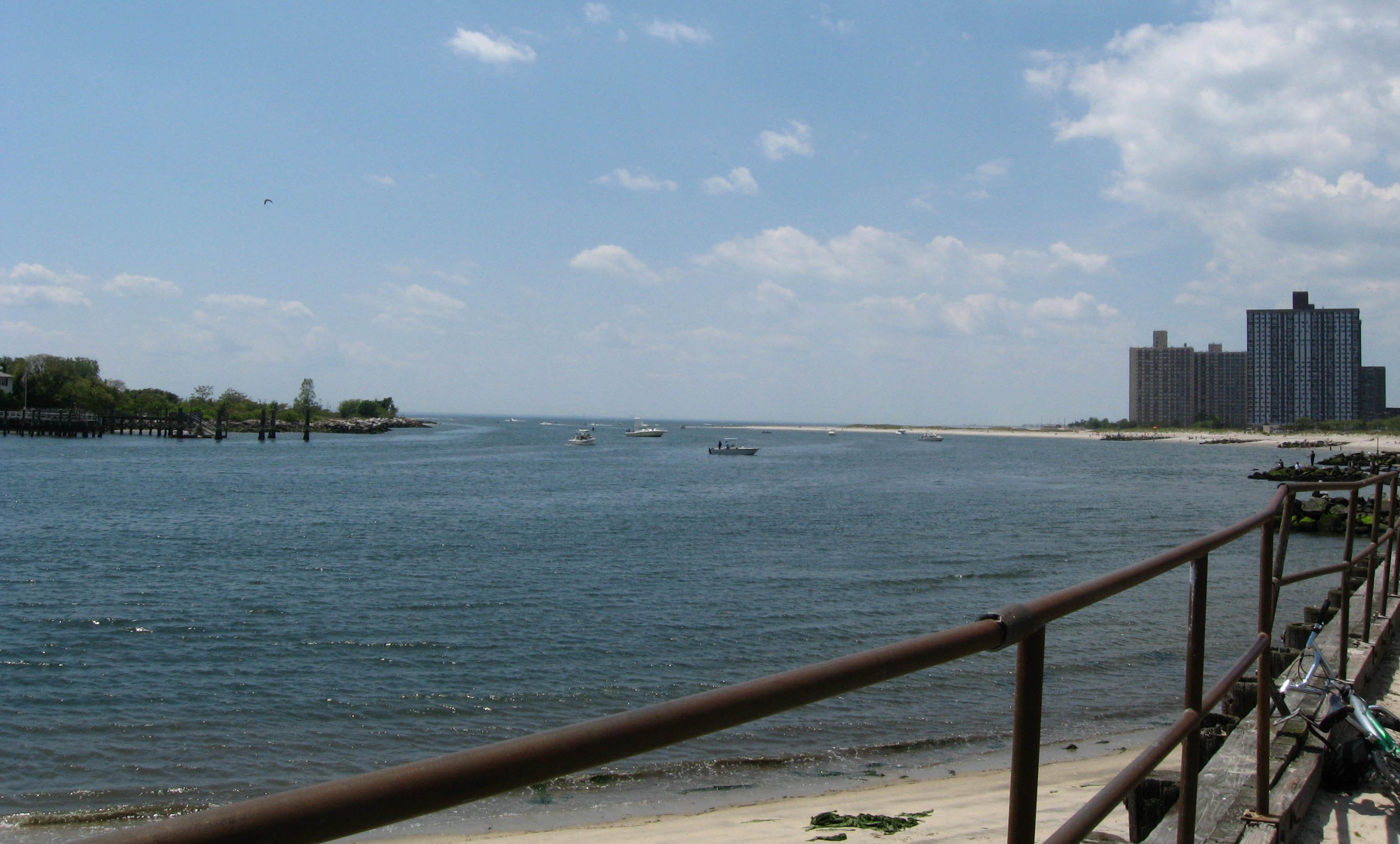
Looking west in Rockaway Inlet

The East Rockaway Inlet is an arm of the Atlantic Ocean which separates the Rockaway Peninsula from the barrier island which includes the Nassau County, New York communities of Atlantic Beach, Long Beach and Lido Beach. The inlet is on the south shore of Long Island. It provides for a channel 12 feet deep and 250 feet wide. A 3,000 foot jetty on the western side of the channel was authorized but never constructed, and was eventually deauthorized by Congress in 1977.

According to a plaque in Long Beach, New York, the original inlet was through Long Beach directly opposite East Rockaway, New York, hence the name. A decision was made to create a new inlet between Far Rockaway, New York, and Atlantic Beach and the original was filled in with the fill from the newly created inlet.

The inlet is traversed by the Atlantic Beach Bridge. Its eastern extension is the Reynolds Channel.

== See also ==
- Jones Inlet
- Jones Beach Island
- Fire Island Inlet Bridge
- Captree State Park
- Jones Beach State Park
- State Boat Channel Bridge
- Great South Bay Bridge
- Fire Island
- Robert Moses State Park
- Fire Island Light
- Patchogue Bay
- Moriches Inlet
