= Shinnecock Inlet =

Atlantic Ocean shoreline feature near NYC

Coordinates: 40°50′33″N 72°28′34″W

Shinnecock Inlet is the easternmost of five major inlets connecting bays to the Atlantic Ocean through the narrow 100-mile-long (160 km) Outer Barrier that stretches from New York City to Southampton, New York on the south shore of Long Island. It splits Westhampton Island from the peninsula extending from Southampton Village. The inlet was formed by the 1938 New England hurricane, which killed several people when it permanently broke through the island in Hampton Bays, New York. The name comes from the Shinnecock Indian Nation.

Maintenance of the inlet has been controversial. It saves boaters in the Hamptons several miles in access to the Atlantic Ocean. The inlet is almost directly lined up with the Shinnecock Canal between Shinnecock Bay and the Peconic Bay, which allows a shortcut to the ocean for boaters on the North Fork of Long Island.

Consequently, management has been geared to keep the inlet dredged and open. However, the inlet has interrupted the flow of sand (which normally flows east to west) and consequently there has been major beach erosion on the west side of the inlet including the December 1992 Nor'easter that wiped out much of West Hampton Dunes, New York. The phenomenon is called longshore drift.

Efforts to prevent erosion with groines have just pushed the problems further west resulting in serious beach erosion problems on Fire Island. West Hampton Dunes was incorporated in 1993 specifically to have legal standing in the skirmishes with Corps of Engineers regarding the practice. In 2010, the inlet was dredged and the sand deposited on the beach at Road K as part of the West of Shinnecock Inlet Interim Plan to replenish the sand.

In 1996, following the crash of TWA Flight 800 off the coast of Long Island, Shinnecock Inlet, 18 mi (29 km) to the northeast of the debris field, served as the primary water access route for vessels transporting wreckage and human remains to shore for most of the recovery effort.

The other major inlets on the barrier beach are:

- Rockaway Inlet
- East Rockaway Inlet
- Fire Island Inlet
- Moriches Inlet
- Jones Inlet
