= Lighthouse Beach =

Beach in New York, United States

Lighthouse Beach is a small section of the Fire Island National Seashore that is adjacent to Robert Moses State Park on New York's Long Island. It was notable for having sections that were officially designated as clothing optional prior to 2013.

The beach is named for the nearby Fire Island Lighthouse and was formerly the largest recognized clothing optional beach in New York. On 5 February 2013, the Fire Island National Seashore announced its plan to begin enforcing New York State anti-nudity laws on all Fire Island beaches, including Lighthouse Beach, ending clothing optional usage. However, the decision does not change the official status granted for the practice of female toplessness, which is still allowed.

The beach is approximately one mile (1.6 km) long and can be defined as the ocean facing beach between Robert Moses State Park and the community of Kismet. Technically, it is in the Town of Islip.

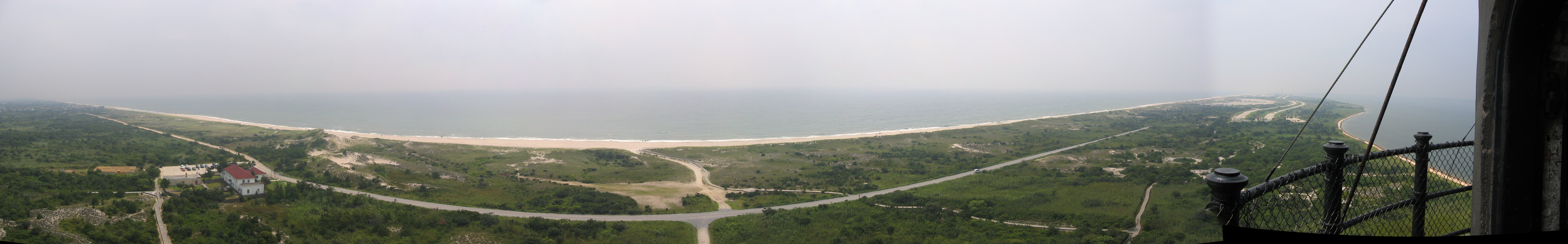
This image taken from the top of the lighthouse facing south shows the entirety of Lighthouse Beach. The parking lot of Field 5 of Robert Moses State Park can be seen next to the beach on the far right and the community of Kismet can be just seen in the mist on the far left.

== Location ==
| Point | Coordinates (links to map & photo sources) | Notes |
|---|---|---|
| Western end | 40.628252°N 73.225529°W | Border of Robert Moses State Park and Fire Island National Seashore |
| Mid-point | 40.629946°N 73.217703°W | Textile section |
| Eastern end | 40.632568°N 73.204758°W | Border of Kismet |

== History ==
There are some reports of nudists using the beach as far back as World War II, getting to the island by rowboat. After the Robert Moses Causeway was extended to Fire Island in 1964, the clothing optional usage expanded greatly in the 1970s.

Originally, the entire stretch of beach was clothing optional, however there have been some complaints from users objecting to the nudity going back to the 1980s. These complaints were largely from parents who visited the lighthouse and were surprised by the nudity on the beach.

In 1994, due to negotiations between Friends of Lighthouse Beach and the National Park Service, the center section was made non-clothing optional or textile so that visitors from the lighthouse who did not want to see nudity could enjoy the beach.

Since 5 February 2013, the entirety of Lighthouse Beach has no longer been clothing optional. Bathing suits are required at all times, and violators face a maximum penalty of a $5,000 fine and six months in prison. In New York State, women are legally permitted to be topless and continue to do so at this beach.

The beach is widely regarded as family friendly.

== Access ==
Since there is no vehicular traffic permitted in the Seashore, visitors must come in from the Robert Moses State Park in the west or the community of Kismet in the east. There is currently no handicapped access to the beach. In the past, there were accessible ramps from the westernmost boardwalk, but these have been destroyed by winter storms and have not yet been replaced.

== Services ==
There are very limited services at this beach. There are no lifeguards or concessions. There are no trash receptacles making it a Carry in, Carry out facility. As with the rest of the Seashore, law enforcement is provided by National Park Service Rangers with occasional visits from the Suffolk County Police. At least two volunteer organizations work to ensure users are aware of appropriate behavior.
