= Robert Moses (disambiguation) =

Robert Moses (1888–1981) was an American city planner.

Robert Moses may also refer to:

- Bob Moses (activist) (1935–2021), American educator and civil rights activist
- Bob Moses, American football player in the 1962 Cotton Bowl Classic
- Bob Moses (musician) (born 1948), American jazz drummer and educator
- Bob Moses (band), a musical duo from Vancouver, Canada
- Bob Moses (rugby league) (1940–2017), Australian rugby league footballer

== See also ==
- Robert Mose, MP
- Robert Moses Causeway, Long Island, New York, United States
- Robert Moses' Kin, American dance company founded in 1995
- Robert Moses Niagara Power Plant, hydroelectricity power plant
- Robert Moses State Park (disambiguation)
- Robert Moses State Parkway, near Niagara Falls, New York, United States
- Moses-Saunders Power Dam, between Massena, New York and Cornwall, Ontario, on the St. Lawrence River
