= State Boat Channel Bridge =

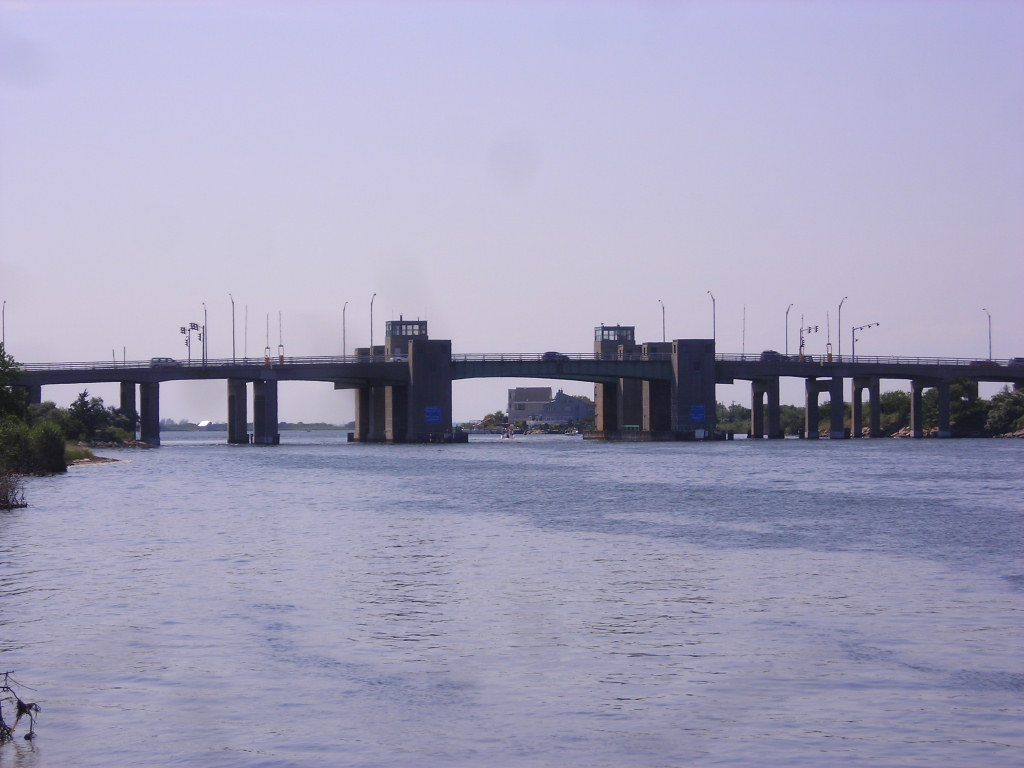
- The State Boat Channel Bridge, as seen in 2006.
- Coordinates: 40°38′33″N 73°15′48″W
- Carries: Robert Moses Causeway
- Crosses: Long Island New York State Boat Channel
- Maintained by: NYSDOT

Characteristics
- Design: Twin bascule bridges
- Total length: 665 feet (203 m)

Location
- Interactive map of State Boat Channel Bridge

The State Boat Channel Bridge is a twin-span bascule bridge in Suffolk County, New York, United States. It carries the Robert Moses Causeway over the Long Island New York State Boat Channel between Captree Island and Jones Beach Island, in Oak Beach and Captree on the Babylon–Islip town border.

== Description ==
The 665-foot-long (203 m) bascule bridge meets the Ocean Parkway at a cloverleaf interchange. This interchange, which provides access to Captree State Park, Gilgo State Park and Jones Beach State Park, served as the southern terminus of the Robert Moses Causeway that leads to the Fire Island Inlet Bridge, the Fire Island Lighthouse, and Robert Moses State Park.

The bridge underwent renovations during the 2000s.

== See also ==
- Fire Island Inlet Bridge
- Great South Bay Bridge
