= Cedar Beach =

Cedar Beach can mean:

== Census designated places ==
- Cedar Beach, New Jersey, USA
- Cedar Beach, Southold (CDP), New York, USA
- Cedar Beach, Egypt
- Cedar Beach, Durham Regional Municipality, Ontario, Canada
- Cedar Beach, Essex County, Ontario, Canada

== Beaches ==
- Cedar Beach (Babylon, New York), USA
- Cedar Beach (Brookhaven, New York), USA
