= Captree, New York =

- Hamlet and Census-designated place
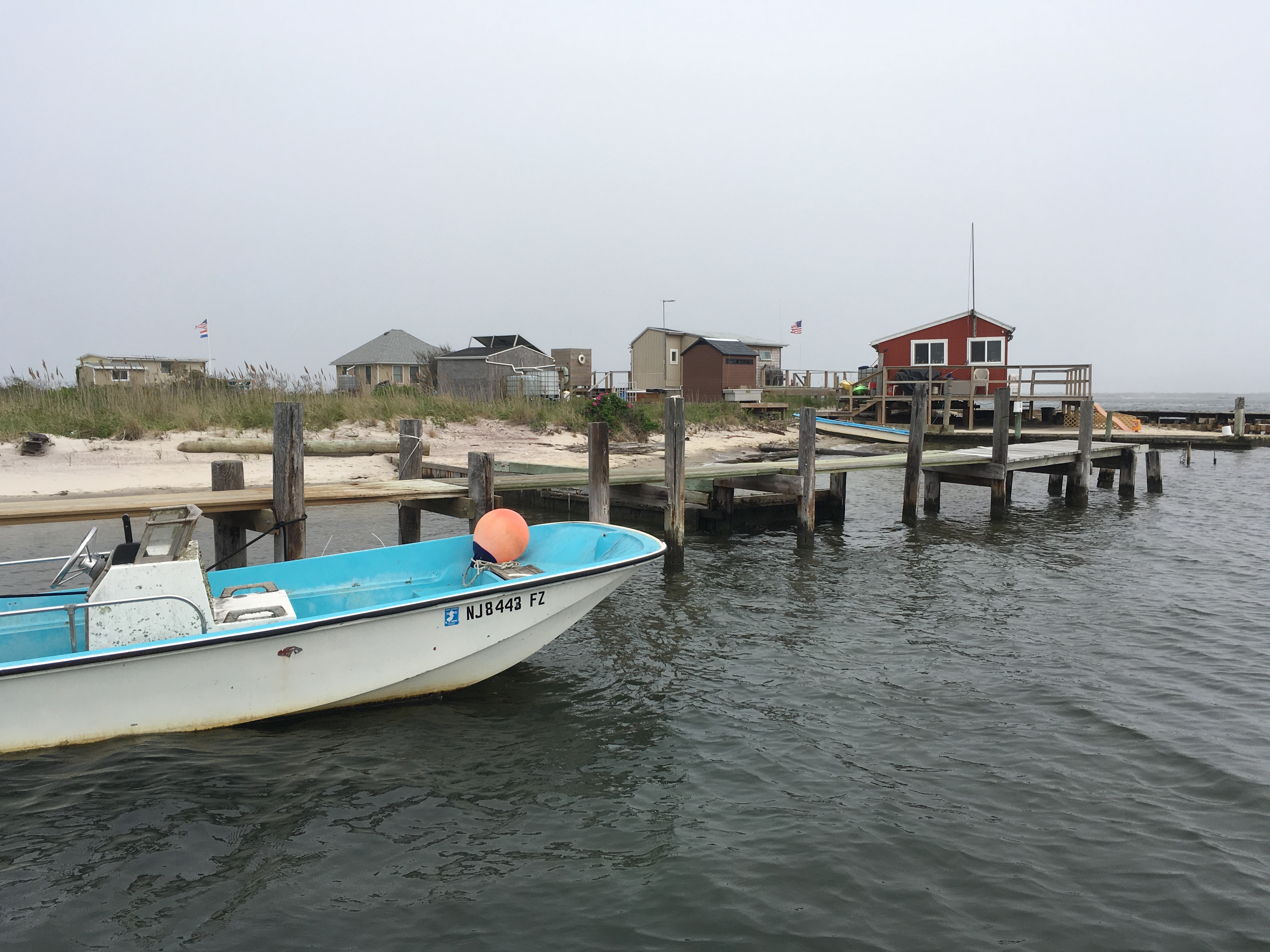
- The cottages on Captree Island

- Location within the state of New York
- Coordinates: 40°38′24″N 73°15′29″W
- Country: United States
- State: New York
- County: Suffolk
- Towns: Babylon; Islip

Area
  - Total: 2.80 sq mi (7.24 km^{2})
  - Land: 1.62 sq mi (4.19 km^{2})
  - Water: 1.18 sq mi (3.05 km^{2})
- Elevation: 5 ft (1.5 m)

Population (2020)
  - Total: 48
  - Density: 29.7/sq mi (11.46/km^{2})
- Time zone: UTC-5 (Eastern (EST))
  - Summer (DST): UTC-4 (EDT)
- ZIP Code: 11702
- Area codes: 631 / 934
- FIPS code: 36-12402
- GNIS feature ID: 2805097

Captree is a hamlet and census-designated place (CDP) located on the Outer Barrier, within the towns of Babylon and Islip, in Suffolk County, New York, United States. It occupies Captree Island in Great South Bay, as well as the east end of Jones Beach Island to the south, comprising Captree State Park. The population was 48 at the time of the 2020 census.

== History ==
Captree was first listed as a CDP prior to the 2020 census. Prior to that it was part of the Oak Beach–Captree CDP.

== Geography ==
According to the United States Census Bureau, the CDP has an area of 2.8 square miles (7.3 km^{2}),

The community is in southwestern Suffolk County, on two islands that lie between Long Island to the north and Fire Island to the south. The eastern two-thirds of the CDP are in the town of Islip, while the one-third of the CDP that occupies the portion of Captree Island west of the Robert Moses Causeway is in the town of Babylon.

== Demographics ==
As of the 2020 census, there were 48 people residing in the CDP.

Historical population
Census	Pop.	Note	%±
2020	48		—
U.S. Decennial Census

== Parks and recreation ==
Captree State Park is located within the hamlet.

== Education ==
Captree is located within the boundaries of (and is thus served by) the Babylon Union Free School District.

== Infrastructure ==
The Robert Moses Causeway connects Captree and Jones Beach islands with West Islip, six miles (10 km) to the north on Long Island. Ocean Parkway runs west from Captree through Oak Beach and Gilgo, leading 14 miles (23 km) to Jones Beach State Park. To the south, the Fire Island Inlet Bridge leads one mile (1.6 km) to Robert Moses State Park on Fire Island.

== See also ==
- Gilgo, New York
- Oak Beach, New York
