= Great South Bay Bridge =

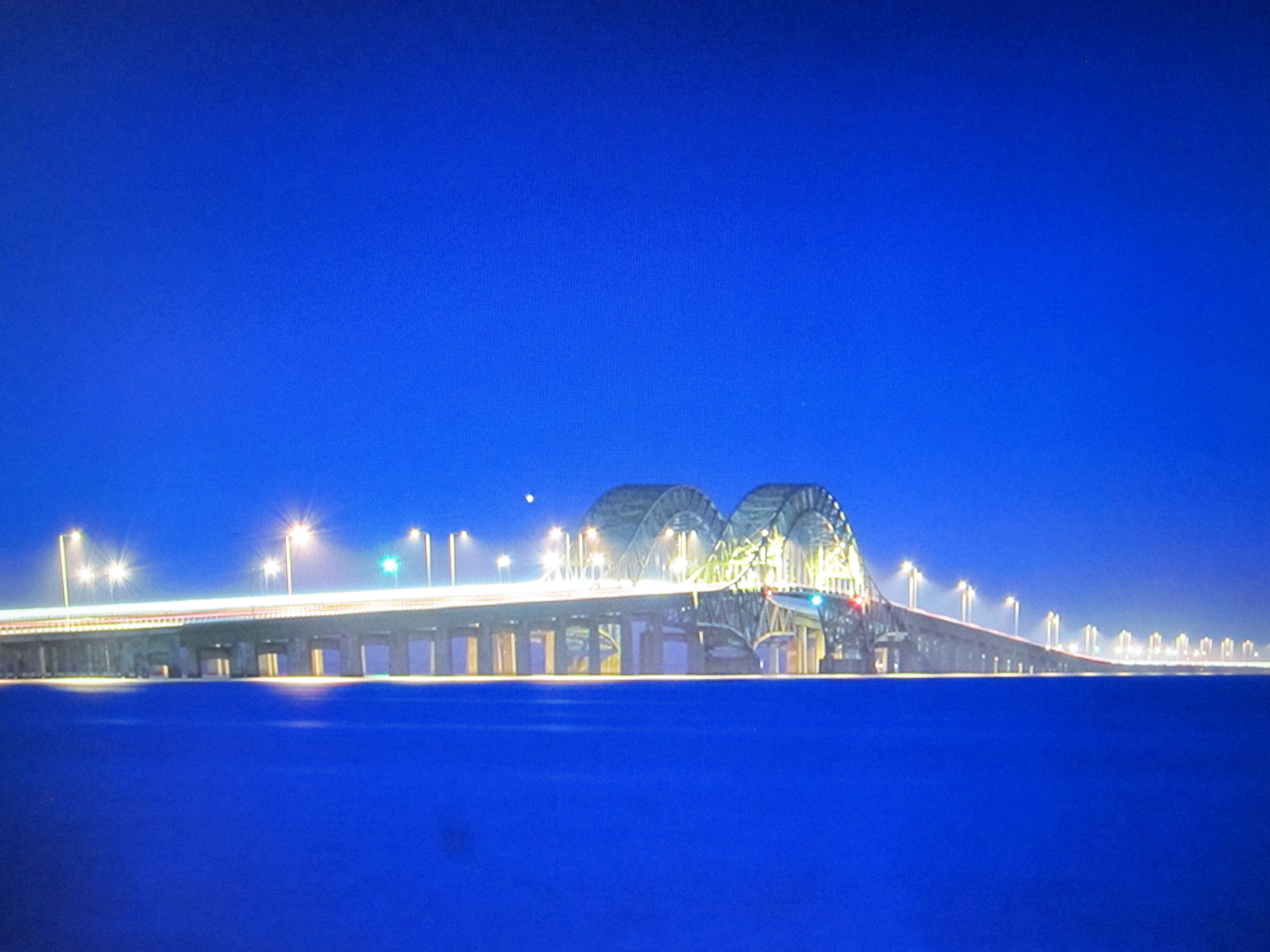
- The twin bridge spans, as seen at night.
- Coordinates: 40°40′34″N 73°16′27″W
- Carries: 5 lanes of Robert Moses Causeway
- Crosses: Great South Bay
- Other name: Captree Bridge
- Maintained by: NYSDOT

Characteristics
- Design: Twin through arch spans
- Total length: 10,519.5 feet (3,206.3 m)
- Width: 26.6 feet (8.1 m)
- Longest span: 590 feet (180 m)
- Clearance above: 16.2 feet (4.9 m)

Statistics
- Daily traffic: 7,659 (as of 2007)

Location
- Interactive map of Great South Bay Bridge

The Great South Bay Bridge (historically known as the Captree Bridge) is a twin-span bridge on the southwest side of Suffolk County, New York, on Long Island. It carries the Robert Moses Causeway over the Great South Bay, between Long Island's South Shore and Captree Island. It serves as access via the Robert Moses Causeway to both of the downstream crossings, the State Boat Channel Bridge and the Fire Island Inlet Bridge, also leading visitors and on-lookers to the Captree State Park, Fire Island Lighthouse, Jones Beach Island, or Robert Moses State Park. The Great South Bay Bridge also appears on the New York VFR Sectional Chart as a VFR reporting point, under the name Robert Moses Causeway Twin Bridge.

== History ==
The bridge was originally a single span, that opened in 1954 and was called the Captree Bridge. Today, the original span carries all southbound traffic.

On April 22, 1968, a second, parallel span opened to traffic and carried all northbound traffic. This brought much-needed relief to traffic heading back from Jones Beach, Robert Moses, and Captree parks. The bridges are through trusses and are painted in a traditional "bridge green" hue.

In 1997, a major rebuild of the deck of the older span began and was completed in 2000. Safety compliant railings were installed on the older span. In 2013–2014, the northbound span received upgraded railings. Major improvements NYSDOT is considering is a cycle/pedestrian path shared with the northbound lanes. NYSDOT has not released any official plans.

== See also ==
- Fire Island Inlet Bridge
- State Boat Channel Bridge
