= Islip, New York =

- Town
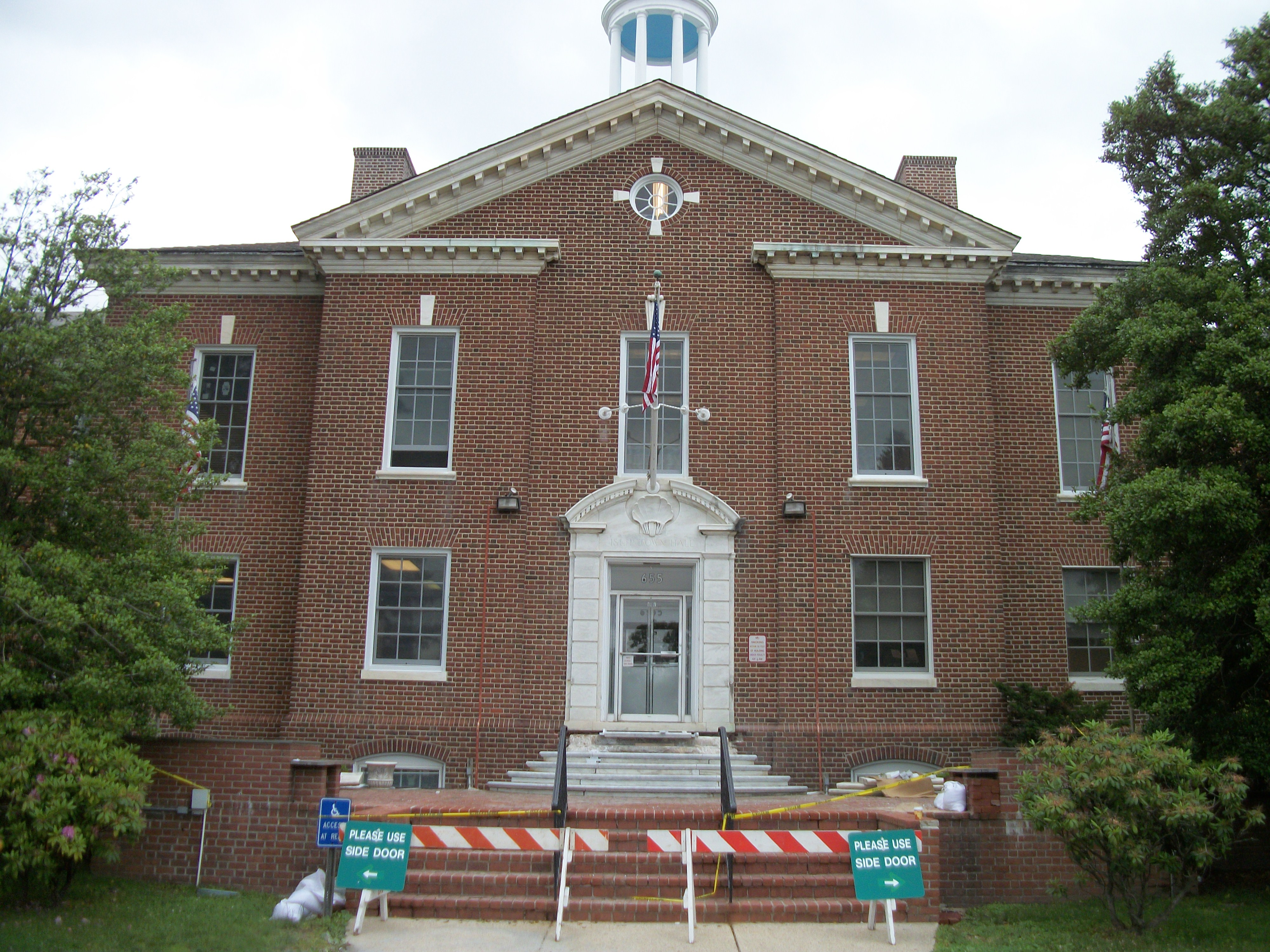
- Islip Town Hall in 2012

- Flag Seal
- Motto: Fide sed cui vide
- Interactive map of Islip, New York
- Location within New York Location within the United States
- Coordinates: 40°45′24″N 73°11′56″W
- Country: United States
- State: New York
- County: Suffolk
- Incorporated: 1683
- Named for: Islip, Northamptonshire

Government
  - Type: Civil Township
  - Supervisor: Angie M. Carpenter (R)

Area
  - Total: 162.97 sq mi (422.10 km^{2})
  - Land: 103.80 sq mi (268.84 km^{2})
  - Water: 59.17 sq mi (153.26 km^{2})
- Elevation: 6.6 ft (2 m)

Population (2020)
  - Total: 339,938
  - Density: 3,275/sq mi (1,264.5/km^{2})
- Time zone: UTC-5 (Eastern (EST))
  - Summer (DST): UTC-4 (EDT)
- ZIP code: 11705, 11706, 11716, 11717, 11718, 11722, 11730, 11739, 11749, 11751, 11752, 11760, 11769, 11770, 11782, 11795, 11796, 11702 (part), 11729 (part), 11742 (part), 11741 (part)
- Area codes: 631, 934
- FIPS code: 36-38000
- GNIS feature ID: 0979097
- Website: www.islipny.gov

Islip (/ˈaɪslɪp/ EYE-slip) is a town in Suffolk County, New York, United States, on the South Shore of Long Island. The population was 339,938 at the time of the 2020 census, making it the fourth most populous city or town in the New York metropolitan area. The Town of Islip also contains a smaller, unincorporated hamlet and census-designated place named Islip, which serves as the town seat.

== History ==
Matthias Nicoll relocated to New York from Islip, Northamptonshire, England, in 1664. His son, William Nicoll, became a royal patentee of the east end of what is now the Town of Islip, and his domain reached from East Islip to Bayport and included Sayville, West Sayville, Oakdale, Great River, Islip Terrace, Central Islip, Hauppauge, Holbrook, Bohemia, Brentwood, Holtsville and a portion of Ronkonkoma. All of this land was purchased from Winne-quaheagh, Sachem (chief) of Connetquot, in 1683; the Town of Islip was incorporated that same year. The yearly fee paid to Governor Thomas Dongan of New York was five bushels of quality winter wheat or 25 shillings. Other early land patentees were Andrew Gibb (Islip Hamlet), John Mowbray (Bay Shore, originally Awixa), Stephan Van Cortlandt (Sagtikos Manor), and Thomas Willets (West Islip).

By 1710, the colonial government passed an act to enable the precinct of Islip in the County of Suffolk to elect two assessors, a collector, a constable and a supervisor. The people had a voice. Growth, however, remained at a standstill until the Revolutionary War ended when, in the 17 years that followed, there was more progress than in the 50 years preceding. This activity was partly due to the impact of American shipping.

By 1825, it was necessary to install a Fire Island light across the Great South Bay and regular ferry service between Bay Shore and Fire Island began in 1862. In 1867[?] the Long Island Rail Road came to Islip and the first depot was built. People were discovering Islip and the tourist trade soon took hold.

Tourism brought much wealth into the area and business sprung up to service the hotels that began to dot the landscape. Some of those tourists stayed on and built summer homes, thus the vacationers and the town seemed to enjoy a mutual prosperity. But the old guard was changing. Early in the 20th century, diesel-powered ferries replaced the whale boats while housing developments and small manufacturing firms sprang up on the sites of old farms. Like the rest of the country, Islip and all of Long Island suffered during the Stock Market Crash and the Great Depression. When the veterans returned home from World War II, there was a housing shortage in New York City, but a rebirth on Long Island. Within a decade following the end of the war, Islip began to turn from a bucolic farming community into a bustling suburb, becoming what was once described as a "bedroom" of New York City. The influx of people was tremendous - from 71,000 in 1950 to 280,000 in 1970. Then, as growth continued eastward on Long Island, the pace in Islip slowed.

In 1987, the 430 tons of ash that resulted from incineration of the cargo of the Mobro 4000 "Garbage Barge" was added to the landfill in Islip. In response to the garbage barge incident, the Town of Islip developed Keep Islip Clean, WRAP, and other environmentally friendly initiatives to help bolster its image. These acts resulted in one of the first comprehensive recycling programs in the United States.

== Geography ==
Islip is bounded by the Atlantic Ocean to the south, Babylon to the west (at approximately Route 231), Smithtown to the north (at approximately the Long Island Expressway), and Brookhaven to the east (at approximately Nicolls Road). It also shares a small border with Huntington to the northwest.

According to the United States Census Bureau, the town has a total area of 162.8 square miles (422 km^{2}), of which 103.2 square miles (267 km^{2}) is land and 59.6 square miles (154 km^{2}) (36.61%) is water.

The town includes part of Fire Island, Jones Beach Island, and Captree Island, which are separated from Long Island by the Great South Bay.

=== Climate ===
Summer storms – such as this one viewed from a marina in Saltaire – are common during the summer months in Islip

Under the Köppen climate classification, Islip has a humid continental climate (Dfa), with some maritime influence, or under the −3 °C or 26.6 °F threshold a humid subtropical climate (Cfa); it is part of USDA hardiness zone 7a. The normal average monthly temperature ranges from 31.9 °F (−0.1 °C) in January to 75.0 °F (23.9 °C) in July; on average, there are 16.3 afternoons where the temperature remains at or below freezing and 8.3 afternoons with a high at or above 90 °F or 32.2 °C annually; the last year to not reach the latter mark was 2014. Temperatures below −5 °F (−20.6 °C) or above 100 °F (37.8 °C) are rare, and were last seen respectively on January 7, 2018, at −5 °F or −20.6 °C and July 22, 2011, at 100 °F or 37.8 °C. The record low is −14 °F or −25.6 °C, set on February 13, 1967, while the record high is 104 °F or 40 °C, set on July 3, 1966.

Precipitation averages 45.99 inches or 1,170 millimetres annually, and is somewhat evenly distributed throughout the year, though March and December are the wettest months in terms of total precipitation. Snowfall averages 31.8 inches or 0.81 metres per year, falling almost entirely from November to April.

On August 12 and 13, 2014, a new 24-hour precipitation record for the state of New York was set at 13.57 inches (344.7 mm), including 1.08 inches or 27.4 millimetres in 9 minutes during the morning of August 12. This caused flooding on the Southern State Parkway, Sunrise Highway and other thoroughfares in the area.

Climate data for Islip, New York (Long Island MacArthur Airport), 1991–2020 normals, (Note: Mean monthly maxima and minima (i.e. the expected highest and lowest temperature readings at any point during the year or given month) calculated based on data at said location from 1991 to 2020.) extremes 1963–present
| Month | Jan | Feb | Mar | Apr | May | Jun | Jul | Aug | Sep | Oct | Nov | Dec | Year |
|---|---|---|---|---|---|---|---|---|---|---|---|---|---|
| Record high °F (°C) | 69 (21) | 71 (22) | 82 (28) | 94 (34) | 98 (37) | 101 (38) | 104 (40) | 100 (38) | 94 (34) | 89 (32) | 80 (27) | 77 (25) | 104 (40) |
| Mean maximum °F (°C) | 58.2 (14.6) | 57.1 (13.9) | 66.7 (19.3) | 77.0 (25.0) | 85.8 (29.9) | 90.4 (32.4) | 94.0 (34.4) | 91.2 (32.9) | 86.0 (30.0) | 78.6 (25.9) | 68.8 (20.4) | 60.9 (16.1) | 95.6 (35.3) |
| Mean daily maximum °F (°C) | 39.2 (4.0) | 41.0 (5.0) | 47.7 (8.7) | 58.3 (14.6) | 68.3 (20.2) | 77.2 (25.1) | 82.8 (28.2) | 81.4 (27.4) | 74.8 (23.8) | 64.1 (17.8) | 53.6 (12.0) | 44.4 (6.9) | 61.1 (16.2) |
| Daily mean °F (°C) | 31.9 (−0.1) | 33.3 (0.7) | 39.9 (4.4) | 49.7 (9.8) | 59.5 (15.3) | 69.0 (20.6) | 75.0 (23.9) | 73.7 (23.2) | 66.9 (19.4) | 55.7 (13.2) | 45.6 (7.6) | 37.1 (2.8) | 53.1 (11.7) |
| Mean daily minimum °F (°C) | 24.6 (−4.1) | 25.5 (−3.6) | 32.0 (0.0) | 41.2 (5.1) | 50.8 (10.4) | 60.9 (16.1) | 67.3 (19.6) | 66.0 (18.9) | 58.9 (14.9) | 47.3 (8.5) | 37.6 (3.1) | 29.8 (−1.2) | 45.2 (7.3) |
| Mean minimum °F (°C) | 7.4 (−13.7) | 9.8 (−12.3) | 17.0 (−8.3) | 28.8 (−1.8) | 37.9 (3.3) | 48.4 (9.1) | 57.7 (14.3) | 55.7 (13.2) | 45.4 (7.4) | 33.0 (0.6) | 22.9 (−5.1) | 15.8 (−9.0) | 5.4 (−14.8) |
| Record low °F (°C) | −8 (−22) | −14 (−26) | 0 (−18) | 16 (−9) | 32 (0) | 42 (6) | 49 (9) | 45 (7) | 38 (3) | 23 (−5) | 11 (−12) | −1 (−18) | −14 (−26) |
| Average precipitation inches (mm) | 3.66 (93) | 3.29 (84) | 4.51 (115) | 4.06 (103) | 3.28 (83) | 4.00 (102) | 3.26 (83) | 4.24 (108) | 3.60 (91) | 3.97 (101) | 3.41 (87) | 4.71 (120) | 45.99 (1,168) |
| Average snowfall inches (cm) | 10.3 (26) | 9.4 (24) | 6.5 (17) | 0.6 (1.5) | 0.0 (0.0) | 0.0 (0.0) | 0.0 (0.0) | 0.0 (0.0) | 0.0 (0.0) | 0.0 (0.0) | 0.5 (1.3) | 4.5 (11) | 31.8 (81) |
| Average extreme snow depth inches (cm) | 6.6 (17) | 6.4 (16) | 3.7 (9.4) | 0.5 (1.3) | 0.0 (0.0) | 0.0 (0.0) | 0.0 (0.0) | 0.0 (0.0) | 0.0 (0.0) | 0.0 (0.0) | 0.2 (0.51) | 3.0 (7.6) | 11.3 (29) |
| Average precipitation days (≥ 0.01 in) | 11.1 | 9.9 | 10.8 | 11.3 | 11.6 | 10.1 | 9.1 | 8.9 | 8.6 | 9.2 | 9.6 | 11.8 | 122.0 |
| Average snowy days (≥ 0.1 in) | 3.8 | 3.7 | 2.7 | 0.3 | 0.0 | 0.0 | 0.0 | 0.0 | 0.0 | 0.0 | 0.3 | 2.6 | 13.4 |
Source: NOAA

== Demographics ==
Historical population
| Census | Pop. | Note | %± |
|---|---|---|---|
| 1790 | 609 | | — |
| 1800 | 958 | | 57.3% |
| 1810 | 885 | | −7.6% |
| 1820 | 1,156 | | 30.6% |
| 1830 | 1,653 | | 43.0% |
| 1840 | 1,909 | | 15.5% |
| 1850 | 2,602 | | 36.3% |
| 1860 | 3,845 | | 47.8% |
| 1870 | 4,597 | | 19.6% |
| 1880 | 6,453 | | 40.4% |
| 1890 | 8,783 | | 36.1% |
| 1900 | 12,545 | | 42.8% |
| 1910 | 18,346 | | 46.2% |
| 1920 | 20,709 | | 12.9% |
| 1930 | 33,194 | | 60.3% |
| 1940 | 51,182 | | 54.2% |
| 1950 | 71,465 | | 39.6% |
| 1960 | 172,959 | | 142.0% |
| 1970 | 278,880 | | 61.2% |
| 1980 | 298,897 | | 7.2% |
| 1990 | 299,587 | | 0.2% |
| 2000 | 322,612 | | 7.7% |
| 2010 | 335,543 | | 4.0% |
| 2020 | 339,938 | | 1.3% |
U.S. Decennial Census

At the 2000 census, there were 322,612 people, 98,936 households and 78,555 families residing in the town. The population density was 3,064.5 inhabitants per square mile (1,183.2/km^{2}). There were 104,278 housing units at an average density of 990.5 per square mile (382.4/km^{2}). The racial makeup of the town was 77.25% White, 9.02% Black or African American, 0.26% Native American, 2.17% Asian, 0.05% Pacific Islander, 8.32% from other races, and 2.93% from two or more races. Hispanic or Latino of any race were 20.16% of the population.

There were 98,936 households, of which 39.4% had children under the age of 18 living with them, 62.4% were married couples living together, 12.3% had a female householder with no husband present, and 20.6% were non-families. 16.2% of all households were made up of individuals, and 6.4% had someone living alone who was 65 years of age or older. The average household size was 3.22 and the average family size was 3.55.

27.4% of the population were under the age of 18, 8.1% from 18 to 24, 32.4% from 25 to 44, 22.2% from 45 to 64, and 9.9% who were 65 years of age or older. The median age was 35 years. For every 100 females, there were 96.7 males. For every 100 females age 18 and over, there were 93.1 males.

According to a 2006 estimate, the median household income was $78,991, and the median family income was $86,190. Males had a median income of $49,069 versus $33,660 for females. The per capita income for the town was $29,699. About 4.1% of families and 6.2% of the population were below the poverty line, including 7.9% of those under age 18 and 7.0% of those age 65 or over.

== Government ==
Islip is governed by a Town Supervisor, an elected position which is similar to that of a Mayor, and four elected council members. Additionally, a Town Clerk and Receiver of Taxes are both duly elected. All of the elected officials serve staggered four year terms. Elections are held on odd years, except when special elections are held pursuant to state law. The current supervisor is Angie Carpenter, a Republican, who was formerly the Suffolk County Treasurer. Carpenter succeeded Tom Croci after he was elected to the New York State Senate in 2015.

The town board has jurisdiction over governmental affairs within the town's boundaries, excluding incorporated villages which have their own local governments. Such things include passing a budget and enacting new laws.

The town had a long history of control by the Republican Party; punctuated by two years in 1967. In 1969, the Republicans returned to local power for another 38 years until the 2007 elections gave the Democrats control of the town board. In 2006, Republican Supervisor Peter McGowan resigned due to charges of misuse of campaign funds. In the ensuing special election Phil Nolan, a Democrat, won the supervisor seat. The next year in 2007 Supervisor Nolan ran for his first full term in office with running mates John Edwards and Gene Parrington. All three were elected town-wide and the three Democrats took control of the Town Board for the first time since 1967.

In 2009, new voter registration skewed slightly towards the Democratic Party for the first time in the history of the Town of Islip.

In the 2009 elections, Islip Republicans gained one seat with the election of former News 12 personality Trish Bergin, and the re-election of Councilman Steven Flotteron; this left the Democrats with a one-seat majority.

The 2011 election witnessed the continued comeback of the Republican Party in Islip. Thomas Croci – a veteran running in his first election – led an energized campaign that upset incumbent Supervisor Nolan. In addition, the rest of the Republican ticket was swept into office. Anthony Senft Jr. and John Cochrane Jr. became councilmen, replacing Gene Parrington and John Edwards. Olga Murray became Town Clerk, and Alexis Weik became Receiver of Taxes.

In 2018, four residents sued the town for violating the Voting Rights Act of 1965 by maintaining a discriminatory at-large council system. One-third of Islip's population is Hispanic, but only one non-Non-Hispanic White person, at the time, had ever been elected to a town seat. As part of the settlement reached in 2020, the at-large system was abolished, and was replaced in 2023 by four council districts. In 2021, four councilmanic districts were created. Jorge Guadron, a Salvadoran American, won the election for councilmanic district one, which includes North Bay Shore, Brentwood, and areas of Central Islip. Guadron is the first ever minority elected to the Town Council since the Town of Islip's founding in 1683.

== Economy ==
NBTY is based in Ronkonkoma. Sigma Corporation is based in Ronkonkoma.

The town-owned Town of Islip Foreign Trade Zone is located within Ronkonkoma, adjacent to Long Island MacArthur Airport.

== Communities and locations ==
Note: ✝ Denotes area is on Fire Island

=== Villages (incorporated) ===
- Brightwaters
- Islandia
- Ocean Beach ✝
- Saltaire ✝

=== Hamlets (unincorporated) ===
- Bay Shore
- Bayport
- Baywood
- Bohemia
- Brentwood
- Captree (partially; with the Town of Babylon)
- Central Islip
- East Islip
- Great River
- Hauppauge (partially; with the Town of Smithtown)
- Holbrook (partially; with the Town of Brookhaven)
- Holtsville (partially; with the Town of Brookhaven)
- Islip
- Islip Terrace
- Kismet ✝
- Lake Ronkonkoma (partially; with the Towns of Brookhaven and Smithtown)
- Lonelyville ✝
- North Bay Shore
- North Great River
- Oakdale
- Ronkonkoma (partially; with the Town of Brookhaven)
- Sayville
- West Bay Shore
- West Islip
- West Sayville

=== Other communities ===
- Atlantique ✝
- Captree
- Corneille Estates ✝
- Dunewood ✝
- East Fire Island (Middle Island)
- Edgewood (Brentwood ZIP code)
- Fair Harbor ✝
- Lakeland (Ronkonkoma ZIP code)
- Robbins Rest ✝
- Seaview ✝
- Sexton Island
- West Fire Island (Thompson's Island)

=== State parks ===
- Bayard Cutting Arboretum State Park
- Brentwood State Park
- Connetquot River State Park Preserve
- Heckscher State Park
- Robert Moses State Park

== Transportation ==
=== Airports ===
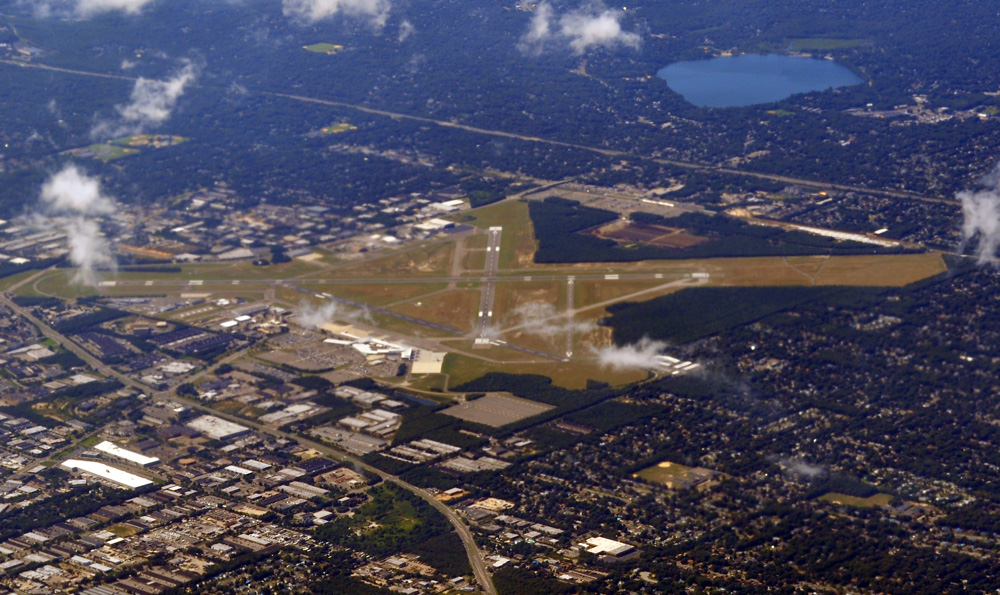
Long Island MacArthur Airport from the air in 2010.

Long Island MacArthur Airport and the New York Air Route Traffic Control Center (ARTCC), located in the Town of Islip, are both in the hamlet of Ronkonkoma. MacArthur Airport is owned by the Town of Islip and maintained through the Town of Islip Department of Aviation.

A smaller rural airport known as Bayport Aerodrome also exists within the town used for antique aircraft. It is also owned by the Town of Islip.

=== Rail ===
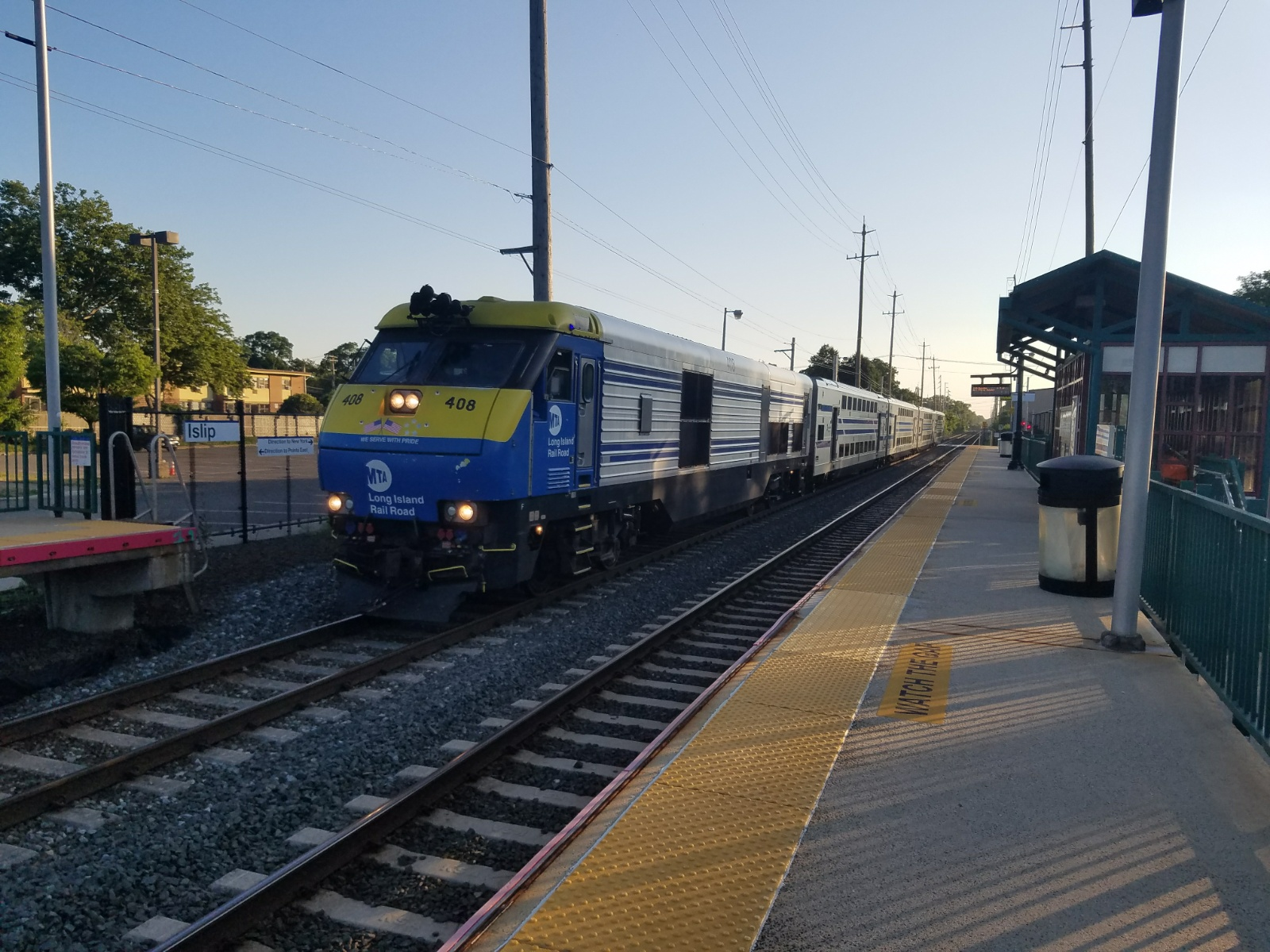
An eastbound Montauk Branch LIRR train at the Islip station in 2022.

The Long Island Rail Road's Montauk Branch is one of two lines running through the town spanning between the Village of Babylon and the Hamlet of Blue Point in the Town of Brookhaven, with stations from Bay Shore through Sayville. The other line is the Main Line which runs through the northern part of the town with stations in Brentwood, Central Islip and Ronkonkoma, which not only serves as a major transportation hub, but is also located on the Islip-Brookhaven Town Line.

=== Bus ===
The Town of Islip is served entirely by Suffolk County Transit bus routes.

=== Major roads ===
- I-495 is the Long Island Expressway, and the sole interstate highway in the Town of Islip. It runs along the northern portion of the town between Exit 53 in Brentwood and east of Exit 59 in Ronkonkoma.
- Southern State Parkway, enters the Town of Islip from the Town of Babylon, and has interchanges at Robert Moses Causeway (Exit 40), Suffolk CR 57 (Exit 41 W-E), and Sagtikos State Parkway (Exit 41A). Trucks are forbidden from using the parkway, as with most parkways on Long Island.
- Heckscher State Parkway, is a continuation of Southern State Parkway leading west to east then curving south to Heckscher State Park in Great River.
- Sagtikos State Parkway, is the main south-to-north parkway leading from Southern State and Heckscher Parkways in West Islip through the Long Island Expressway where it crosses the Islip-Smithtown Town Line.
- Robert Moses Causeway is a south-to-north parkway leading from Robert Moses State Park to Southern State Parkway.
  The Robert Moses Causeway – linking Fire Island with Jones Beach Island, Captree Island, and Long Island – crosses the Great South Bay
- Ocean Parkway runs across Jones Beach Island and terminates at Captree State Park.
- NY 27 is Sunrise Highway, the other limited-access highway in the town that does not forbid trucks.
- NY 27A is Montauk Highway west of Connetquot River State Park.
- CR 67, the remaining drivable portion of the Long Island Motor Parkway
- CR 85 is Montauk Highway east of Connetquot River State Park.
- CR 93 is a four-lane south-north highway running from the northwestern edge of Sayville to the south and west side of Lake Ronkonkoma.
- CR 97 (Nicoll's Road) is a partially limited-access highway in southeastern Islip.
- NY 111 is the south-to-north state route that runs from the Hamlet of Islip through Hauppauge into the Town of Smithtown.
- NY 231 runs along the Babylon-Islip town line as the unfinished Babylon-Northport Expressway before curving to the northwest and entering the Town of Babylon entirely.
- NY 454 is a west-east divided highway known as the Veterans' Memorial Highway, which runs northwest to southeast from Commack to NY 27 west of Suffolk CR 97 in Holbrook. Within the town it runs from NY 347 at the Islip-Smithtown Town Line and serves as the address for Long Island MacArthur Airport.

=== Ferries ===
Passenger ferries depart to Fire Island from Bay Shore and Sayville, which lead to communities both in the Towns of Islip and Brookhaven. Bay Shore has terminals for Fire Island ferries, serving Atlantique, Dunewood, Fair Harbor, Kismet, Ocean Bay Park, Ocean Beach, Saltaire, and Seaview, and smaller hamlets. They are located at the southernmost end of Maple Avenue. Some daily ferries to Atlantique also make a stop at the Bay Shore Marina, which is across the canal from the Maple Avenue ferries.

Sayville's ferry terminals lead to the communities of Cherry Grove and Fire Island Pines, both popular vacation communities for LGBT New Yorkers, as well as to Sailors Haven, which is located within the Sunken Forest Visitor Center.

== See also ==
- National Register of Historic Places listings in Islip (town), New York
- List of towns in New York
