= Robert Moses State Park (disambiguation) =

Robert Moses State Park can refer to two state parks in New York:

- Robert Moses State Park (Long Island) on Fire Island, on the southern shore of Long Island
- Robert Moses State Park (Thousand Islands) on the Saint Lawrence River in northern New York

== See also ==
- Robert Moses Playground a city park in New York City
- Robert Moses (disambiguation)
