= Oak Beach Inn =

Nightclub in New York, United States

Coordinates: 40°38′22.08″N 73°17′14.08″W

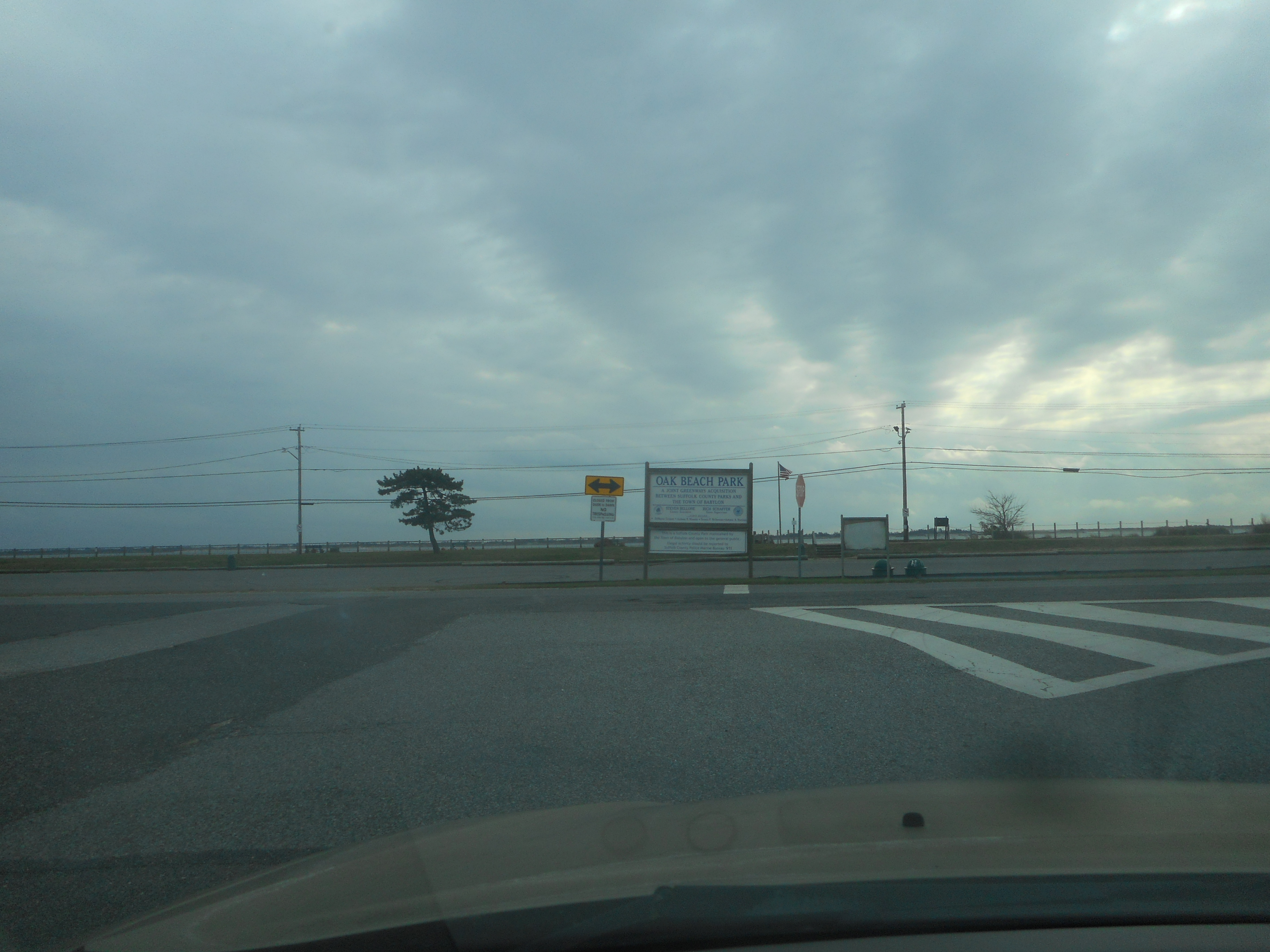
The site of the former Oak Beach Inn, now a Town of Babylon park.

The Oak Beach Inn, commonly referred to by the abbreviation OBI, was a Long Island nightclub located in Oak Beach, on Jones Beach Island near Captree State Park in the Town of Babylon, Suffolk County, New York.

== History and controversy ==
In 1969, Robert Matherson bought what was then a waterfront barrier island restaurant and converted it into an enormously popular (and controversial) nightclub. The Oak Beach Inn, located in Oak Beach on Jones Beach Island, was the original, and later just referred to as The OBI. He later opened three more OBI nightclubs and named them according to their geographic location. The OBI North was in Smithtown, New York, the OBI East near the Shinnecock Canal en route to The Hamptons, and the OBI West locations in Island Park, New York (which had two locations: first at 3999 Long Beach Road, and later, briefly, at 50 Broadway). All four clubs were located on Long Island and were wildly successful for many years, bringing people in from all over Long Island, New York City, Westchester, southern Connecticut and New Jersey and hosting acts such as Twisted Sister and The Good Rats.

In 1979, Matherson sued the town to lease him more land for additional parking, which the town granted. However two years later, new officials disagreed, which caused Matherson to sue again, and when the court favored with Matherson, the town granted him $3 million and the nine acres. In 1993, an unhappy Matherson started a "Move Out of New York Before It's Too Late" campaign complete with a hearse, banners and TV ads. An article in 1993 in The New York Times provided details about his campaign, including information that the New York State Division of Alcoholic Beverage Control raided the club one year earlier in 1992. One of the OBI West locations burned down after only a couple of years of packing in thousands on the weekends. Arson involving organized crime figures referred to in the movie Goodfellas was alleged but never substantiated.

=== Closure ===
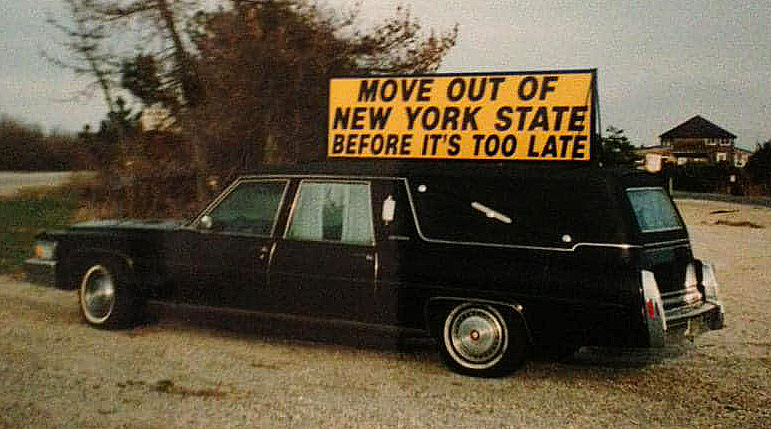
OBI Hearse with Famous Quote from Bob Matherson on top

Over the years, the OBI was involved in many disputes with the local community over issues such as noise, parking and traffic. Finally, in 1999, Matherson sold the property to developer Ross Cassata, who planned to build condominiums. Matherson then moved to Key West, Florida to open a new club of the same name. When it closed, the inn's two-ton statues of whales and dolphins, which were commonly touched by clubgoers, were moved to Danfords on the Sound in Long Island.

However, Cassata then sold the nine acres to Suffolk County for $7.95 million and the original property was torn down in 2003 and was replaced with a town-operated park, with later plans of adding a bed and breakfast, upscale restaurant, boardwalk, water-sport area and boat ramp. The park now hosts activities, such as car racing, and it too has caused controversy. At the time of demolition, the Suffolk County Legislator commented that the park agreement avoided "an enormous tax increase in Babylon, which would have had to pay a court judgment of as much as $20 million or watch its coastline be forever scarred by high-rise development" and the money came from the county's greenway program.

== Locations ==
The original OBI was at 1 Oak Beach Road. The building was sold in 1999, torn down in 2003, land turned into a park with a small beach simply called Oak Beach.

The OBI East was at 239 E Montauk Highway, Hampton Bays. The property underwent extensive renovations between 2018 and 2022 and was reopened as the Canoe Place Inn and Cottages with 20 rooms, 5 cottages, restaurant, bar and a 350 banquet room.

The OBI North was at State Road 25A, near Jericho Turnpike, Smithtown. The building burned down in 1980, and the land is now part of Willow Ridge at Smithtown HOA.

The OBI West was at 3999 Long Beach Road, Island Park. The building was torn down between 1994 and 2004, the land is now a parking lot for school buses. It briefly was located at 50 Broadway (sometimes listed as 50 Austin Blvd.), Island Park as one of a series of famous nightclubs such as the Shell House, The Action House, The Rock Pile, and Speaks.

Robert Matherson later opened Oak Beach Inn at 227 Duval Street, Key West, Florida. Robert Matherson died in 2007.

== In popular culture ==
Robert "Rosebud" Butt is credited with inventing the Long Island iced tea, while working as a bartender at the original OBI in the 1970s.

In 2010, the Babylon-based rock band Two Cent Sam released the "OBI Song" and a DIY video celebrating the Oak Beach Inn's history and impact on Long Islanders and the void in Long Island night life after the OBI's destruction.

== Bibliography ==
- Matherson, Robert (October 1998). Scandal at the Oak Beach Inn: Political Corruption Vs. Long Island's Hottest Nightclub. Barricade Books. ISBN 1569801339.
