= West Bay Shore, New York =

- Hamlet and census-designated place
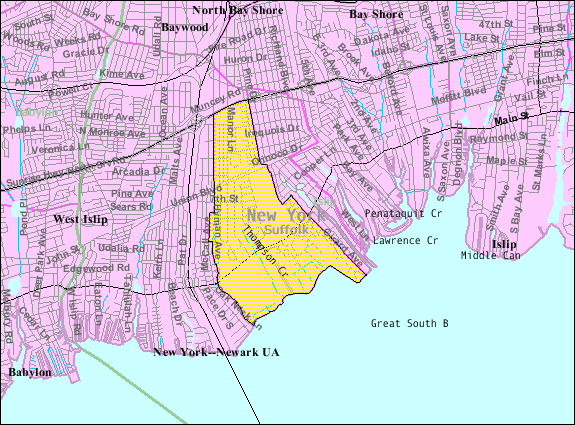
- U.S. Census map

- Location within the state of New York
- Coordinates: 40°42′46″N 73°16′31″W
- Country: United States
- State: New York
- County: Suffolk

Area
  - Total: 5.41 sq mi (14.00 km^{2})
  - Land: 2.18 sq mi (5.65 km^{2})
  - Water: 3.22 sq mi (8.35 km^{2})
- Elevation: 13 ft (4 m)

Population (2020)
  - Total: 4,625
  - Density: 2,118.3/sq mi (817.89/km^{2})
- Time zone: UTC-5 (Eastern (EST))
  - Summer (DST): UTC-4 (EDT)
- ZIP code: 11706
- Area code: 631
- FIPS code: 36-79301
- GNIS feature ID: 0969094

West Bay Shore is a hamlet and census-designated place (CDP) in the Town of Islip, Suffolk County, New York, United States. As of the 2020 census, West Bay Shore had a population of 4,625.

== History ==
Sagtikos Manor is one of the oldest structures in the Town of Islip. The original structure, which was later expanded, was built in 1697 by New York City's first native-born mayor, Stephanus Van Cortlandt. The manor functioned for a time, during the American Revolution, as local headquarters for British forces under General Sir Henry Clinton. George Washington used it as a stopover during a 1790 tour of Long Island. It was added to the National Register of Historic Places in 1976.

== Geography ==
According to the United States Census Bureau, the CDP has a total area of 2.3 square miles (5.9 km^{2}), of which 2.2 square miles (5.7 km^{2}) is land and 0.08 square miles (0.2 km^{2}), or 4.12%, is water.

== Demographics ==
Historical population
Census	Pop.	Note	%±
2020	4,625		—
U.S. Decennial Census

=== 2020 census ===
As of the 2020 census, West Bay Shore had a population of 4,625. The median age was 48.4 years. 18.9% of residents were under the age of 18 and 24.0% of residents were 65 years of age or older. For every 100 females there were 94.7 males, and for every 100 females age 18 and over there were 89.4 males age 18 and over.

99.8% of residents lived in urban areas, while 0.2% lived in rural areas.

There were 1,742 households in West Bay Shore, of which 27.2% had children under the age of 18 living in them. Of all households, 59.4% were married-couple households, 10.7% were households with a male householder and no spouse or partner present, and 25.0% were households with a female householder and no spouse or partner present. About 21.1% of all households were made up of individuals and 14.6% had someone living alone who was 65 years of age or older.

There were 1,809 housing units, of which 3.7% were vacant. The homeowner vacancy rate was 1.4% and the rental vacancy rate was 6.8%.

Racial composition as of the 2020 census
Race	Number	Percent
White	3,807	82.3%
Black or African American	142	3.1%
American Indian and Alaska Native	4	0.1%
Asian	139	3.0%
Native Hawaiian and Other Pacific Islander	0	0.0%
Some other race	191	4.1%
Two or more races	342	7.4%
Hispanic or Latino (of any race)	495	10.7%

=== 2000 census ===
As of the census of 2000, there were 4,775 people, 1,721 households, and 1,366 families residing in the CDP. The population density was 1,996.9 inhabitants per square mile (771.0/km^{2}). There were 1,789 housing units at an average density of 748.2 per square mile (288.9/km^{2}). The racial makeup of the CDP was 94.62% White, 0.94% African American, 0.17% Native American, 2.20% Asian, 0.92% from other races, and 1.15% from two or more races. Hispanic or Latino of any race were 4.08% of the population.

There were 1,721 households, out of which 30.6% had children under the age of 18 living with them, 67.3% were married couples living together, 9.6% had a female householder with no husband present, and 20.6% were non-families. 16.5% of all households were made up of individuals, and 7.9% had someone living alone who was 65 years of age or older. The average household size was 2.76 and the average family size was 3.11.

In the CDP, the population was spread out, with 23.3% under the age of 18, 5.8% from 18 to 24, 27.0% from 25 to 44, 26.6% from 45 to 64, and 17.3% who were 65 years of age or older. The median age was 42 years. For every 100 females, there were 94.8 males. For every 100 females age 18 and over, there were 91.2 males.

The median income for a household in the CDP was $73,194, and the median income for a family was $75,055. Males had a median income of $61,635 versus $41,667 for females. The per capita income for the CDP was $31,998. About 3.1% of families and 4.6% of the population were below the poverty line, including 2.5% of those under age 18 and 6.4% of those age 65 or over.

== Education ==
The school district is the Bay Shore Union Free School District.
