= Jones Inlet =

Coordinates: 40°34′57″N 73°34′40″W

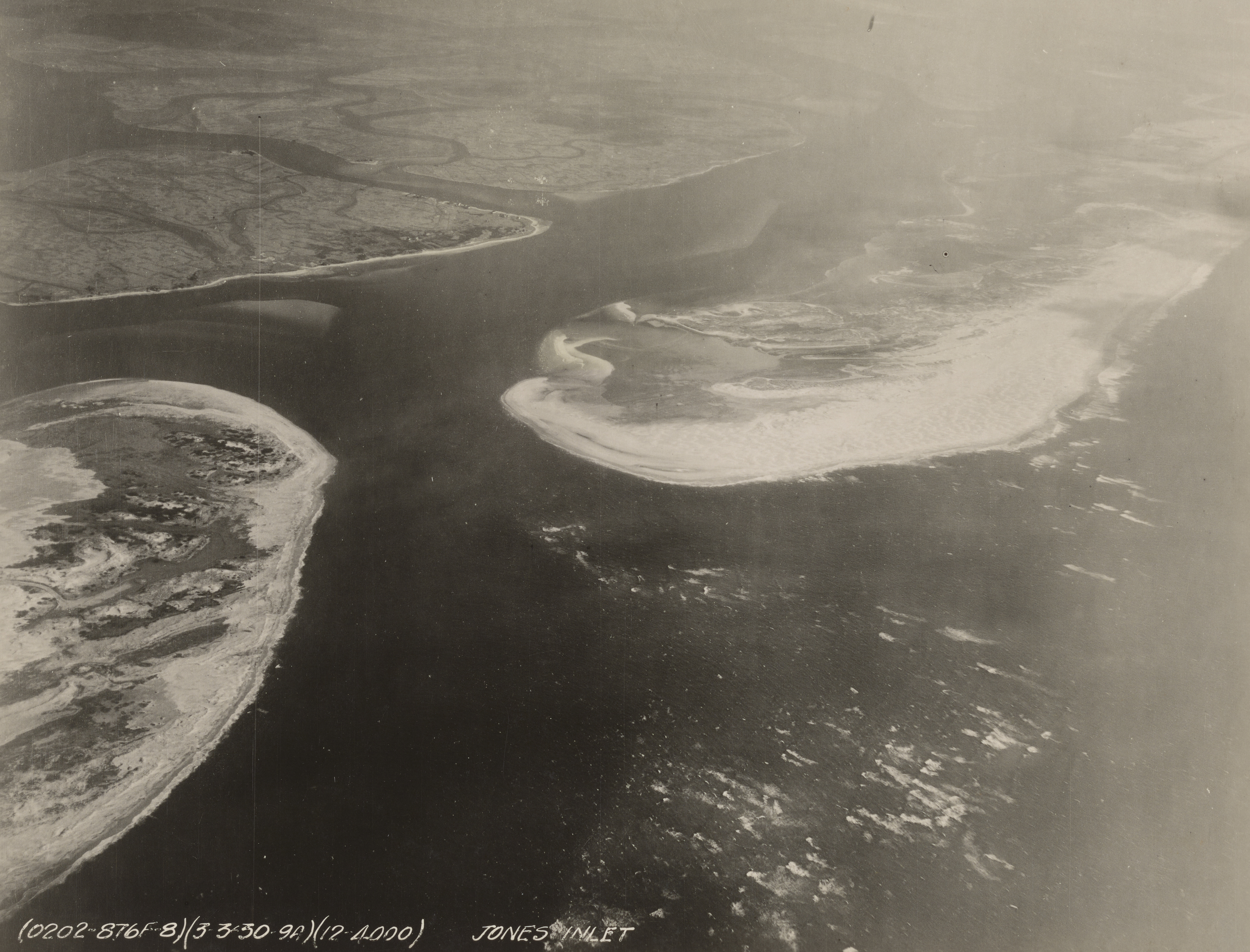
Jones Inlet in March 1930

Jones Inlet is located at the westernmost end of the 17-mile (27 km) long Jones Beach Barrier Island that runs along the South Shore of Long Island.

== Description ==
The inlet separates Jones Beach State Park's West End from the community of Point Lookout and connects South Oyster Bay with the Atlantic Ocean. In 2006, the inlet handled approximately 10,000 tons of commercial tonnage.

Shifting sand bars and shallow waters have made the inlet treacherous for boaters to navigate, which prompted New York State to allocate $7.6 million of funding for the United States Army Corps of Engineers to dredge the inlet in 2008. In addition to improving navigational safety for vessels, the sand dredged from the inlet was pumped onto the Point Lookout shoreline to help mitigate the effects of beach erosion. The inlet was previously dredged in 1995-1996. It was also dredged in 2014 and 2022.

The United States Coast Guard Station Jones Beach is located near the east side of the inlet on Jones Beach Island.

== See also ==
- Fire Island Inlet
- Rockaway Inlet
