= Cedar Beach (Babylon, New York) =

Beach in Babylon, New York, United States

Coordinates: 40.632527°N 73.33874°W

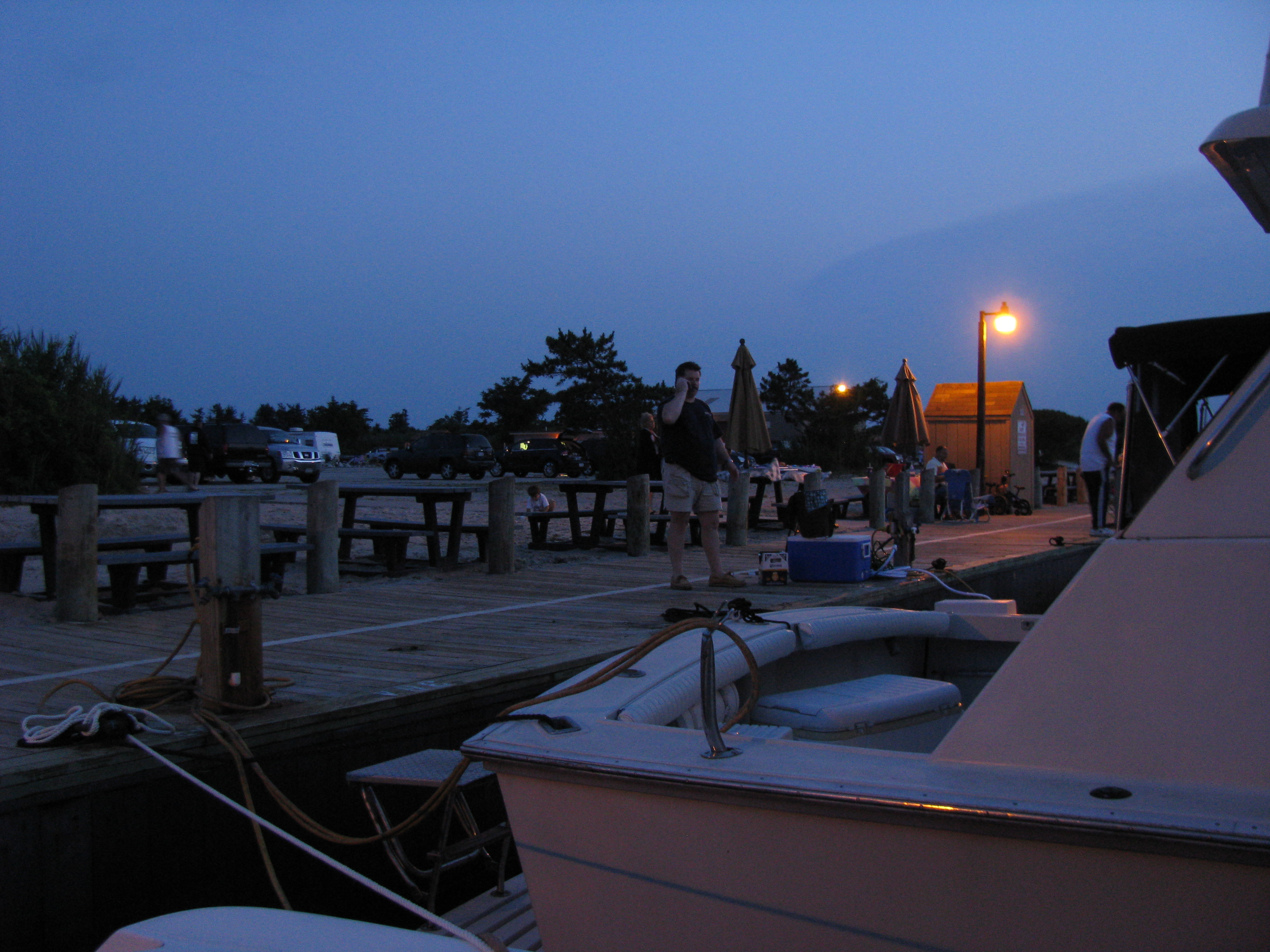
An east-facing view of the marina at Cedar Beach, south of Long Island, New York.

Cedar Beach is a public recreational beach of the Town of Babylon, in Suffolk County, New York. It is located on Jones Beach Island, a barrier island off of Long Island, between the populated places of Gilgo and Oak Beach. There are no residents.

The beach is open to town residents and the general public during the summer season. During this time, lifeguards are on duty on weekdays, weekends, and holidays. There are also limited preseason hours beginning Memorial Day weekend. Access to the beach is via Ocean Parkway. Free parking is available for town residents with recreation permits. Non-residents and residents without permits may pay a daily fee to park ($20 Monday through Thursday; $40 Friday through Sunday and holidays).

Cedar Beach features a playground, a picnic area with grills, a basketball court, a handball court, and numerous beach volleyball courts. Associated with the beach are a marina, a campground, and a golf/disc golf course. The town's September 11th memorial is located in the dunes here. Nearby is the New York Sportfishing Education Center, associated with Cornell Cooperative Extension. Located adjacent to Cedar Beach is Overlook Beach, another Town of Babylon beach; however, this beach is residents only.

Concessions at Cedar Beach have been managed by the Salt Shack since 2018.
