= Fire Island Inlet =

Coordinates: 40°37′49″N 73°18′31″W

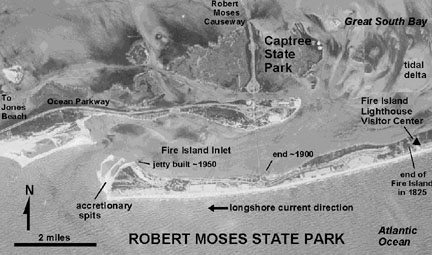
Map of Fire Island Inlet

Fire Island Inlet is an inlet on the south shore of Long Island, New York.

It connects the Great South Bay with the Atlantic Ocean, passing between Robert Moses State Park (the western end of Fire Island) on the south and Oak Beach and Captree State Park (the eastern end of Jones Beach Island) on the north. The inlet is directly south of West Islip, the nearest town on the main part of Long Island.

Fire Island Inlet has evolved over the years due to natural processes, especially longshore drift. Jones Island and Fire Island at one time were connected.

The Fire Island Light was at the mouth of the inlet when built in 1825, but is now five miles (8.0 km) east of the inlet.

The northwest side of the mouth of the inlet is known as the Sore Thumb, and is a man-made barrier that was created to try to combat the extensive erosion of the beaches inside the inlet. The southeast side of the mouth of the inlet is known as Democrat Point and is known as a popular surfing spot for beach goers, as well as a popular 4x4 fishing area. It is also the site of extensive preserves for the area's birds.
