= Robert Moses Causeway =

Highway on Long Island, New York

Robert Moses Causeway
- Robert Moses Causeway highlighted in red

Route information
- Maintained by NYSDOT and NYS OPRHP
- Length: 8.10 mi (13.04 km)
- Existed: 1951–present
- History: Completed in 1964
- Restrictions: No commercial vehicles north of exit RM1W

Major junctions
- South end: Robert Moses State Park on Fire Island
- Ocean Parkway at Captree State Park; NY 27A in West Islip; NY 27 in West Bay Shore
- North end: CR 57 / Southern State Parkway in Bay Shore

Location
- Country: United States
- State: New York
- Counties: Suffolk

Highway system
- New York Highways; Interstate; US; State; Reference; Parkways

The Robert Moses Causeway is an 8.10-mile (13.04 km) controlled-access parkway in Suffolk County, New York on Long Island. It is named for the builder and urban planner Robert Moses. The parkway, originally known as the Captree Causeway, connects West Islip on Long Island to the barrier beach islands, such as Captree Island, Jones Beach Island, and the western tip of Fire Island, to the south. It is designated New York State Route 908J (NY 908J), an unsigned reference route.

== Route description ==
Water tower and Robert Moses Causeway roundabout at Robert Moses State Park

The Robert Moses Causeway begins inside Robert Moses State Park, located on the western tip of Fire Island. From here, the parkway heads north across the Fire Island Inlet on the Fire Island Inlet Bridge as a two-lane freeway. On the north side of the inlet, the parkway becomes enters Captree State Park and approaches a cloverleaf interchange with Ocean Parkway. The parkway becomes a five-lane freeway with three northbound lanes and two southbound lanes in the vicinity of the junction.

The parkway then traverses the State Boat Channel Bridge by way of a 665-foot (203 m)-long bascule bridge modeled after the Mill Basin Drawbridge in Mill Basin, Brooklyn. The north foot of the bridge contains an unnumbered interchange to a private road on Captree Island, where the rest of the road is surrounded by protected land. On the section that crosses over the Great South Bay, via the Great South Bay Bridge, the New York City skyline can be faintly seen on a clear day. Originally a toll bridge, the remnants of the former toll plaza for the Great South Bay Bridge can be found on the north side in West Islip. At the cloverleaf interchange with NY 27A, the third northbound lane becomes the deceleration ramp, and from there the rest of the parkway is four lanes wide.

The parkway soon takes a slight northeastern turn and later rises to move over Union Boulevard (County Route 50 or CR 50), the Montauk Branch of the Long Island Rail Road, and Orinoco Drive with no access to either roads. Instead, another cloverleaf interchange is available at NY 27. The road remains elevated as it crosses over Muncey Road and then runs along the west side of Casamento Park, before approaching its northern terminus at the interchange with the Southern State Parkway. The north-to-eastbound ramp to the Southern State Parkway contains an interchange of its own with CR 57 (Bay Shore Road), because that ramp's traffic misses the Southern State's exit to CR 57. The other ramps exist on a partial cloverleaf just west of Bay Shore Road's interchange with the Southern State.

== History ==
The first sprawling trestle crossing from West Islip to Captree Island was completed in 1951. The structure is 3,206.2 metres (2.0 mi) in length with a middle clearance for boats of 18.2 metres (59.7 ft). Originally, one lane was for southbound traffic and the other for northbound traffic. In a bridge opening ceremony, the first car to drive over the bridge was a Suffolk County Sheriff's Office patrol vehicle. In 1967, a new span was built next to the original bridge, carrying three lanes of northbound traffic. The original bridge was reconfigured to carry southbound traffic.

The Fire Island Inlet span was completed in 1964. By 1985 a dual span was proposed to alleviate traffic, but it was never constructed. When first proposed in 1938, the span was to be a vertical-lift bridge with a design similar to that of the Marine Parkway–Gil Hodges Memorial Bridge. Later, the design of the Fire Island Bridge was changed to conform with that of the Great South Bay span, a 600-foot (180 m) steel-arch span with a 60-foot (18 m) clearance.

== Exit list ==
The entire route is in Suffolk County.

Location	mi	km	Exit	Destinations	Notes
Fire Island	0.00	0.00	–	Robert Moses State Park	Roundabout; southern terminus
Fire Island Inlet	0.10– 0.90	0.16– 1.45	Fire Island Inlet Bridge		
Captree State Park	1.03	1.66	–	Ocean Parkway – Jones Beach, Captree State Park	
State Boat Channel	1.35	2.17	State Boat Channel Bridge		
Captree Island	1.60	2.57	–	Captree Island	Exit contains ramps for reversing direction on the Causeway
Great South Bay	2.50– 4.50	4.02– 7.24	Great South Bay Bridge		
West Islip	5.25	8.45	RM2	NY 27A – Bay Shore, Babylon	Signed as exits RM2E (east) and RM2W (west); former NY 27
West Bay Shore	7.32	11.78	RM1	NY 27 – New York, Montauk	Signed as exits RM1E (east) and RM1W (west); exit 41 on NY 27; all trucks must exit
Bay Shore	7.80	12.55	–	Southern State Parkway west – New York	Northbound exit and southbound entrance; exit 40 on Southern State Parkway
Bay Shore	8.20	13.20	–	Bay Shore Road (CR 57)	Northbound exit and entrance
Bay Shore	8.50	13.68	–	Southern State Parkway east – East Islip	Northern terminus
1.000 mi = 1.609 km; 1.000 km = 0.621 mi: Incomplete access
