= Jones Beach Island =

Island in Nassau and Suffolk counties, New York, United States

Coordinates: 40.596234°N 73.507861°W

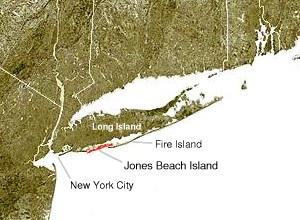
Jones Beach Island

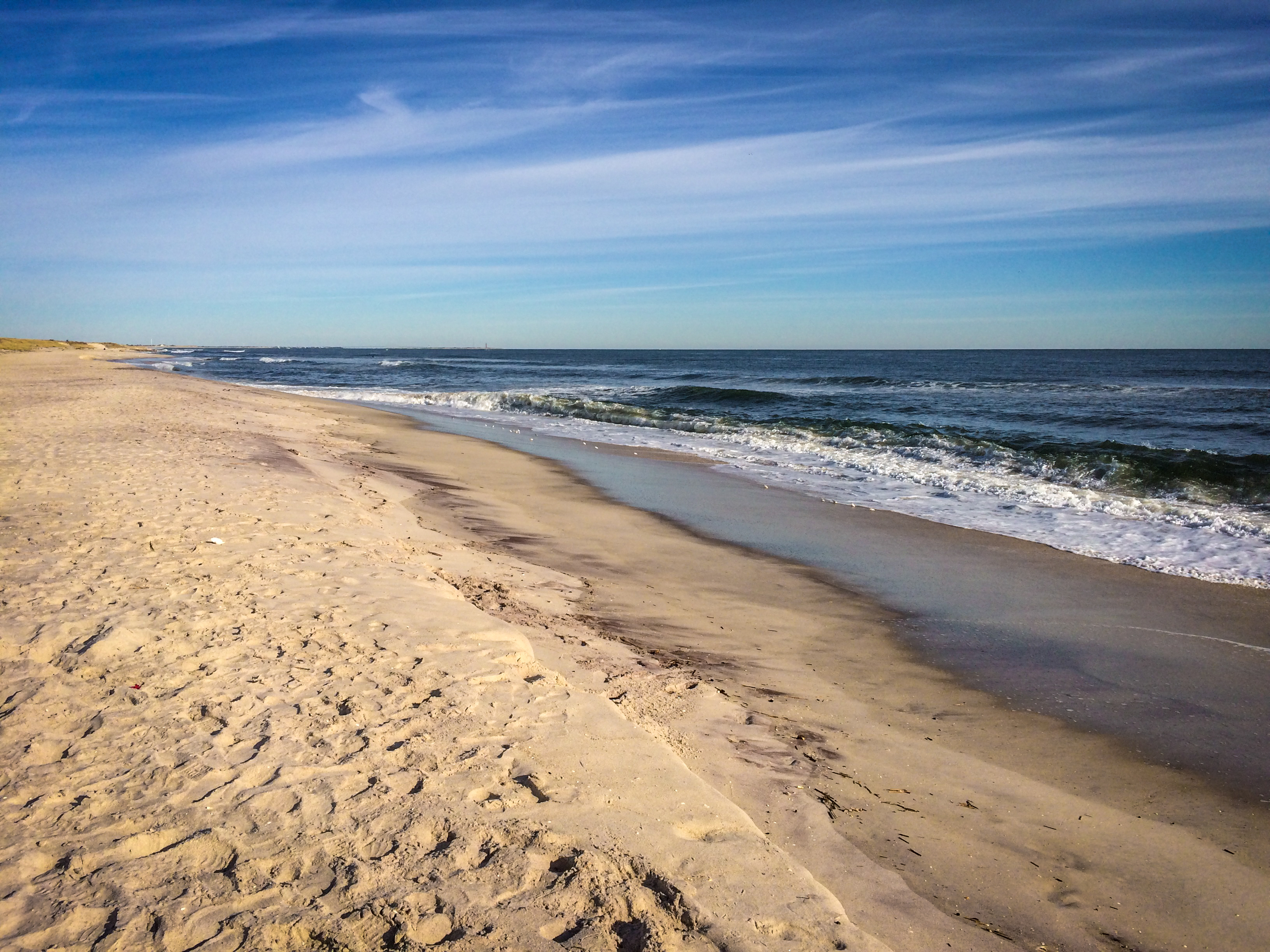
Gilgo Beach in March 2016

Jones Beach Island is one of the outer barrier islands off the southern coast of Long Island in the U.S. state of New York.

== Etymology ==
It is named for Major Thomas Jones, who first came to Long Island in 1692, where he proceeded to build the island's first brick house near Massapequa. Jones built a whaling station on Jones Island near the present site of Jones Beach State Park in 1700.

== Geography ==
Jones Beach Island is separated from Long Island by South Oyster Bay and Great South Bay, from Long Beach Barrier Island by Jones Inlet to the west, and from Fire Island by Fire Island Inlet to the east. It straddles the line between Nassau and Suffolk counties.

Jones Beach Island is sometimes referred to as Oak Beach Island and is the former home of the infamous Oak Beach Inn. Because of the ephemeral nature of the various inlets, the name Fire Island is sometimes used to refer collectively to the various barrier islands off the south shore of Long Island.

From west to east, Jones Beach Island contains the following communities and parks:

- Jones Beach State Park
- John F. Kennedy Memorial Wildlife Sanctuary, a Town of Oyster Bay wildlife preserve
- Tobay Beach, a Town of Oyster Bay beach
- Gilgo, a census-designated place
  - West Gilgo Beach, a private gated community
  - Gilgo Beach, a community and Town of Babylon beach
  - Cedar Beach, a Town of Babylon beach
  - Overlook Beach, a residents-only Town of Babylon beach
  - Gilgo State Park, an undeveloped beach
- Oak Beach, a census-designated place
- Captree, a census-designated place
  - Captree State Park

The southern side of the island is known for its beaches that face the open Atlantic Ocean. The best known of the public beaches on the island, Jones Beach State Park on the western tip of the island, is a summer recreational destination for the New York City area.

Jones Beach Island is accessible from Long Island on its western end by the Meadowbrook State Parkway to Merrick (with the Loop Parkway providing a spur to Long Beach), and the Wantagh State Parkway to Wantagh. The Robert Moses Causeway traverses its eastern end, linking to Babylon via the State Boat Channel Bridge and Great South Bay Bridge, as well as to Fire Island by the Fire Island Inlet Bridge. The Ocean Parkway connects all three causeways and runs the length of the island.
