= Captree State Park =

State park in New York, United States

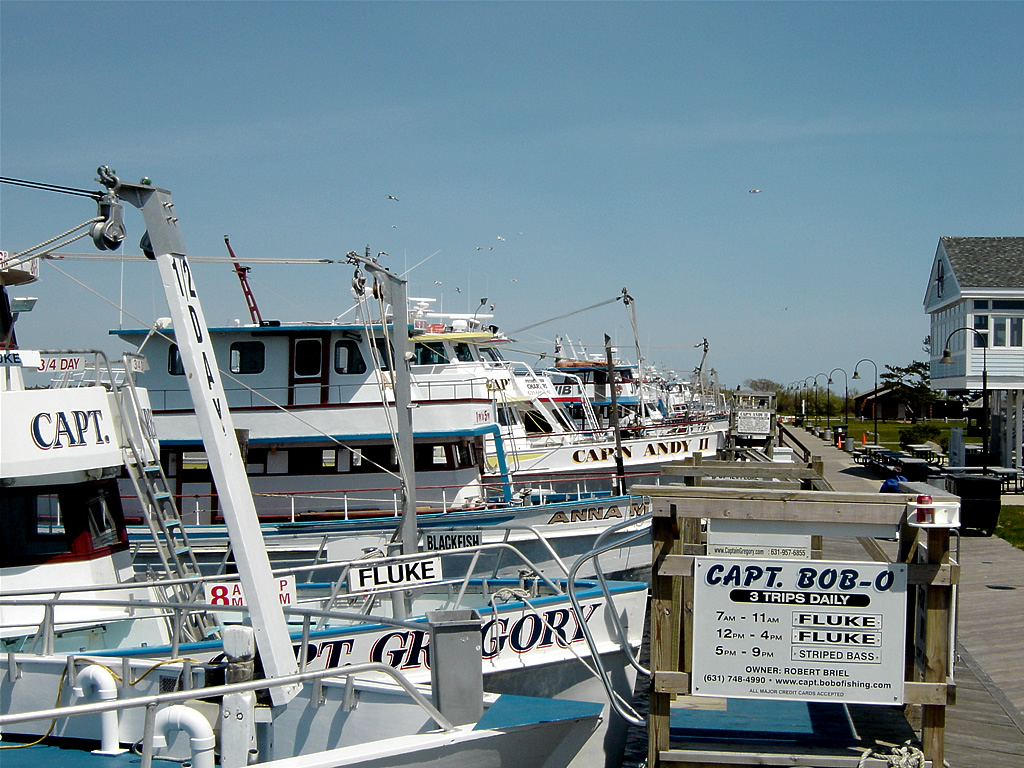
- Charter fishing boats at Captree State Park

- Location within New York
- Interactive map of Captree State Park
- Type: State park
- Location: 3500 East Ocean Parkway; Babylon, New York
- Coordinates: 40°38′24″N 73°15′18″W
- Area: 340 acres (1.4 km^{2})
- Created: 1954
- Operator: New York State Office of Parks, Recreation and Historic Preservation
- Visitors: 1,124,776 (in 2014)
- Open: All year
- Website: Captree State Park

Captree State Park is a 340-acre (1.4 km^{2}) state park located in the towns of Babylon and Islip in Suffolk County, New York, United States. The park is located south of Captree Island on the easternmost end of Jones Beach Island, and overlooks the Fire Island Inlet and the westernmost section of Fire Island.

Captree State Park can be accessed via the Robert Moses Causeway and the Ocean Parkway. The park primarily provides boating and fishing access to the Atlantic Ocean and Long Island's Great South Bay, and numerous charter boats are available for fishing excursions.

== Park description ==
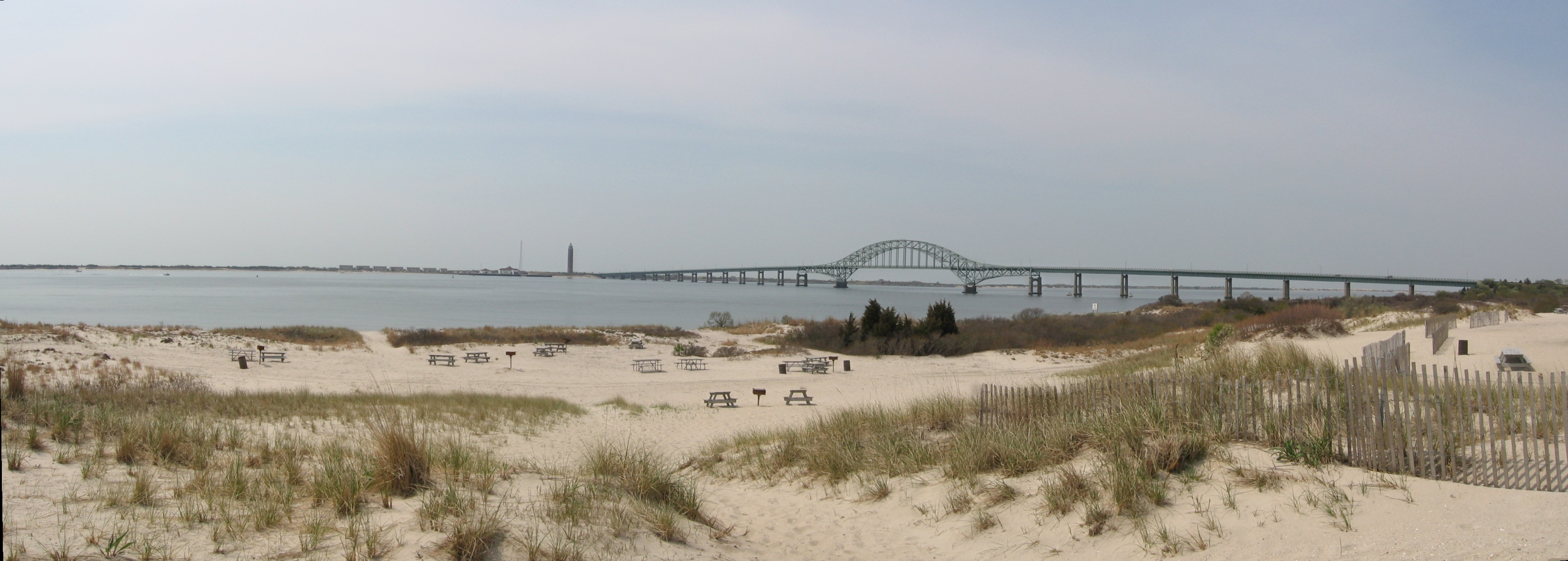
View from Captree State Park of the Robert Moses Causeway as it passes over Fire Island Inlet. The water tower for Robert Moses State Park can be seen in the distance.

Captree State Park is home to "The Captree Fleet", which comprises between 24 and 28 independently-owned charter boats that are available for fishing, scuba diving, sightseeing and excursion tours. The fleet is the largest public fishing fleet on Long Island. Anglers at or departing from the park typically target flounder, fluke, and sea bass.

The park also offers a marina and boat launch, picnic tables, a restaurant, a playground and recreation programs. Two piers are available for fishing and crabbing, and a put-in for kayaks is available for launching smaller watercraft.

The Fall Harvest and Seafood Festival is hosted each year at the park, in addition to several annual fishing tournaments and derbies. A free salt water fishing clinic is also held each year at the park by the New York State Department of Environmental Conservation and New York Sea Grant.

Like most New York State Parks, Captree charges entry fees for vehicles.

== See also ==
- List of New York state parks
