= Robert Moses State Park =

State park in New York, United States

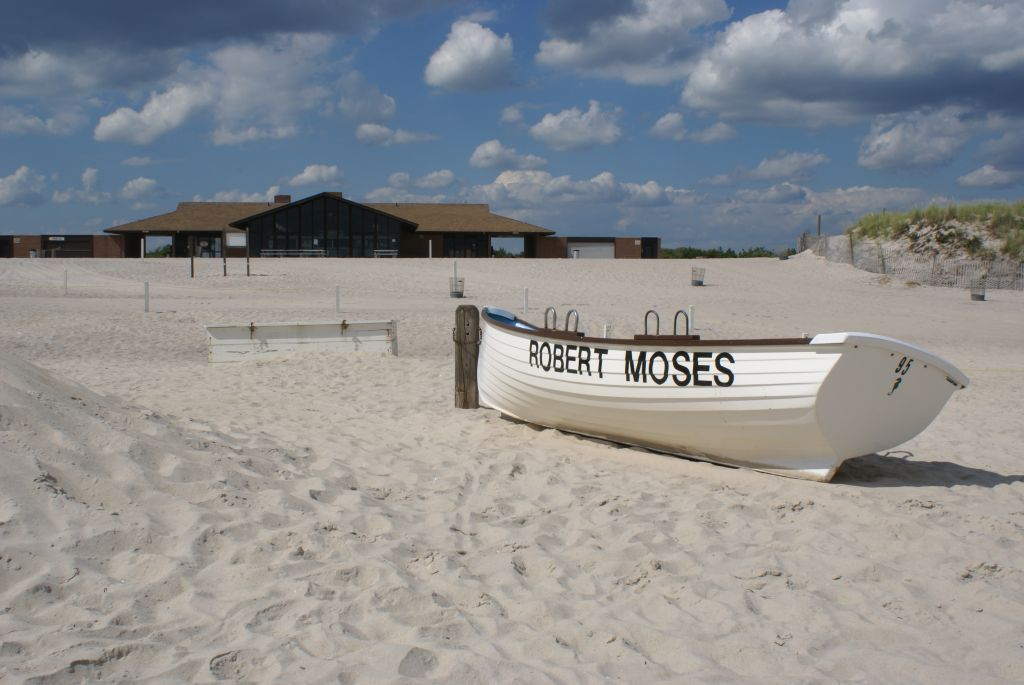
- A lifeboat on the beach at Robert Moses State Park

- Location within New York
- Type: State park
- Location: Fire Island, New York
- Nearest city: Babylon, New York
- Coordinates: 40°37′23″N 73°16′48″W
- Area: 875 acres (3.54 km^{2})
- Created: 1908
- Operator: New York State Office of Parks, Recreation and Historic Preservation
- Visitors: 3,937,825 (in 2024)
- Open: All year
- Website: Robert Moses State Park

Robert Moses State Park is a 875-acre (3.54 km^{2}) state park in southern Suffolk County, New York. The park lies on the western end of Fire Island, one of the central barrier islands off the southern coast of Long Island, and is known for its five-mile (8.0 km) stretch of beaches on the Atlantic Ocean. The park is accessible from Long Island by the Robert Moses Causeway across Great South Bay.

Established as Fire Island State Park in 1908, the park is the oldest state park on Long Island. It was renamed to honor Robert Moses, the influential mid-20th century urban planner and former president of the Long Island State Park Commission. Recently, some lawmakers have suggested the park should revert to its previous name or to something that better reflects its location.

== Park description ==
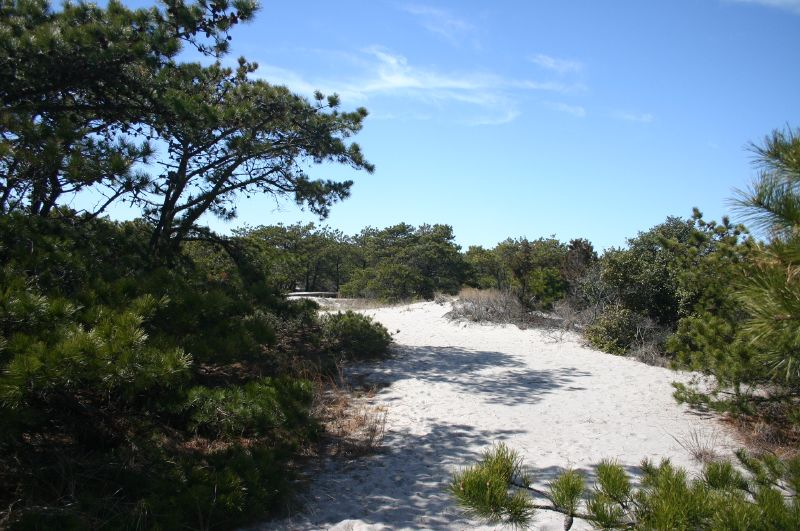
A path through the trees at Robert Moses State Park.

Robert Moses State Park includes five miles (8.0 km) of beach, which visitors can use for swimming, surfing, or fishing. Anglers may fish from either the beach or the piers. A day use boat basin that can accommodate up to 40 boats is also available. Guests can also use the four bathhouses on the property. The park also contains four concession stands (one at each field), volleyball courts, first aid stations, picnic areas, and a playground at Field 5.

On the west end of the park is an 18-hole pitch and putt golf course. The secluded course is set among native trees and beach vegetation. It is typically open April through November and equipment rental is available.

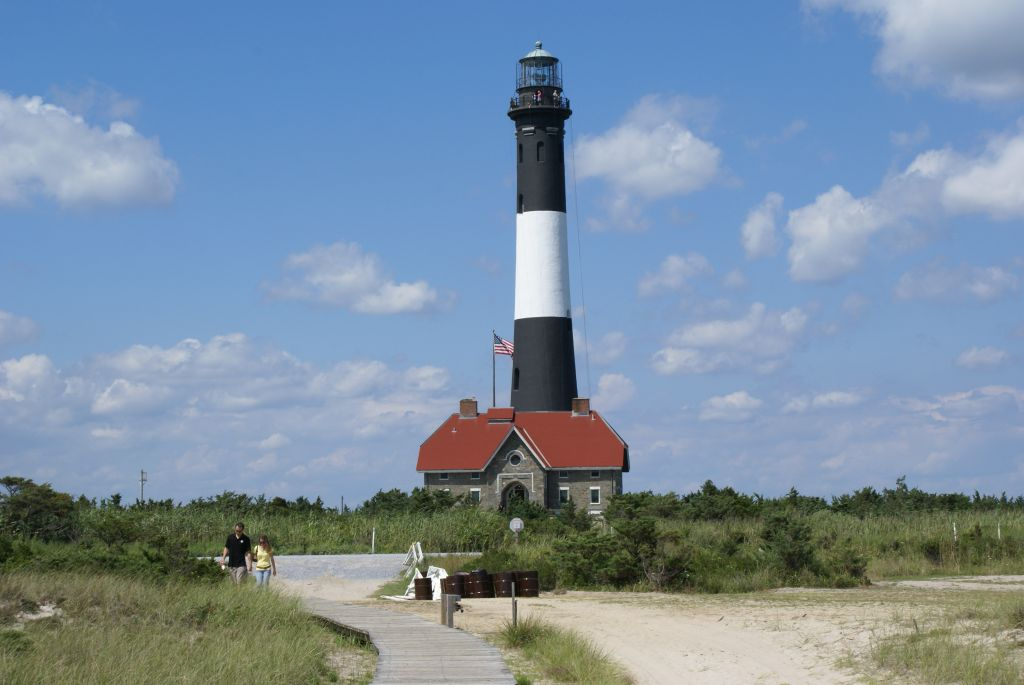
The Fire Island Lighthouse at the adjacent Fire Island National Seashore

Robert Moses State Park also facilitates access to the Fire Island National Seashore, immediately east of the park. Since there is no parking at the Seashore itself, many visitors park at Field 5 in order to walk to Lighthouse Beach, the Fire Island Lighthouse and Museum, or the nearby community of Kismet. In 2010, New York State officials estimated about 30% of the users of Field 5 park there to access Lighthouse Beach and the Lighthouse itself. Lighthouse Beach was historically a clothing optional beach; however, the National Park Service has enforced a ban on public nudity at Lighthouse Beach since 2013, citing concerns over increases in lewd behavior prior to the ban. Violators face a maximum penalty of a $5,000 fine and six months in prison.

=== Access and hours ===
The park is accessible by automobile from the Robert Moses Causeway, which connects Fire Island with mainland Long Island. Parking is available in four separate fields. Parking fields 2, 4 and 5 have a capacity of roughly 1,000 vehicles while the capacity at Field 3 is 500. Suffolk Transit's S47 route also serves the beach seasonally connecting it with the Babylon Long Island Rail Road station on the Babylon Branch.

The park is open year-round from sunrise to sunset, although hours for activities such as swimming and golfing vary by season. Portions of the park are open 24 hours a day to fishermen with the appropriate permit. There are many other permits you can buy, such as nighttime photography, stargazing, 4x4 beach permits, scuba diving, and many more.

Starting in early April, visitors are charged a fee for parking at the park. As of 2024, vehicle fees are $8 from 8 a.m. to 4 p.m. on weekends from early-April until Memorial Day, after which a $10 fee is charged from 7 a.m. to 6 p.m. on weekends and holidays, and a $10 fee is charged on weekdays from 8 a.m. to 4 p.m. After Labor Day weekend, vehicle fees are once again $8 from 8 a.m. to 4 p.m. on weekends only, until early-November when fees are no longer charged.

== History ==
Water tower and Robert Moses Causeway roundabout at Robert Moses State Park, with the Atlantic Ocean in the background

The west end of Fire Island was part of a colonial grant to William "Tangier" Smith. In 1825 the federal government acquired the westerly tip to build a lighthouse and David Sammis bought about 120 acres (0.49 km^{2}) to the east in 1855 and built the Surf Hotel.

In 1892, fears of a cholera epidemic spread by passengers on ships arriving in New York prompted the state to acquire the hotel property to establish a quarantine station. Irate local citizens obtained an injunction blocking the quarantine station and occupied the site despite the arrival of troops.

In 1908, Governor Charles Evans Hughes signed legislation designating the former Surf Hotel property as Long Island's first state park, known then as Fire Island State Park. The island and the park have grown since that time; for decades, sand has accumulated along Fire Island's western tip at a rate of 160 feet (50 m) per year, increasing the island's length by five miles (8.0 km) since 1825. At the time of the park's establishment, the island's western tip was near where the park's water tower stands.

A 1918 fire destroyed the boardwalk and the few buildings on the site. In 1924, the state established the Long Island State Park Commission headed by Robert Moses as part of a statewide park and parkway program, also run by Moses. The commission obtained from the federal government four miles (6.4 km) of beach west of the lighthouse that had been formed by shifting sand. In 1926 the first bathhouse was erected.

After the hurricane of 1938 devastated the park, the commission decided to rebuild farther east near the lighthouse, and sand was pumped onto the beach to raise a portion of the island to a height of 18 feet (5.5 m) above sea level. In 1940, the first modern bathhouse opened to the public, replacing facilities destroyed by the hurricane.

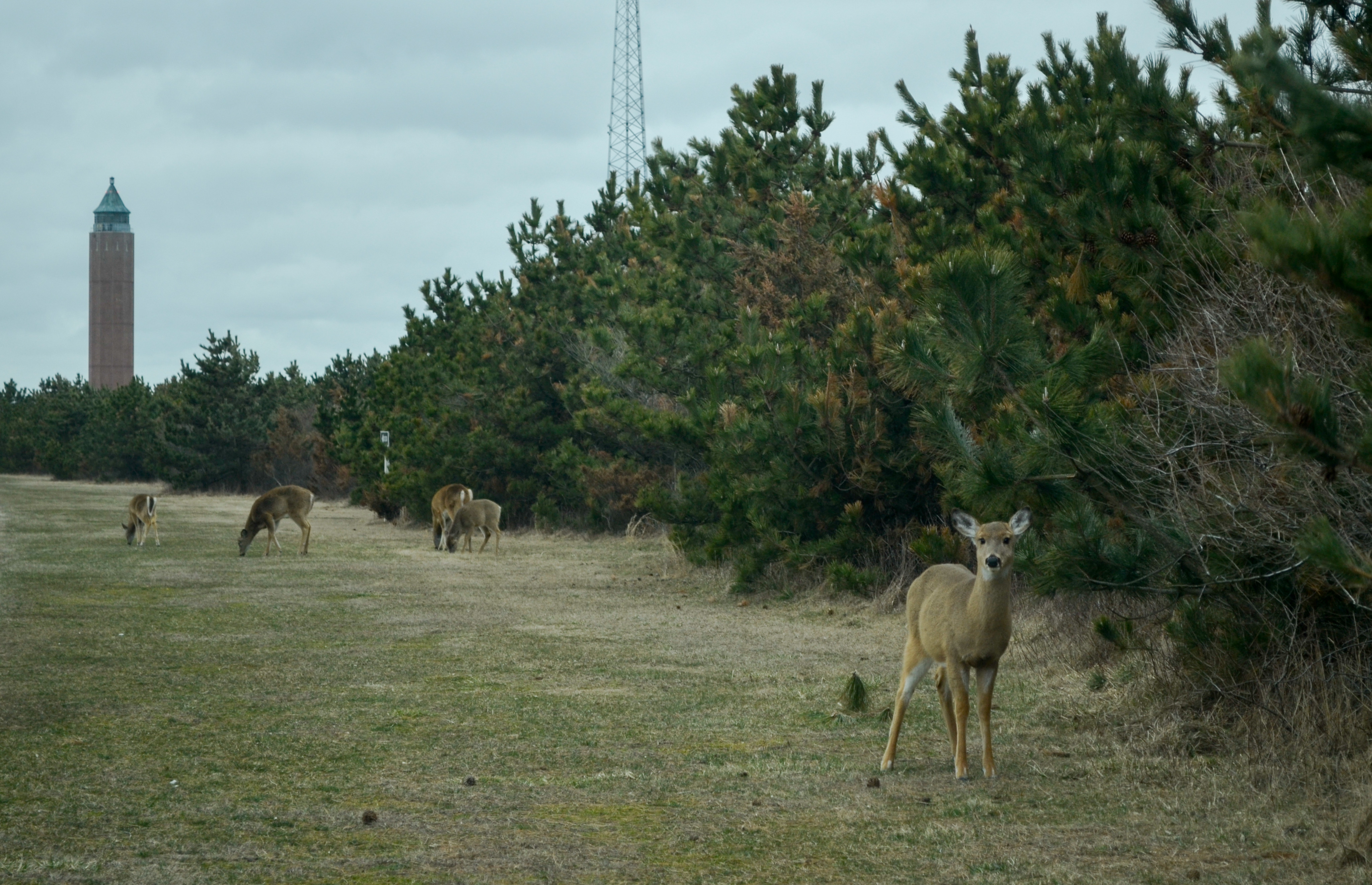
Deer in Robert Moses State Park in March 2013.

Ferry service was maintained from Babylon to the park until 1964 when the Robert Moses Causeway opened. The park was renamed for Moses that same year. Attendance boomed, and three parking fields with bathhouses were added.

Robert Moses State Park celebrated its 100th anniversary on June 27, 2008. The anniversary coincided with the completion of several improvements at the park, including a $700,000 rehabilitation of the bathhouse at Field 3. The renovation improved and expanded bathroom facilities, repaired the park's cupola and clock, and replaced a glass and metal storefront added to the building in the 1980s with a new exterior consistent with the building's original architecture. The renovations were part of $132 million in improvements for New York's state parks and historic sites enacted in 2008.

In 2013, a $7.7 million dredging and beach restoration project was conducted to replenish beaches damaged during Hurricane Sandy. The project used about 520,000 cubic yards (400,000 m^{3}) of sand removed during dredging of the Captree State Park boat canal to restore beaches at Robert Moses State Park.

A $1.7 million project to increase energy efficiency and install a 500-kilowatt solar photovoltaic power system at the park was announced in 2015. The planned improvements aim to make Robert Moses State Park the first energy-neutral state park in the United States.

In 2019 a proposal was made by Manhattanville representative Daniel J. O'Donnell to rename Robert Moses State Park in the light of a re-evaluation of the history of Long Island and the legacy of Robert Moses. The bill did not include a proposal for a new name. In February 2021 the bill progressed on to the New York State Assembly calendar, where as of December 2021 it still sits.

As of 2014, the facility attracts approximately 3.5 million visitors per year.

== See also ==
- List of New York state parks

Preceded by Kismet	Beaches of Fire Island	Succeeded by Southernmost Point
