= Smith Point Bridge =

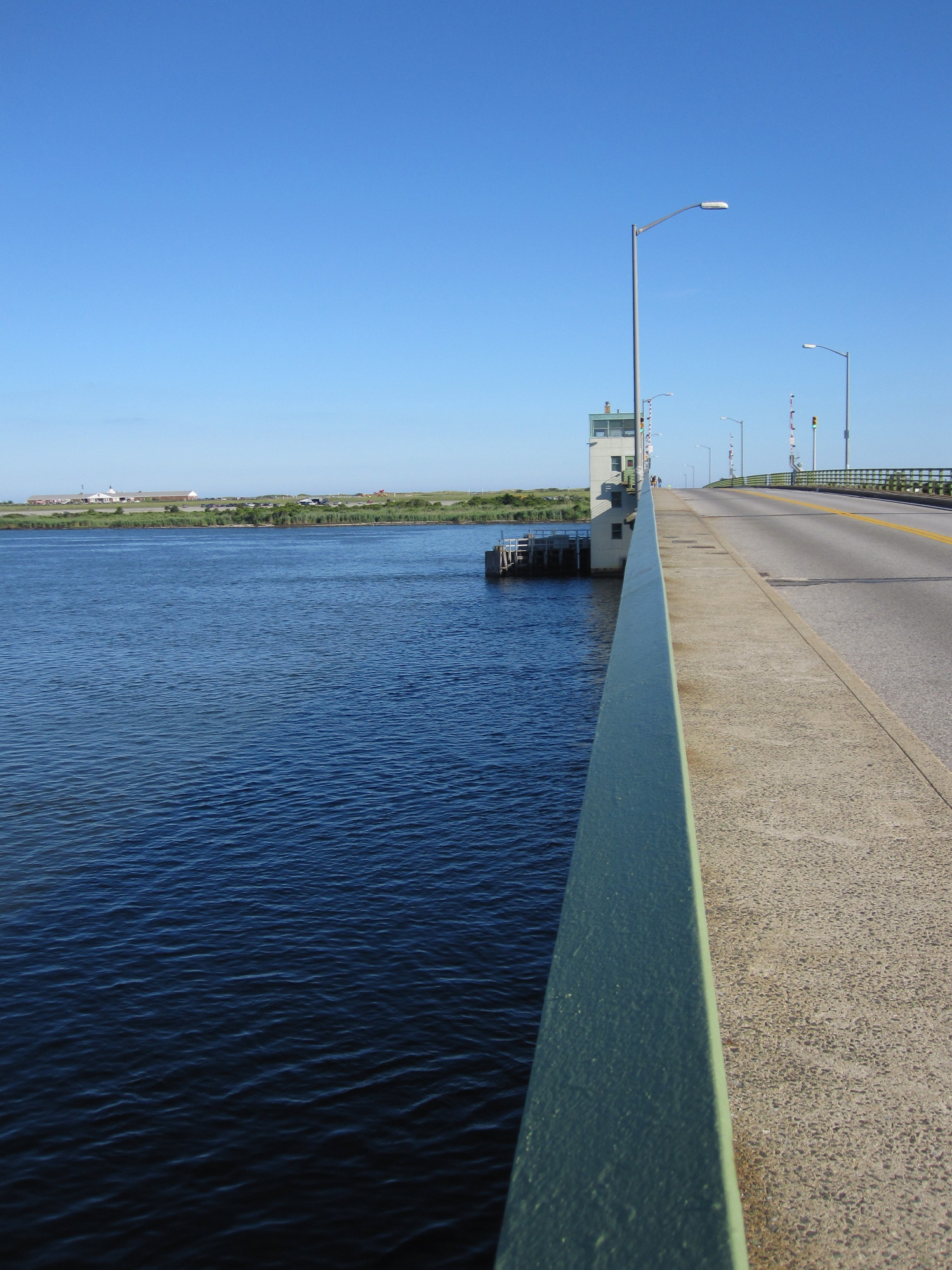
- The Smith Point Bridge looking south towards Smith Point County Park.
- Coordinates: 40°44′18″N 72°52′05″W
- Carries: 2 lanes of CR 46; William Floyd Parkway
- Crosses: Narrow Bay
- Locale: Shirley, New York, US
- Maintained by: Suffolk County Department of Public Works
- ID number: 1058770

Characteristics
- Design: Bascule drawbridge
- Material: Steel
- Total length: 1,216 feet (371 m)
- Width: 28 feet (8.5 m)
- Load limit: 29 (5 on span, 24 approach)
- Clearance above: 22 feet (6.7 m)

History
- Construction cost: $2,500,000 (1960 USD)
- Opened: July 4, 1959

Statistics
- Toll: Free

The Smith Point Bridge is a steel bascule drawbridge in Shirley, New York that connects Long Island to Fire Island. Located on the south shore of central Suffolk County, the bridge carries William Floyd Parkway (Suffolk CR 46) across The Narrows between Bellport Bay (an arm of the Great South Bay) and Moriches Bay. It connects Long Island with Smith Point County Park and the Otis Pike Fire Island High Dune Wilderness, both are a part of the Fire Island National Seashore.

== History ==
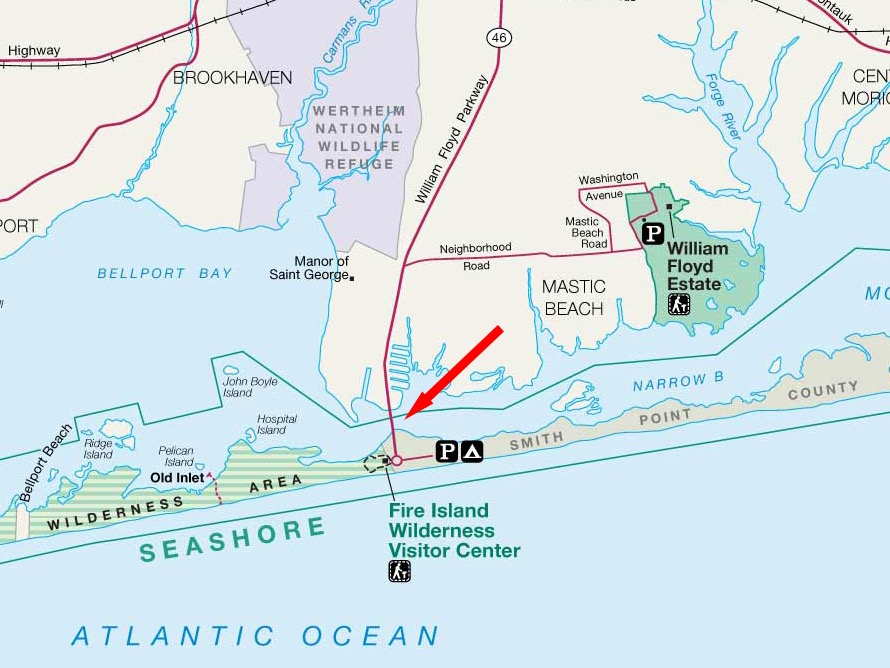
Location of the Smith Point Bridge (red arrow). Also, see full map.

The bridge derives its name from Smith Point, a peninsula on the Long Island mainland extending into Bellport Bay. Smith Point was in turn named for William "Tangier" Smith, who in the 17th century owned 50 miles of ocean front property in Manor St. George.

In 1916, Fredrick J. Quimby paid for construction of the first Tangier Bridge at Smith Point. It was a wooden footbridge with an engine driven drawbridge. It replaced boat access to Tangier Manor and Quimby's oceanfront development, intended to be a resort town to compete with Atlantic City. Early in 1917, 200 feet in the center of the bridge, including the bascule draw and all its machinery, was destroyed by an ice jam. Subsequent winter storms continued to ravage the remains of the bridge. The few subsequent wooden bridges built to varying degrees of stability over the years were all destroyed by winter ice floes.

In 1926, caravans of camels and horses passed over the bridge for the filming of The Son of the Sheik starring Rudolf Valentino and Vilma Banky.

The last wooden footbridge washed away in 1927, and no new bridges were constructed for another 32 years.

In summer 1955, the Shirley-Mastic Chamber of Commerce broke ground and invited 12,000 people to initiate the building of the new Smith Point Bridge to Fire Island. The bridge opened on July 4, 1959. The bridge that spans one-quarter-mile represented the first step by Suffolk County to preserve 810 miles of shore frontage for public purposes. The bridge project was the development of Smith Point County Park, with a beach frontage of 6,000 feet along the eastern side of Fire Island Barrier Island on Atlantic Ocean. The park includes bathing and camping facilities. The entire structure was built on concrete piles, with a reinforced concrete roadway laid on a steel beam superstructure.

== Structural Specifications ==
- Type of bridge: - Steel-deck bascule bridge (drawbridge)
- Construction started: July 16, 1955
- Opened to traffic: - July 4, 1959
- Length of bascule draw span: - 80 feet (24 m)
- Total length of bridge: - 1,216 feet (371 m)
- Width of bridge: - 28 feet (8.5 m)
- Number of traffic lanes: - 2 lanes
- Width of roadway: - 22 feet (6.7 m)
- Clearance at center above mean high water: - 22 feet (6.7 m)
- Cost of original structure (including approaches): - $2,500,000

== Replacement ==
The Suffolk County Legislature approved $73 million in funding for a new bridge on Tuesday, June 11, 2019. The new bridge is expected to have a 75- to 100-year life span. The bridge will not be a drawbridge, but will be built with a 55 ft (17 m) vertical clearance above the high water mark. The bridge will also have wider shoulders and sidewalks to better accommodate pedestrian traffic. The federal government is funding 80 percent of the project's cost, with the county's share, 20 percent, a release said. The project received an additional $5 million in federal funding with the passage of the Consolidated Appropriations Act of 2024.

== See also ==
- Outer Barrier Islands
- Great South Bay
- Great South Bay Bridge
- Patchogue Bay
- Fire Island Wilderness
- Fire Island Inlet Bridge
- Moriches Bay
