= Fire Island =

Island in New York

Fire Island parallels the South Shore of Long Island.

Fire Island is the large center island of the outer barrier islands parallel to the South Shore of Long Island in the U.S. state of New York.

In 2012, Hurricane Sandy once again divided Fire Island into two islands. Together, these two islands are about 31 miles (50 km) long and vary between 520 and 1,310 feet (160 and 400 m) wide. The land area of Fire Island is 9.6 square miles (24.9 km^{2}). The majority of the island's land is protected by Fire Island National Seashore, which was created in 1964 in response to a protest movement against the construction of a highway through the island. As of 2024, life for Fire Island visitors and residents was defined by restrictions on personal automobile use meant to preserve the island's unique character and ecosystems.

Fire Island is part of Suffolk County. It lies within the towns of Babylon, Islip, and Brookhaven, containing two villages and several hamlets. All parts of the island not within village limits are part of the Fire Island census-designated place (CDP), which had a permanent population of 777 at the 2020 census, though that expands to thousands of residents and tourists during the summer. The neighborhoods of Cherry Grove and Fire Island Pines are known as gay-friendly tourist destinations.

== History ==
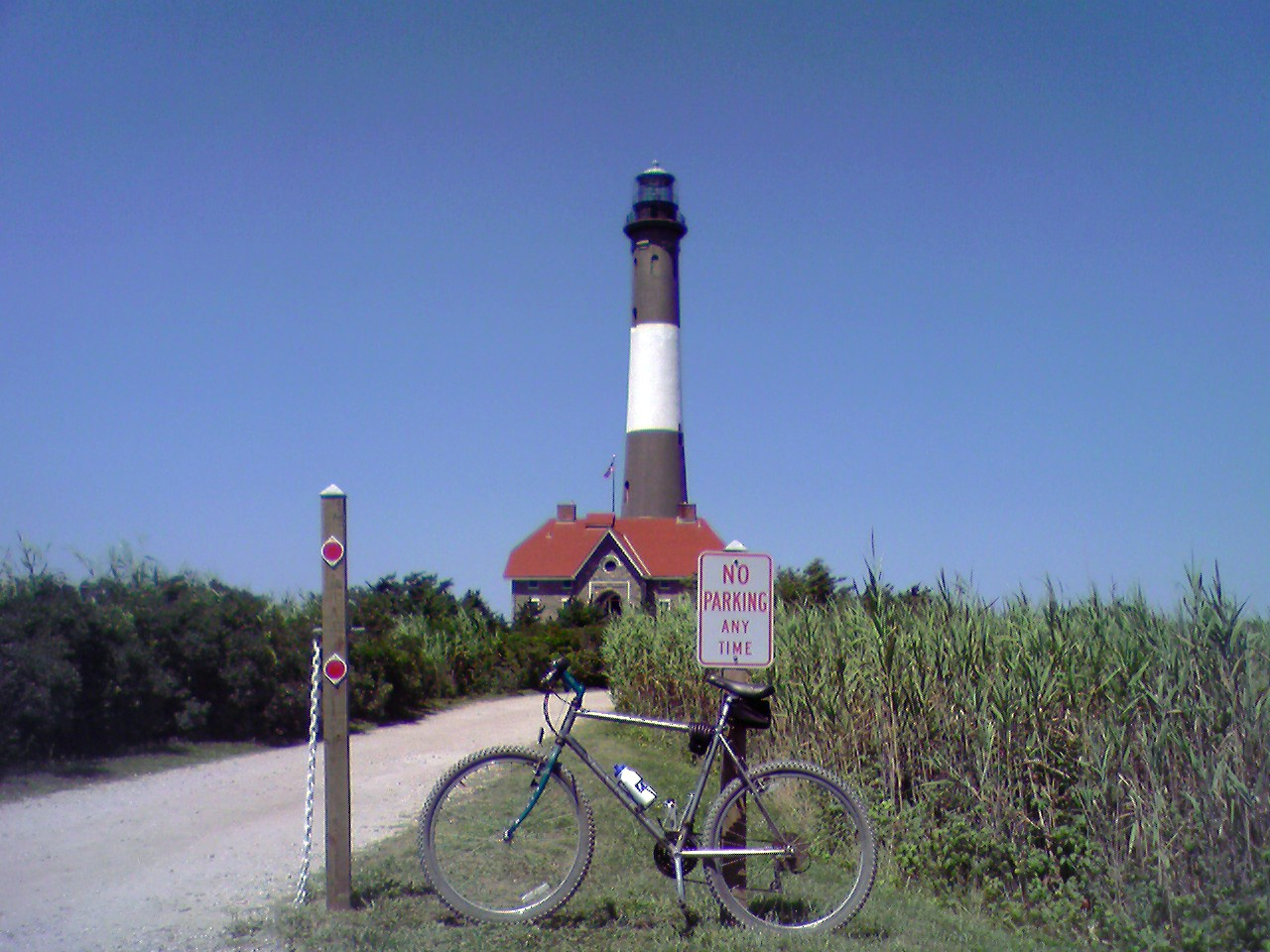
Fire Island Lighthouse, east of Robert Moses field 5

=== Etymology ===
The origin of Fire Island's name is uncertain. It is believed its Native American name was Sictem Hackey ("Land of the Secatogues"). The Secatogues were a tribe in the area of the current town of Islip. It was part of what was also called the "Seal Islands".

The name of Fire Island first appeared on a deed in 1789.

Historian Richard Bayles suggests that the name derives from a misinterpretation or corruption of the Dutch word vijf ("five"), or in another version vier ("four"), referring to the number of islands near the Fire Island inlet, a view echoed by Robert Caro, who suggests in The Power Broker that the island was named to reflect four inlets that have since disappeared. At times histories have referred to it in the plural, as "Fire Islands", because of the inlet breaks.

While the western portion of the island was referred to as Fire Island for many years, the eastern portion was referred to as Great South Beach until 1920, when widespread development caused the whole land mass to be called Fire Island.

=== Settlement ===
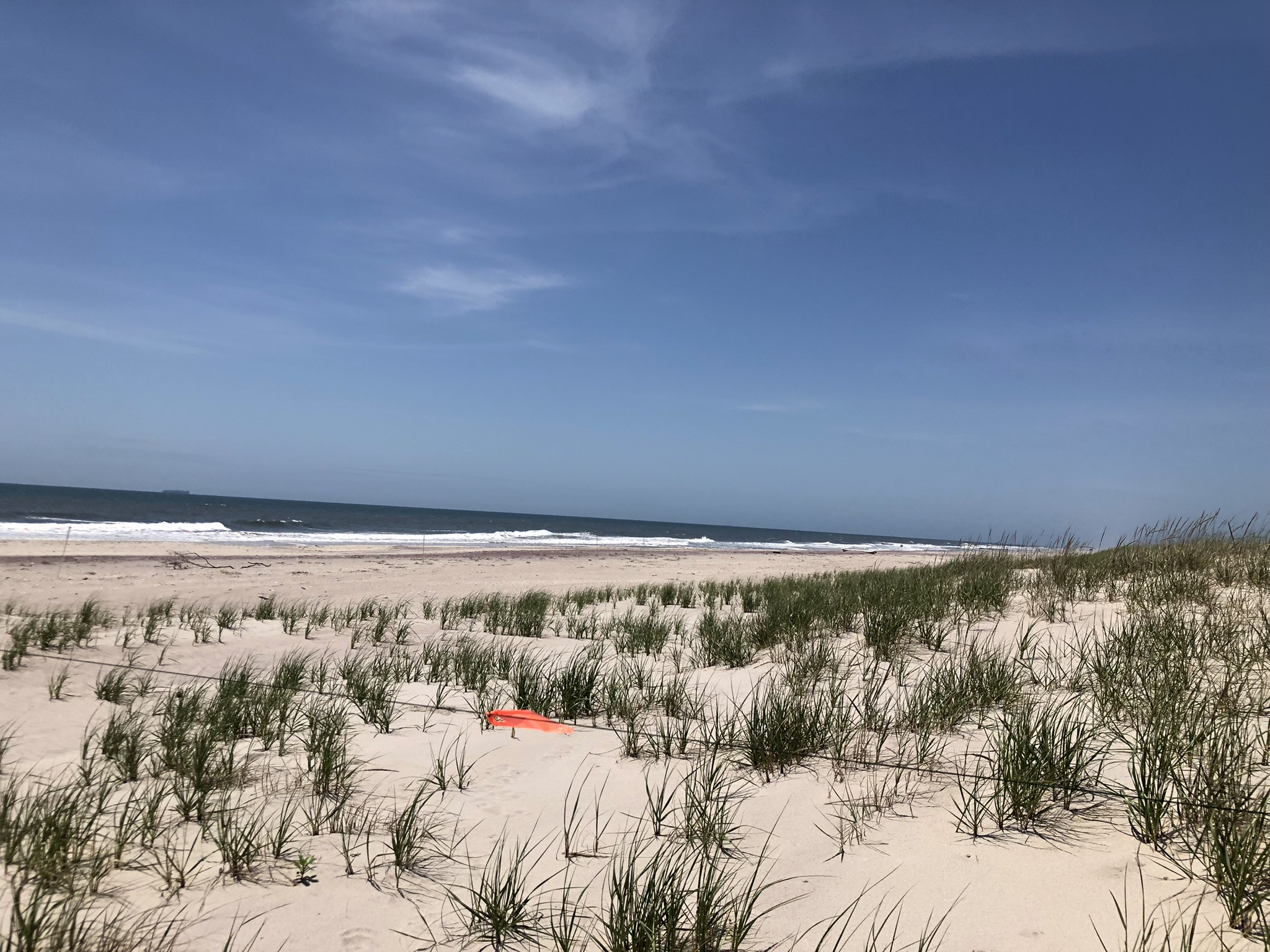
The Fire Island National Seashore during Spring

Indigenous Native Americans lived on Long Island and Fire Island for many centuries before Europeans arrived. There exists a myth that the islands were occupied by "thirteen tribes" "neatly divided into thirteen tribal units, beginning with the Canarsie who lived in present-day Brooklyn and ending with the Montauk on the far eastern end of the island." But modern ethnographic research indicates that before the European invasion, Long Island and Fire Island were occupied by "indigenous groups [...] organized into village systems with varying levels of social complexity. They lived in small communities that were connected in an intricate web of kinship relations [...] there were probably no native peoples living in tribal systems on Long Island until after the Europeans arrived. [...] The communities appear to have been divided into two general culture areas that overlapped in the area known today as the Hempstead Plains [...]. The western groups spoke the Delaware-Munsee dialect of Algonquian and shared cultural characteristics such as the longhouse system of social organization with their brethren in what is now New Jersey and Delaware. The linguistic affiliation of the eastern groups is less well understood [...] Goddard [...] concluded that the languages here are related to the southern New England Algonquian dialects, but he could only speculate on the nature of these relationships [...]. Working with a few brief vocabulary lists of Montauk and Unquachog, he suggested that the Montauk might be related to Mohegan-Pequot and the Unquachog might possibly be grouped with the Quiripi of western Connecticut. The information on the Shinnecock was too sparse for any determination [...] The most common pattern of indigenous life on Long Island prior to the intervention of the whites was the autonomous village linked by kinship to its neighbors."

"Most of the 'tribal' names with which we are now familiar do not appear to have been recognized by either the first European observers or by the original inhabitants until the process of land purchases began after the first settlements were established. We simply do not know what these people called themselves, but all the ethnographic data on North American Indian cultures suggest that they identified themselves in terms of lineage and clan membership. [...] The English and Dutch were frustrated by this lack of structure because it made land purchase so difficult. Deeds, according to the European concept of property, had to be signed by identifiable owners with authority to sell and have specific boundaries on a map. The relatively amorphous leadership structure of the Long Island communities, the imprecise delineation of hunting ground boundaries, and their view of the land as a living entity to be used rather than owned made conventional European real estate deals nearly impossible to negotiate. The surviving primary records suggest that the Dutch and English remedied this situation by pressing cooperative local sachems to establish a more structured political base in their communities and to define their communities as "tribes" with specific boundaries [...] The Montauk, under the leadership of Wyandanch in the mid-seventeenth century, and the Matinnecock, under the sachems Suscaneman and Tackapousha, do appear to have developed rather tenuous coalitions as a result of their contact with the English settlers."

"An early example of [European] intervention into Native American political institutions is a 1664 agreement wherein the East Hampton and Southampton officials appointed a sunk squaw named Quashawam to govern both the Shinnecock and the Montauk."

- William "Tangier" Smith held title to the entire island in the 17th century, under a royal patent from Thomas Dongan. The remnants of Smith's Manor of St. George are open to the public in Shirley, New York. "On May 25, 1691 Col. William "Tangier" Smith purchased from the Indian, John Mayhew the enormous acreage, later to be known as the Manor of St. George. He then set aside 175 acres of the land occupied by the Unkechaug Indians on the west side of the Mastic (Forge) River at Poosepatuck Creek to be theirs for the annual rent of two ears of corn. The Poosepatuck Indian Reservation is still in existence today, however it has shrunk to 55 acres due to unscrupulous land dealings by early officials."
- The first large house was built in 1795 in Cherry Grove by Jeremiah Smith. Smith was said to have lured ships to their doom and killed the crews.
- In the early 19th century when slavery in New York was still legal, slave runners built stockades on the island by the Fire Island Inlet.
- The first Fire Island Lighthouse was built in 1825 and was replaced by the current lighthouse in 1858.
- In 1855, David S. S. Sammis bought 120 acres (0.49 km^{2}) near the Fire Island Lighthouse and built the Surf Hotel at what today is Kismet. Sammis operated the hotel until 1892, when the state took it over. In 1908, it became the first state park on Long Island.
- In 1868, Archer and Elizabeth Perkinson bought the land around Cherry Grove and Fire Island Pines. They built a hotel in 1880.
- In 1887, the Life-Saving Service established 11 staffed lifesaving stations on the island.
- In 1892, troops were called out to suppress a potential riot at Democrat Point over a cholera panic.
- In 1908, Ocean Beach was established, followed by Saltaire in 1910.
- In 1921, the Perkinsons sold the land around Cherry Grove in small lots. Bungalows from the newly closed Camp Upton in Yaphank were ferried over the Great South Bay to build the new community. Duffy's Hotel was built in 1930.
- The Great Hurricane of 1938 devastated much of the island and made it appear undesirable to many. However, Duffy's Hotel remained relatively undamaged. According to legend, the gay population began to concentrate in Cherry Grove at Duffy's Hotel with Christopher Isherwood and W. H. Auden dressed as Dionysus and Ganymede and carried aloft on a gilded litter by a group of singing followers. The gay influence was continued in the 1960s when male model John B. Whyte developed Fire Island Pines. The Pines currently has some of the most expensive property on the island and accounts for two-thirds of the island's swimming pools.
- In 1964, Robert Moses built the Captree Causeway to the western end of the island. Opponents, fearing that this was the beginning of plans for the continuation of Ocean Parkway, which would have run down the middle of the island, organized and eventually stopped the parkway.
- In September 1964, Lyndon Johnson signed a bill creating Fire Island National Seashore.

=== Shipwrecks ===
On May 17, 1850, Margaret Fuller, her husband Ossoli, and their young son Angelino, began a five-week return voyage to the United States aboard the ship Elizabeth, an American merchant freighter carrying cargo that included mostly marble from Carrara. They set sail on May 17. At sea, the ship's captain, Seth Hasty, died of smallpox. Angelino contracted the disease and recovered.

Possibly because of the inexperienced first mate now serving as captain, the ship slammed into a sandbar less than 100 yards from Fire Island on July 19, 1850, around 3:30 am Many of the other passengers and crew members abandoned ship. The first mate, Mr. Bangs, urged Fuller and Ossoli to try to save themselves and their child as he himself jumped overboard, later claiming he believed Fuller had wanted to be left behind to die. On the beach, people arrived with carts hoping to salvage any cargo washed ashore. None made any effort to rescue the crew or passengers of the Elizabeth, though they were only 50 yards from shore. Most of those aboard attempted to swim to shore, leaving Fuller and Ossoli and Angelino some of the last on the ship. Ossoli was thrown overboard by a massive wave and, after the wave had passed, a crewman who witnessed the event said Fuller could not be seen.

Henry David Thoreau traveled to New York City at the urging of Emerson to search the shore, but neither Fuller's body nor that of her husband was ever recovered. Angelino's had washed ashore. Few of their possessions were found other than some of the child's clothes and a few letters. Fuller's manuscript on the rise and fall of the 1849 Roman Republic, which she described as "what is most valuable to me if I live of any thing", was also lost. A memorial to Fuller was erected on the beach at Fire Island in 1901 through the efforts of Julia Ward Howe. A cenotaph to Fuller and Ossoli, under which Angelino is buried, is in Mount Auburn Cemetery in Cambridge, Massachusetts. The inscription reads, in part:

By birth a child of New England By adoption a citizen of Rome By genius belonging to the world

=== As gay village ===
When New York's artistic bohème began frequenting Fire Island during the Jazz Age, Ocean Beach became the locale's first gay village. Tensions between the gay (often famous) tourists and locals peaked when Antoine de Paris built an outhouse, complete with a revealing saloon door, on his land across the street from a Catholic church. Villagers arranged a provocation by sending a teenage boy to "seduce" one of Antoine's guests, and after catching the guest in flagrante, they burned down Antoine's property. After the Great Hurricane of 1938 devastated the island, the middle class moved to Saltaire, while the gay community settled in Cherry Grove.

Both Cherry Grove and Fire Island Pines were established gay enclaves by the 1950s, connected by a notorious cruising area nicknamed the Meat Rack. The party-filled culture of the pre-HIV/AIDS 1970s is portrayed in Andrew Holleran's 1978 novel Dancer from the Dance. The Botel (today the Grove Hotel) was gay-friendly and ran popular afternoon "tea dances". Cherry Grove calls itself "America's First Gay and Lesbian Town". Fire Island has "an iconic gay scene" and the Grove Hotel is New York State's only hotel that prohibits those under 21 on the premises; this is legal because the hotel's entrance is through a bar.

Fire Island: A Century in the Life of an American Paradise by Jack Parlett, and Cherry Grove, Fire Island: Sixty Years in America's First Gay and Lesbian Town by Esther Newton chronicle the gay history of Fire Island. The gay subculture of Fire Island in the 1970s and 1980s is depicted in Faggots by Larry Kramer, and And the Band Played On by Randy Shilts. The portrayal of promiscuous sex and recreational drug use provoked controversy and was condemned by some elements within the gay community.

=== 2009: Beach renourishment ===
A 2009 beach renourishment program was credited with saving the island from the full effects of Hurricane Sandy in 2012.

In the winter and spring of 2009, a beach renourishment project was undertaken on Fire Island, with the cooperation of the National Park Service, the U.S. Army Corps of Engineers, the Towns of Brookhaven and Islip, and Fire Island residents. The program involved dredging sand from an offshore borrow area, pumping it onto the beach, and shaping the sand into an approved beach face and dune template in front of the communities of Corneille Estates, Davis Park, Dunewood, Fair Harbor, Fire Island Pines, Fire Island Summer Club, Lonelyville, Ocean Bay Park, Ocean Beach, Saltaire, and Seaview. Fire Islanders agreed to a significant property tax increase to help pay for the project, which was estimated to cost between $23 and $25 million ($6,020 per housing unit), including the cost of environmental monitoring, and was expected to add 1,400,000 cubic meters (1,800,000 cubic yards) of sand in front of the participating communities. The Towns of Brookhaven and Islip, in which the communities are located, issued bonds to pay for the project, backed by the new taxes levied by community Erosion Control Taxing Districts.

=== 2012: Hurricane Sandy ===
The island was heavily damaged by the high tides associated with Hurricane Sandy in 2012, including three breaches around Smith Point County Park on the sparsely populated eastern end of the island. The biggest breach, and politically the most difficult one to deal with because it is in a wilderness area, is at Old Inlet in the Otis Pike Wilderness Area just west of Smith Point County Park. Old Inlet is at the site of previous breaches (which have come and gone on their own) and was 108 feet (33 meters) wide after the storm on the south end and 1,171 feet (357 meters) on February 28, 2013. Officials have been debating whether to close the breach and let nature take its course, as it has been flushing out the Great South Bay and improving water quality. But residents of the bayfront communities noted increased flooding after the storm. This was later found to be the result of several nor'easters and unrelated to the breaches. As of 2018, the breach remained open. Officials have moved to close the other two breaches, which are on either side of Moriches Inlet—one in Cupsogue County Park and the other in Smith Point County Park.

Reports indicated that 80 percent of the homes, particularly those on the east end, were flooded, and 90 homes were completely destroyed. The storm also tore away about 75 feet of the dune coastline. But Fire Island was not hit as hard as other areas, with most of the 4,500 homes on the island surviving even if damaged, and significant home reconstruction has taken place. Officials credited the dune replenishment program with helping to spare the island.

=== 2025: National Park Service funding cut ===
Early in President Donald Trump's second term, the Department of Government Efficiency (DOGE) cut funding for the National Park Service and other federal agencies. This caused staff shortages and other problems at Fire Island National Seashore and delayed the renovation of the Fire Island Lighthouse. Protests against the cuts were held on March 1, 2025, in coordination with other "Protect Your Parks Protest" events held at other NPS units across the country. As of November 2026 funding issues continued to plague the national seashore delaying renovations to the lighthouse, marsh restoration, and other programs.

== Geography ==
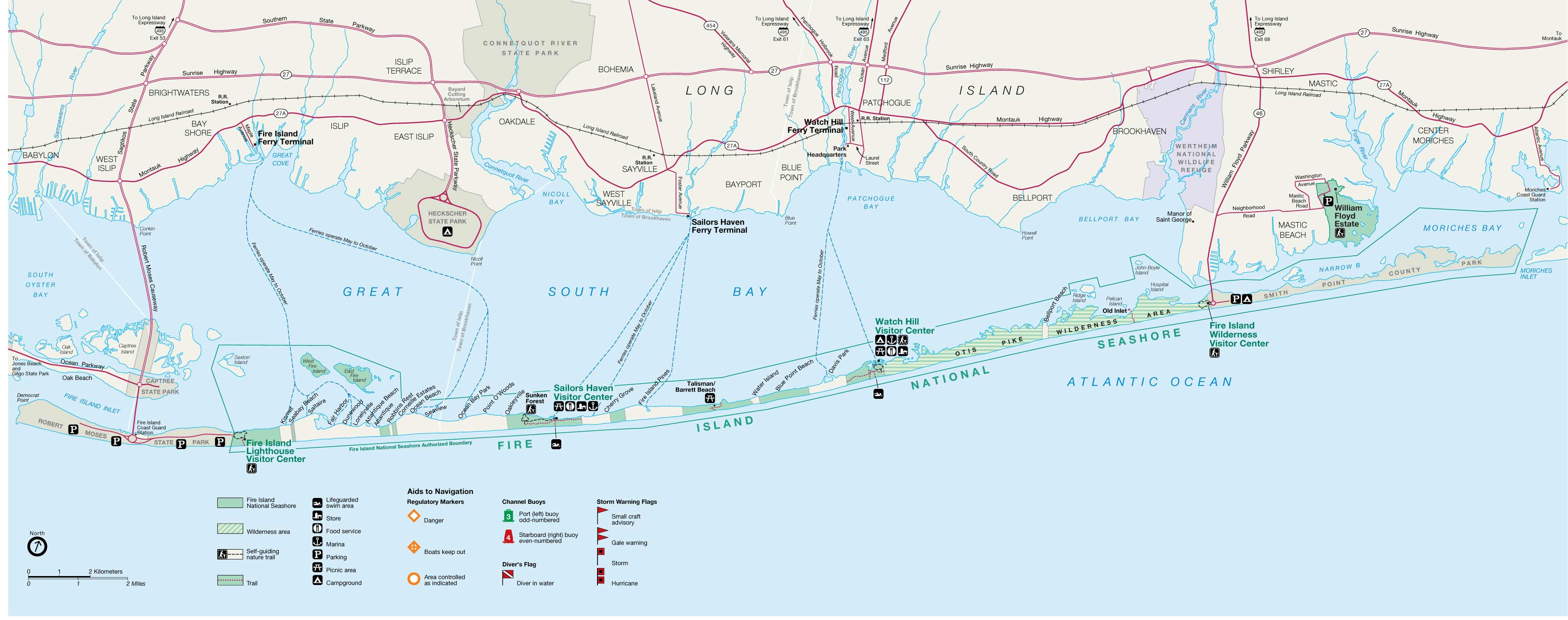
Map of Fire Island National Seashore

Fire Island lies on average 3.9 miles (6.2 km) off the South Shore of Long Island, but nearly touches it along the East End. It is separated from Long Island by the Great South Bay, which spans interconnected bays along Long Island: Patchogue Bay, Bellport Bay, Narrow Bay, and Moriches Bay.

The island and its resort communities are accessible by boat, seaplane, and a number of ferries, which run across the bay from Patchogue, Bay Shore, and Sayville, to more than 10 points on the island.

The island is accessible by automobile near each end: via Robert Moses Causeway on its western end, and by William Floyd Parkway (Suffolk County Road 46) near its eastern end. Motor vehicles are not permitted on the rest of the island, except for utility, construction and emergency access and with limited beach-driving permits in winter.

Fire Island is located at 40°39′35″ north, 73°5′23″ west (40.653°N 73.126°W). According to the United States Census Bureau, it has a land area of 9.6 square miles (24.9 km^{2}).

In 1834, Ferdinand Rudolph Hassler, a Swiss-American surveyor, measured at Fire Island the first baseline of the Survey of the Coast, shortly before Louis Puissant declared to the French Academy of Sciences in 1836 that Jean Baptiste Joseph Delambre and Pierre Méchain had made errors in the meridian arc measurement, which had been used to determine the length of the metre.

=== Historical modifications ===
The island's physical attributes have changed over time, and continue to change. At one point it stretched more than 60 miles (97 km) from Jones Beach Island to Southampton.

Around 1683, Fire Island Inlet broke through, separating it from Jones Beach Island.

The Fire Island Inlet grew to 9 miles (14 km) in width before receding. The Fire Island Lighthouse was built in 1858, right on the inlet, but Fire Island's western terminus at Democrat Point has steadily moved west so that the lighthouse today is 5.3 miles (9 km) from the inlet.

Fire Island separated from Southampton in a 1931 Nor'easter when Moriches Inlet broke through. The inlet widened on September 21, 1938. Moriches Inlet and efforts by local communities east of Fire Island to protect their beachfront with jetties have led to an interruption in the longshore drift of sand going from east to west and are blamed for erosion of the Fire Island beachfront. Between these major breaks there have been reports over the years of at least six inlets that broke through the island but have since disappeared.

== Landmarks and preserves ==
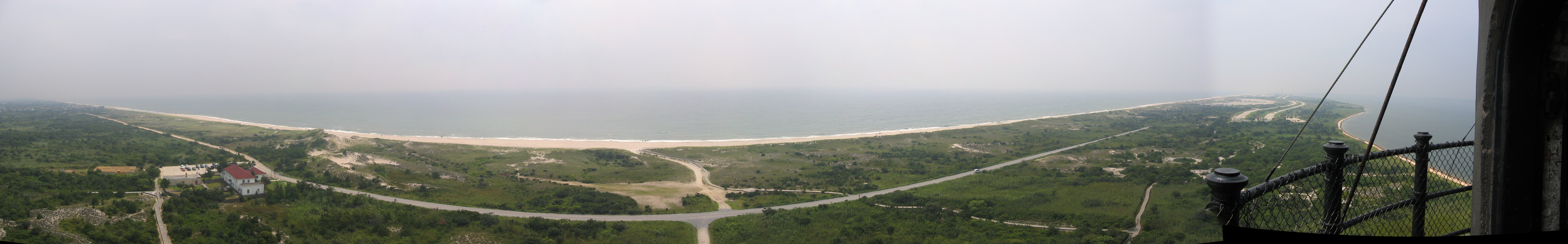
Panorama of Fire Island from the top of the Fire Island Light (distorted view)

Except for the western 4 1/2 miles (7.2 km) of the island, the island is protected as part of Fire Island National Seashore. Robert Moses State Park, occupying the remaining western portion of the island, is one of the popular recreational destinations in the New York City area. The Fire Island Light stands just east of Robert Moses State Park.

A memorial to TWA 800, dedicated in June 2002, is on the eastern end, at Smith Point County Park, near where the airplane crashed at sea.

== Locations ==
Towns are listed below from west to east, communities within each town are listed alphabetically.

=== Town of Babylon ===
- Fire Island Inlet
- Robert Moses State Park (part)

=== Town of Islip ===
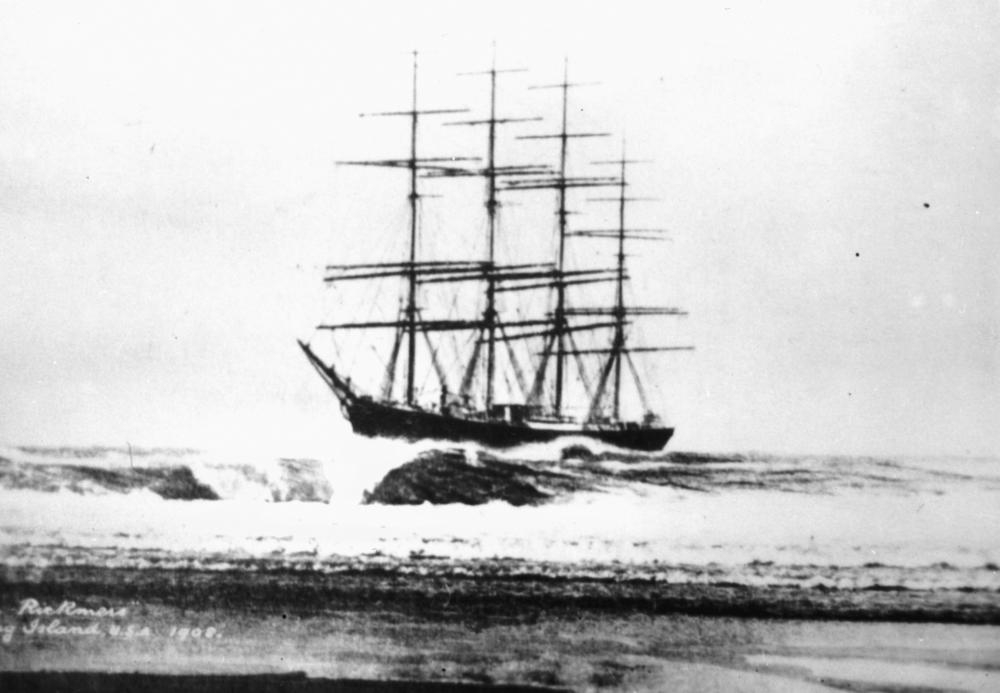
German full-rigged ship Peter Rickmers aground on Fire Island, April 30, 1908

- Atlantique
- Corneille Estates
- Dunewood
- Fair Harbor
- Fire Island Light
- Fire Island Summer Club
- Kismet
- Lonelyville
- Ocean Beach (village)
- Robert Moses State Park (park)
- Robbins Rest
- Saltaire (village)
- Seabay Beach
- Seaview

=== Town of Brookhaven ===
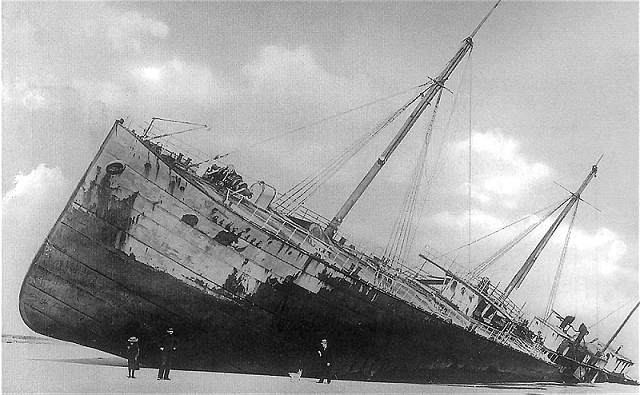
The world's first true tanker, the Glückauf, stranded on March 23/24, 1893 in heavy fog at Blue Point Beach on Fire Island

- Bellport Beach
- Blue Point Beach
- Cherry Grove
- Davis Park/Ocean Ridge
- Fire Island Pines
- Moriches Inlet
- Oakleyville
- Ocean Bay Park
- Otis Pike Fire Island High Dune Wilderness
- Point O'Woods
- Smith Point County Park
- Sunken Forest
- Talisman/Barrett Beach
- Watch Hill, National Park Service facility in the central part of the island, including a public marina, camp ground visitor center, and nature trail
- Water Island

=== Small islands in the vicinity ===
The following are associated islands in the Fire Island National Seashore Jurisdiction, from west to east:

- Sexton Island, a small island across from the Fire Island Lighthouse with approximately 20 small, private, summer houses. There is no ferry service or electrical service.
- West Fire Island, a small island with about a dozen houses. It has no telephone or electrical service.
- East Fire Island, another longer and larger island next to West Fire Island. East Fire Island, unlike West Fire Island, is uninhabited. People are allowed, but due to the lack of a ferry service it can only be accessed by personal boat.
- Ridge Island
- Pelican Island, a small barrier island, is found off the southern shore of the county near Bellport.
- John Boyle Island
- Hospital Island

=== Other locations ===
- Clam Pond, a small cove between Saltaire and Fair Harbor

== Inhabitants ==
Fire Island's population varies seasonally. There are few residents in winter months, with the population rising in the late spring to early fall.

Housing is mostly stick-built bungalow-style. Some are beachfront, built on the dunes of the Atlantic Ocean, while others are on boardwalks or concrete walks, like a miniaturized city. For year-round residents, there are schools, churches, shops and even a school bus service to the mainland of Long Island via an off-road modified school bus.

The quiet villages on Fire Island provide solitude, while the larger towns provide a more social atmosphere with clubs, bars and open air dining. Two of these, Fire Island Pines and Cherry Grove, are destinations for LGBTQ vacationers.

The incorporated villages of Ocean Beach and Saltaire within Fire Island National Seashore are car-free during the summer tourist season (Memorial Day through Labor Day) and permit only pedestrian and bicycle traffic (during certain hours only in Ocean Beach). For off-season use, there are a limited number of driving permits for year-round residents and contractors. The hamlet of Davis Park allows no vehicles or bicycles year-round.

In 1992 Diane Ketcham of The New York Times noted that due to the lack of retail, entertainment, and television options, especially in the winter, area children often felt bored and therefore felt excited to attend school.

=== Demographics ===
As of the 2000 United States census, 491 people, 138 households, and 77 families resided on Fire Island. The population density was 52.82/mi^{2} (21.82/km^{2}). There were 4,153 housing units, at an average density of 478.1/mi^{2} (184.6/km^{2}). The racial makeup of the town was 96.77% White, 0.65% Asian, 0.32% Pacific Islander, 0.65% from other races, and 1.61% from two or more races. Hispanic or Latino of any race were 2.90% of the population.

There were 138 households on Fire Island, out of which 25.4% had children under the age of 18 living with them, 48.6% were married couples living together, 2.2% had a female householder with no husband present, and 44.2% were non-families. 34.8% of all households were made up of individuals, and 10.1% had someone living alone who was 65 years of age or older. The average household size was 2.20 and the average family size was 2.90.

Fire Island's population was spread out, with 20.6% under the age of 18, 6.5% from 18 to 24, 29.0% from 25 to 44, 33.5% from 45 to 64, and 10.3% who were 65 years of age or older. The median age was 42 years. For every 100 females there were 133.1 males. For every 100 females age 18 and over, there were 143.6 males.

The median income for a household on Fire Island was $73,281, and the median income for a family was $83,672. Males had a median income of $46,875 versus $41,429 for females. The per capita income for Fire Island was $43,681. 0.0% of families and 3.1% of individuals were below the poverty line, including 0.0% of those under age 18 and 8.6% of those age 65 or over.

=== Famous summer residents ===
After the Manhattan theater community began staying on Fire Island during the 1920s, the island had numerous summer celebrity residents.

- Gary Beach, Tony award-winning actor
- Fanny Brice, actress, whose house in Ocean Beach is home to the OB Youth Group
- Mel Brooks wrote, with Carl Reiner, the "2000 Year Old Man" in their home on the beach.
- James Kenneth Campbell, lawyer and longtime Saltaire Village Justice
- Barbara Corcoran, investor, TV personality
- Tina Fey, creator of 30 Rock, stays during the summer at Fair Harbor and Ocean Beach
- Henry Fonda, actor, built a summer home in the Pines.
- Wolcott Gibbs, theater critic of The New Yorker
- Samuel Adams Green, art dealer
- Joseph Heller
- Ring Lardner, Jr.
- John Lennon, of the Beatles; the piano he shipped to the island is currently at the Rock and Roll Hall of Fame in Cleveland
- Joan McCracken, dancer, who spent much of her final years there
- Kevin Nash, professional wrestler
- Christopher Noth, known for his acting in Sex and the City and Law and Order, stays in Ocean Beach in the summer
- Frank O'Hara, writer, poet, art critic, curator at Museum of Modern Art; died after being struck by a dune buggy on Fire Island.
- Carl Reiner, writer, completed the first season of The Dick Van Dyke Show scripts while living on Fire Island
- Lea Thompson, Back to the Future star, and her director husband Howard Deutch
- Herman Wouk, writer, responsible for the construction of the Fire Island Synagogue in Seaview

== Emergency services ==
Fire Island is served by ten fire departments and two police departments, but its lack of roads, isolation, changing geography, and seasonal residency make it harder to provide police, fire, and ambulance services. Fire department vehicles, built to traverse sand, are heavily modified four-wheel drive with suspension lifts, large-diameter off-road tires, and recovery equipment.

In 1986, the lack of ambulance service on Fire Island led to the formation of rescue companies by the village of Saltaire, then Ocean Beach, and, in the 2000s, Fair Harbor. Fire departments on Fire Island are obliged to provide mutual aid to neighboring communities. Some coastal fire departments on Long Island have fully equipped marine rescue and fireboat units that can cross the Great South Bay to provide necessary assistance.

Fire Island's corps of off-road-capable fire apparatus and the firefighters' training to use them provide much-needed support in the event of a wildfire, as was illustrated in the Long Island Central Pine Barrens fires of 1995.

Good Samaritan Hospital Medical Center, Southside Hospital, and Brookhaven Memorial Hospital Medical Center sit across the Great South Bay from Fire Island in the Long Island hamlets of West Islip, Bay Shore, and the village of Patchogue, respectively. A heliport for medevac helicopter use is next to Good Samaritan Hospital Medical Center. Specially equipped boats provided by the Suffolk County Police Department Marine Bureau docked at the various communities on Fire Island provide emergency transportation to people who need dire medical care. In many cases, Long Island based ambulances will meet the boats once they cross the Bay (roughly 4.5 miles) and then drive individuals the short distance to one of the three hospitals. Also, one emergency access road connects Long Island (West Islip) to Fire Island (Kismet). However, the road ends there and does not extend the full length of the island into the other communities.

The Suffolk County Police Department Marine Bureau is the primary law enforcement agency. Ocean Beach also has its own dedicated police department. Criminal proceedings are handled by Suffolk District Court, and arrestees go to the 3rd, 1st or 5th precinct, or to one of the Suffolk County Sheriff's Office jails. Small claims and property matters are usually handled by the individual village of case origin. It is common practice for police to write tickets then send unruly visitors off the island via water taxi, at the offender's expense.

The Suffolk County Park Police and New York State Park Police patrol the Robert Moses State Park, while the National Park Service is stationed at the Fire Island Light and Fire Island National Seashore.

United States Coast Guard Station No. 25 on Fire Island provides aerial and nautical patrols to the Fire Island National Seashore and area beaches. It is among the Coast Guard's oldest stations, having been in operations since 1849.

== Education ==
School districts that cover the island include:

- Fire Island Union Free School District which operates Woodhull School (PK-6)
  - Students who graduate from Woodhull can choose to go to either the Bay Shore School District or the Islip School District for secondary levels. The respective high schools are Bay Shore High School and Islip High School.
- William Floyd Union Free School District
- Center Moriches Union Free School District
- East Moriches Union Free School District
- (for West Hampton Dunes) Remsenburg-Speonk Union Free School District

== In popular culture ==
- The 1955 novel Auntie Mame by Patrick Dennis uses a Fire Island reference to emphasize that the eponymous character keeps "queer" company.
- The August 1965 feature "Shel Silverstein on Fire Island" appeared in Playboy magazine, with humorous quips about the gay club scene there.
- The 1969 film Last Summer by Frank Perry, adapted by Eleanor Perry from the Evan Hunter novel about a summer of sexual discovery on Fire Island, brought an Oscar nomination for actress Catherine Burns.
- The pioneering 1971 gay pornographic film Boys in the Sand by Wakefield Poole was filmed on Fire Island.
- American writer Patricia Nell Warren locates parts of her 1974 best-selling novel The Front Runner on the Island, as well as parts of the 1994 sequel Harlan's Race.
- The 1975 Brian Eno album Another Green World features the song "Over Fire Island".
- Fire Island features in the 1975 best-selling novel Looking for Mr. Goodbar by Judith Rossner.
- The Village People included a song titled "Fire Island" on their 1977 debut album; the song refers to the island as "a funky weekend" and mention several locations on the island such as the Ice Palace, the Monster, the Blue Whale, and the Sandpiper.
- Rob Halford, lead singer of the heavy metal band Judas Priest, sings about a visit to a leather bar on "New York's Fire Island" in the song "Raw Deal" on the 1977 release Sin After Sin.
- The song "Come to Me" has been described as "the definitive Fire Island dance classic" because of the legendary July 7, 1979, Fire Island concert performance by 16-year-old France Joli for an oceanfront audience of 5,000 (after Donna Summer cancelled at the last minute, Joli stepped in as a replacement and became an overnight sensation).
- The 1980 teen novel My First Love and Other Disasters by Francine Pascal takes place largely on Fire Island, where the protagonist, Victoria Martin, is working as a mother's helper. (Francine Pascal: Dell, 1980)
- Fire Island is mentioned in the 1986 mystery novel by Kinky Friedman Greenwich Killing Time.
- Fire Island is mentioned in the 1988 comedy Big Business.
- Fire Island is the setting of the 1991 Terrence McNally play Lips Together, Teeth Apart.
- The song "Pretty Deep" on the 1997 album Lovesongs for Underdogs by Tanya Donelly refers to a visit to Fire Island.
- Fire Island is repeatedly referenced on the NBC sitcom Will & Grace, first broadcast in 1998.
- When Ocean Meets Sky, a 2003 documentary detailing the 50-year history of the Fire Island Pines community, includes much previously unseen archival footage.
- The 2003 album Welcome Interstate Managers by Fountains of Wayne featured the song "Fire Island" about two siblings' home-alone shenanigans while their parents vacation on the island.
- The song "Gay Messiah" on the 2004 album Want Two by Rufus Wainwright makes a reference to the popularity of Fire Island for gay and lesbian tourists, remarking that when the "gay messiah" comes, "He will fall from the star / of Studio 54 / and appear on the sand / of Fire Island's shore".
- Fire Island serves dual meanings as both a vacation destination and a homoerotic euphemism in the 2004 book Dress Your Family in Corduroy and Denim by David Sedaris.
- The mockumentary Beach Comber was filmed on Fire Island in 2004.
- The 2006 ABC reality show One Ocean View was shot on Fire Island.
- Fire Island is featured prominently in the 2008 Ann Brashares novel The Last Summer (of You and Me), about two sisters and a friend who grow up together, vacationing on the island every summer.
- The 2019 mystery film Last Ferry features a gay tourist visiting the Fire Island in search of fun and adventure, who arrives during the off-season.
- The 2022 rom-com Fire Island features a group of gay friends on a weeklong vacation to the locale.
- American Horror Story: NYC includes the locale during the series, featuring gay characters in 1981, with the particular "Fire Island" episode airing November 9, 2022.
- Episode 7 of the 2023 television miniseries Fellow Travelers (miniseries) features main characters, two gay men, on Fire Island during the 70s.
- In 2024, actor Brian J. Smith released A House Is Not a Disco, a documentary film about LGBT culture on the island.
- In the Family Guy episode "Man-Fest Destiny" (Episode 03 Season 24), Peter Griffin and his friends wash up on Fire Island after the boat they were using to search for the body of Osama bin Laden is destroyed. The friends discover the island is filled with partying men and eventually realize all of the men they are partying with are gay and that they are on Fire Island, but the gang does not mind and continues to party. However, they eventually flee the island in a high speed chase to avoid paying their share of the weekend share house bill and escape onto the last ferry of the day by riding a deer and giving the animal cocaine to boost its speed.

== Local folklore ==
Fire Island's landscapes have inspired numerous myths and legends over the last several centuries and multiple books have been written on the topic of Fire Island lore. Many of these stories take advantage of the island's history of shipwrecks and piracy to weave exciting tales of tragic ghosts and hidden treasures beneath the sand.

The Fire Island Lighthouse is particularly prominent in the mythology of this island and is rumored to be haunted. Legend has it that the historic structure is home to the ghosts of a lighthouse keeper and his daughter who died under tragic circumstances. The story goes that the daughter got sick and died before he could get medical help from the mainland. The father was then stricken with grief and responded to the tragedy by hanging himself in the lighthouse tour. It is also said that the ghosts of numerous shipwreck victims haunt the lighthouse and the shores of the island in general including the ghost of Margaret Fuller. On January 7, 2022, seven paranormal enthusiasts were allowed to spend the night investigating the lighthouse for paranormal activity, and the supposedly supernatural images and videos they captured were later published by Fire Island & Great South Bay News.

Additionally, in 2025 an urban legend about a giant cryptid horseshoe crab species appearing in the waters around the island has emerged and spread around the internet. It has been speculated that the story is meant to draw attention to New York State horseshoe crab conservation issues.

== See also ==
- Fire Island National Seashore
- Fire Island Inlet Bridge
- Jones Beach Island
- Great South Bay
