= Smith Point County Park =

Park in New York, United States

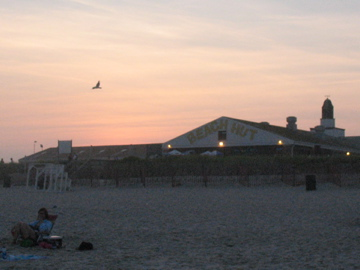
- The Pavilion (a.k.a. Beach Hut) at Smith Point County Park, New York
- Interactive map of Smith Point County Park
- Location: Fire Island, New York
- Coordinates: 40°44′18″N 72°50′40″W
- Operator: Suffolk County, New York

Smith Point County Park is a beachfront park facing the Atlantic Ocean on the east end of Fire Island, along the central south shore of Long Island, near Shirley, New York, United States. It is the largest park owned by Suffolk County.

The park derives its name from Smith Point, a peninsula on the Long Island mainland that extends into Bellport Bay. The peninsula was named for William "Tangier" Smith, who in the 17th century owned 50 miles (80 km) of ocean-front property in the Manor of St. George. The park is not on the Smith Point peninsula.

== Overview ==
Smith Point Park, located on the barrier island of Fire Island, is a haven for sportsmen, surfers and beach lovers. An extremely popular facility, the park has white sands, rolling Atlantic surf and an adjoining camping facility that attract both Suffolk County residents and tourists each summer.

Reservations are required for all the sites in the campground. All sites have water, and many have electric hookups and sewers. Outer beach camping is available on first come, first served basis, beach conditions permitting.

A nationally recognized team of lifeguards makes Smith Point its home base, providing ocean visitors with safety protection. With permits, people may drive off-road vehicles on the western portion of the outer beach. All beach-goers are advised to respect the protective fencing that marks nest sites of endangered shorebirds inhabiting the ocean and bay beaches.

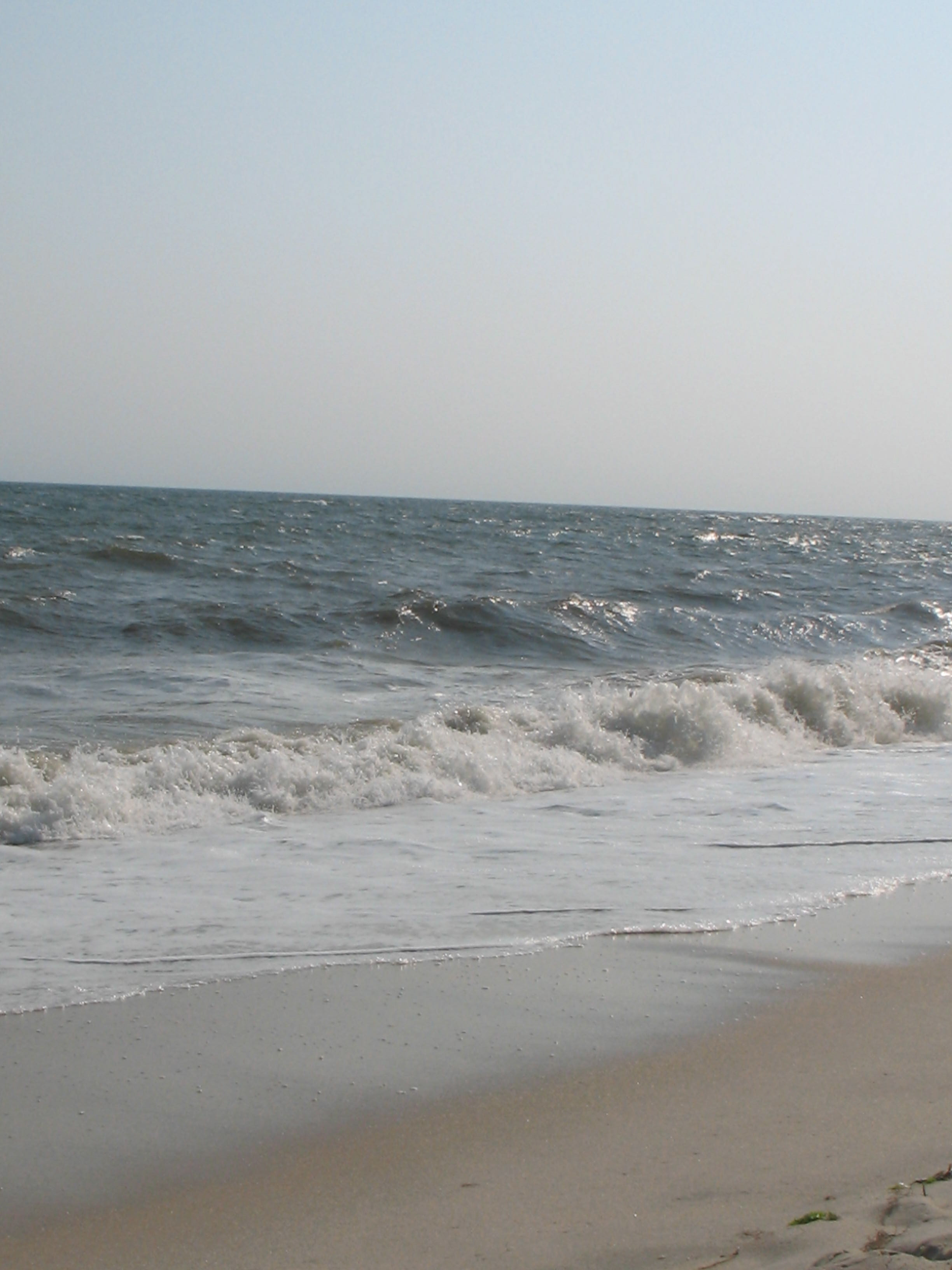
Smith Point Beach

Special events are scheduled throughout the summer months at Smith Point County Park.

William Floyd Parkway provides access to the beach and rest of the park. It crosses Narrow Bay on the two-lane Smith Point Bridge. Large parking fields with tunnels to the seashore are available at the end of the Parkway.

A jeep road (with access by permit only) extends to the end of the island. This road as well as the main road along the beach (Suffolk CR 75) was originally intended to be part of the Ocean Parkway Extension. Suffolk Transit's 7E route served the beach on a seasonal basis, connecting it with the Mastic–Shirley Long Island Rail Road station on the Montauk Branch, until it was discontinued in October 2016. From 1983 until the late 1990s, Suffolk Transit also ran the S74 bus during the summer from Smith Haven Mall to Smith Point.

The park extends from the east end of the Fire Island Wilderness portion of the National Seashore to a strip of Town of Brookhaven parkland running between this park and the west side of Cupsogue Beach County Park, which occupies both ends of Moriches Inlet.

The Fire Island Wilderness Visitor Center is located at the southernmost end of William Floyd Parkway, adjacent to Smith Point County Park. This is Fire Island National Seashore's eastern gateway to the Otis Pike Fire Island High Dune Wilderness, the only federally designated wilderness area in New York State.

== TWA Flight 800 International Memorial ==
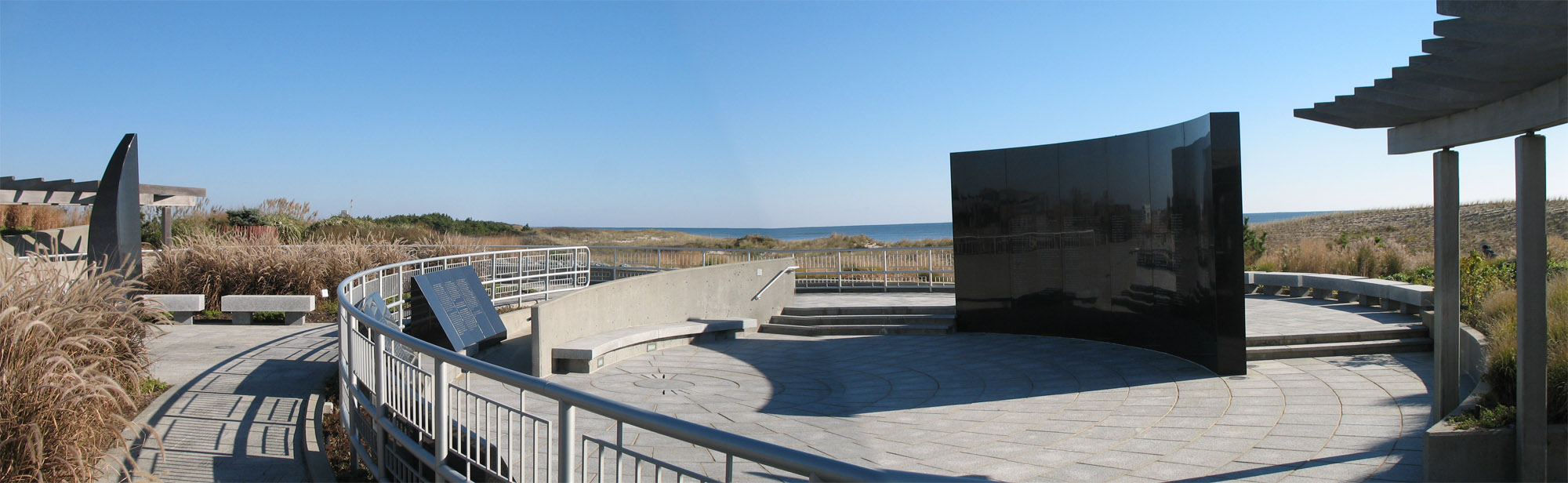
TWA Flight 800 Memorial

On July 17, 1996, TWA Flight 800, a Boeing 747-131 en route from New York City to Paris, France and Rome, Italy, crashed at sea 14 miles (23 km) away from the park; all passengers and crew were killed.

The TWA Flight 800 International Memorial was dedicated in a two-acre (8,100 m^{2}) parcel immediately adjoining the main pavilion at the park on July 14, 2004. Funds for the memorial were raised by the Families of TWA Flight 800 Association. The memorial includes landscaped grounds and flags from the 13 countries of the victims. The curved black granite memorial has names engraved on one side and an illustration on the other of a wave releasing 230 seagulls into the sky. In July 2006 the association added an abstract design of a 10-foot-high (3.0 m) lighthouse in black granite designed by Harry Edward Seaman, who had lost a cousin in the crash. The lighthouse sits above a tomb holding many of the victims' personal belongings.

== Hurricane Sandy ==
High tides and storm surge associated with Hurricane Sandy in October 2012 caused several new inlets to form within and near Smith Point County Park. One breach occurred on the east end of the park itself near Moriches Inlet, while a second breach occurred further west on Fire Island at Old Inlet within the Otis Pike Fire Island High Dune Wilderness. A third breach occurred across Moriches Inlet just inside of Cupsogue Beach County Park. Both breaches that occurred outside of the wilderness area, including the breach within Smith Point County Park, were quickly closed by multimillion-dollar dredging projects. The third breach at Old Inlet remained open while National Park Service officials debated whether to tamper with an event inside a wilderness area. The breach largely closed on its own in late 2022, 10 years after it formed, as has happened naturally at Old Inlet in the past. However, it is technically not fully closed, as some intermittent flow continues to occur.

== See also ==
- Outer Barrier
- Smith Point Bridge
- Great South Bay
- Moriches Bay
