= County Route 46 (Suffolk County, New York) =

County road in Suffolk County, New York, US

County Route 46
- William Floyd Parkway
- Map of Suffolk County on Long Island with CR 46 highlighted in red

Route information
- Maintained by SCDPW
- Length: 15.37 mi (24.74 km)
- Existed: March 30, 1931–present

Major junctions
- South end: CR 75 in Smith Point Park
- CR 80 in Shirley; NY 27 / CR 56 in Shirley; I-495 in Upton; NY 25 in Ridge
- North end: NY 25A in East Shoreham

Location
- Country: United States
- State: New York
- County: Suffolk

Highway system
- County routes in New York; County Routes in Suffolk County
← CR 45	→ CR 47

County Route 46 (CR 46) is a major county road in eastern Suffolk County, New York, in the United States. It runs south-to-north from CR 75 in Smith Point County Park (part of the Fire Island National Seashore) to New York State Route 25A (NY 25A) near the border of Shoreham and Wading River. The road is known as the William Floyd Parkway along its entire length, and is named after William Floyd, a Long Island native and a signer of the United States Declaration of Independence. Despite its "parkway" designation within the State of New York, the road is open to commercial vehicles.

== Route description ==
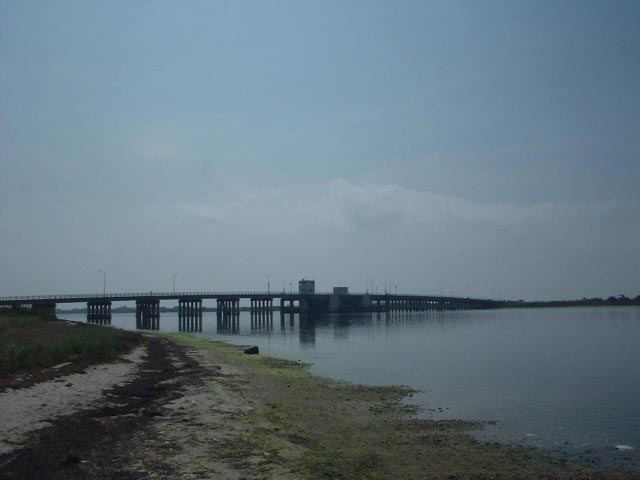
The bridge over the Great South Bay in Smith Point County Park

CR 46 begins at a traffic circle with (now unsigned) CR 75 in Smith Point County Park within the town of Brookhaven. A short distance north of the traffic circle, CR 46, known as the William Floyd Parkway, crosses past a large parking lot for Smith Point Beach, as well as several tennis courts and a basketball court. The route then proceeds northward to cross the Great South Bay on a bascule lift bridge and soon onto mainland Long Island. After crossing onto the mainland, CR 46 becomes a divided four-lane boulevard with a wide grass median past several bayside residential communities. Bending north through several residential neighborhoods of Smith Point, the route crosses into the community of Shirley near Coraci Boulevard.

CR 46 crosses northeast through Shirley, passing a large commercial strip through the village and an at-grade interchange with Stuart Road. Just north of Tudor Road, the route crosses past several intersections with semi-circles in the center of Shirley, soon crossing the Long Island Rail Road Montauk Branch at-grade next to the Mastic-Shirley station. Expanding to eight lanes, CR 46 crosses a junction with Montauk Highway (CR 80). The parkway condenses to six lanes for a short distance northwest of the junction before reaching a cloverleaf interchange with NY 27 (Sunrise Highway) in Shirley. After Sunrise Highway, CR 46 crosses north as a four-lane boulevard through the East Yaphank section of Shirley.

Passing Brookhaven Airport, CR 46 passes a lighted interchange with the airport access road just south of a campus for Dowling College. A distance north, the route crosses an intersection with Moriches-Middle Island Road, then crossing over the lone railroad track of the Long Island Rail Road's Main Line near an interchange for Ramsey Road and Suffolk County Police Department's Seventh Precinct. Just north of Ramsey Road, CR 46 encounters a large cloverleaf with exit 68 of the Long Island Expressway (I-495). After the interchange, William Floyd Parkway becomes a four-lane boulevard through a wooded section of the town of Brookhaven, soon reaching the Yaphank Woods Road development. Crossing Longwood Road/Princeton Avenue (which provides access to Brookhaven National Laboratory), the parkway bends northeast through a mix of wooded and residential sections. The route bends northward and enters a cloverleaf interchange with NY 25 (Middle Country Road).

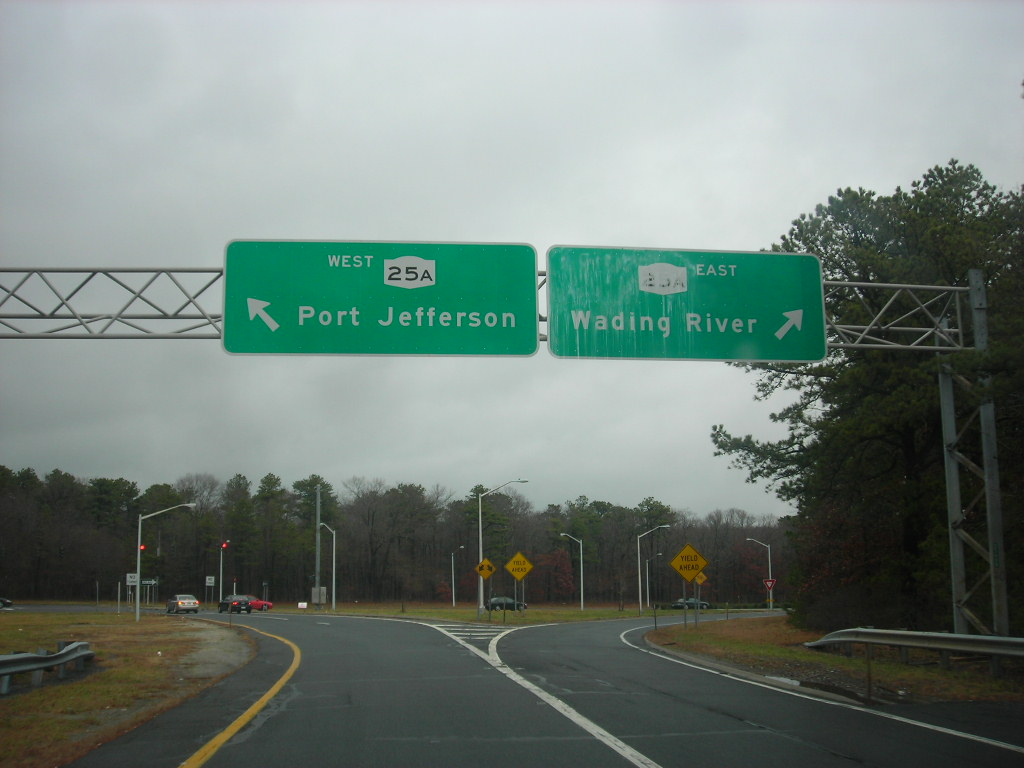
William Floyd Parkway at the junction with NY 25A in East Shoreham

Now in the Ridge section of the Town of Brookhaven, the parkway becomes semi-residential, passing multiple developments and an entrance to Brookhaven State Park near the junction with Whiskey Road. A large center median divides the lanes as the route crosses along the western extents of Brookhaven State Park, crossing into East Shoreham near the border with Wading River. Upon leaving the outskirts of the park, CR 46 enters an interchange with NY 25A. This interchange marks the northern terminus of CR 46 and the William Floyd Parkway.

== History ==
=== Original ambitions ===
The William Floyd Parkway originally was going to include segments of two different formerly proposed state parkways: the Smith Point Spur and the Wildwood Spur.

- The Smith Point Spur was to begin at the traffic circle in Smith Point County Park, and run as far north as what was then the never-built Southern State Parkway extension, but instead became Sunrise Highway (NY 27). The traffic circle was originally intended for an extension of Ocean Parkway, but instead remains for CR 75 (which is now unsigned) to this day.
- The Wildwood Spur was intended to begin at the never-built North Fork Extension of the Northern State Parkway, cross over NY 25A, then curve eastbound, winding through the hills of Shoreham and Wading River, until finally reaching Wildwood State Park.

=== The road as built ===
The section that was originally supposed to be a Smith Point Parkway Spur was a two lane highway with flanking frontage roads until the mid-1970s when this section was widened. Near the vicinity of the Montauk Branch of the Long Island Rail Road, a series of intersections known as "The Circles" were built on the south side of the tracks. Some sections of these roads were turned over to developers. Today, the only segment that is two lanes wide is the Smith Point Bridge.

Camp Upton Road was originally part of CR 46, until NY 27 (Sunrise Highway) was extended through the area in 1957, and an interchange was built for a realigned section. North of Sunrise Highway, the road runs alongside Brookhaven Airport.

CR 46A was the original designation for the alignment along the west side of Brookhaven National Laboratory between Yaphank-Moriches Road and south of the interchange with NY 25. It was eventually integrated into CR 46 while the old CR 46 (Upton Road) was abandoned to both the lab and private developers. The interchange with the Long Island Expressway was built at the geographic center of Long Island. Few people know for certain which part of it is the center, but some believe it is located on the northeast quadrant of the interchange. The cloverleaf intersection features collector-distributor roads on the Long Island Expressway, an upgrade from the typical cloverleaf interchange that was originally designed for the site. Far off the northwest corner of this interchange is the site of the former Suffolk Meadows horse racing track, which today stands as the site of a housing development project.

The median widens at the intersection of Longwood Road (former CR 24) and the entrance to Brookhaven National Laboratory. This occurs to allow space for what was planned to be a diamond interchange. Other formerly proposed interchanges in the area include an extension of CR 101, and the unbuilt CR 102.

North of the interchange with NY 25 in Ridge, there was to be another interchange with CR 111. From there, the median widened once again, as the William Floyd Parkway intersects with the eastern terminus of Whiskey Road and the west side of Brookhaven State Park, which was formerly part of Brookhaven Labs until the mid-1970s. North of the Whiskey Road intersection, there are no other roads or interchanges until the terminus at NY 25A. This northernmost section of highway is quite wide, with U-turn ramps available for turnarounds. The intersection at NY 25A, which was originally proposed to be an interchange, now features channelized turns and two separate traffic light controls due to the extremely wide median of CR 46.

=== Bridge to Connecticut ===
A map showing the built segment of the William Floyd Parkway (black), which would have been upgraded to become part of I-91, and the unbuilt extension to I-91's current terminus in New Haven via the unbuilt New Haven–Shoreham Bridge (red)
'"`UNIQ--templatestyles-0000002F-QINU`"''"`UNIQ--templatestyles-00000030-QINU`"'

Besides the proposed spur to Wildwood State Park, there was intended to be an extension to a new bridge across Long Island Sound to either New Haven or East Haven, Connecticut, between the 1950s and 1970s. Upon completion of the bridge, CR 46 would be transferred to the New York State Department of Transportation (NYSDOT) in exchange for NY 25A. NYSDOT would then upgrade the roadway to Interstate Highway standards, allowing Interstate 91 (I-91) to continue southward from New Haven, its current southern terminus, to usurp CR 46. These plans were ultimately mothballed in 1979, after a study for this project was conducted.

Following this, the option of a connection to a proposed ferry port between the New Haven and Shoreham-Wading River areas was proposed. However, the plans to implement these cross-sound ferry services were ultimately mothballed as well.

Despite the cancellation of the bridge, many Long Islanders remain in favor of constructing one. In 2000, a survey was conducted by News12 and Newsday, which found that the majority (63 percent) of Long Islanders supported such a project.

In 2016, the proposal of a New Haven–Shoreham crossing was again renewed by Governor Andrew M. Cuomo, either as a bridge or as a tunnel. However, NYSDOT announced in 2018 that they would not be moving forward with the project.

== Major intersections ==
Location	mi	km	Destinations	Notes
Smith Point County Park	0.00	0.00	CR 75 east – TWA Flight Memorial, Fire Island	Roundabout; southern terminus; western terminus of CR 75; to Otis Pike Fire Island High Dune Wilderness
Narrow Bay	0.24– 0.47	0.39– 0.76	Smith Point Bridge	
Shirley	4.80	7.72	CR 80 (Montauk Highway) – Patchogue, Moriches	Former NY 27A
Shirley	5.03– 5.15	8.10– 8.29	NY 27 / CR 56 west (Victory Avenue) – New York, Montauk	Eastern terminus of CR 56; exits 58S-N on NY 27
Yaphank	8.01	12.89	I-495 (Long Island Expressway) – New York, Riverhead	Cloverleaf interchange; exits 68S-N on I-495
Upton	9.63	15.50	Longwood Road / Princeton Avenue – Brookhaven National Laboratory	
Ridge	11.97	19.26	NY 25 (Middle Country Road) – New York, Riverhead, Calverton Cemetery	Cloverleaf interchange
East Shoreham	15.37	24.74	NY 25A – Port Jefferson, Wading River	Northern terminus
1.000 mi = 1.609 km; 1.000 km = 0.621 mi
