= Cupsogue Beach County Park =

Park in New York, United States

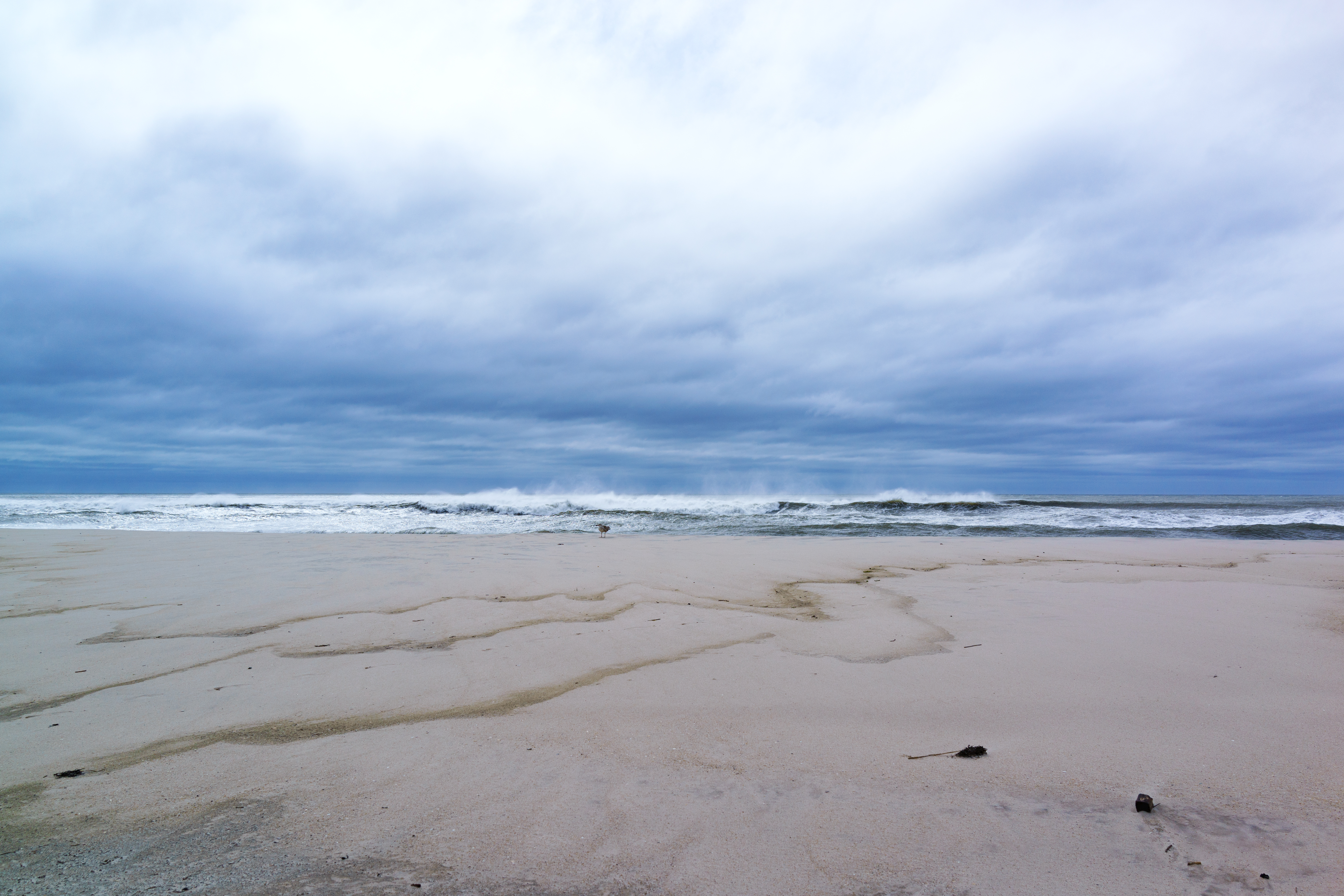
- View of part of Cupsogue Beach County Park during Hurricane Jose.

- Location within New York
- Interactive map of Cupsogue Beach County Park
- Type: Regional park
- Location: Town of Brookhaven, Suffolk County, New York
- Nearest city: West Hampton Dunes
- Coordinates: 40°46′16″N 72°44′14″W
- Area: 296 acres (1.20 km^{2})
- Open: Seasonal

Cupsogue Beach County Park is a 296-acre (1.20 km^{2}) park at the eastern end of Fire Island and the western end of Westhampton Island, known locally as Dune Road, one of Long Island's easternmost barrier islands. The Atlantic Ocean, Moriches Inlet and Moriches Bay surround the park.

== Location ==
Though the park exists on both sides of the Moriches Inlet and is located entirely within the Town of Brookhaven, it is only accessible from the western terminus of Dune Road, which itself is in the Town of Southampton. The closest bridge to the park is for Jessup Lane in the village of Westhampton Beach between Moriches Bay and Moneybogue Bay. The park's eastern border is the Brookhaven/Southampton town line and the village of West Hampton Dunes.

== Park description ==
This 296-acre (1.20 km^{2}) barrier beach park offers lifeguard-supervised swimming, sunbathing, fishing, scuba diving, and special events. A food concession, restrooms, a first aid center (staffed by an EMT during the summer months), showers and changing rooms are all situated at Cupsogue's pavilion. Camping and recreational vehicles are permitted along the access road running parallel to the outer beach. Diving is permitted at slack tide on the bay side of the park only, where the water depth is approximately 12 feet (3.7 m).

Most facilities at the park can be found on the east side of Moriches Inlet. The segment of the park on the west side is preserved land that is divided by a strip of town parkland separating Cupsogue from Smith Point County Park.

This park is home to many piping plovers, a federally-protected shorebird.

== History ==
Dated from the 1690s, the Native American word Cupsogue means "a closed inlet". The park's land was entirely part of Fire Island until a 1931 Nor'easter created the Moriches Inlet, which enlarged between 1933 and 1938. The Suffolk County Parks Department acquired the park in the 1950s, and by the 1970s Cupsogue Beach County Park was given a pavilion and boardwalk.

A breach connecting the Atlantic Ocean and Moriches Bay occurred on the east end of the park as a result of high tides during Hurricane Sandy in 2012. The breach widened from 150 feet (46 m) to 300 feet (91 m) less than a week later when a Nor'easter hit. Officials closed the breach with a $6 million project that pumped in 200,000 cubic yards (150,000 m^{3}) of sand.

In 2014, The Beach Hut at Cupsogue Beach was destroyed in a large blaze that engulfed the entire shack.

In 2025 Burma Road has been reopened completely to the inlet once again for the first time in over 10 years including the outer beach and rebuilt the bayside beach. In 2026 Cupsogue has opened a brand new pavilion featuring all the amenities the original pavilion has offered with the exception of a changing rooms. The Beach House is also the new tenant offering a concession stand and an outdoor bar overlooking both the ocean and the bay. It now has a wrap around deck and a sunset view stage.

Preceded by West Hampton Dunes	The Hamptons	Succeeded by Southernmost Point
