= Mastic–Shirley station =

Long Island Rail Road station in Suffolk County, New York

Mastic–Shirley
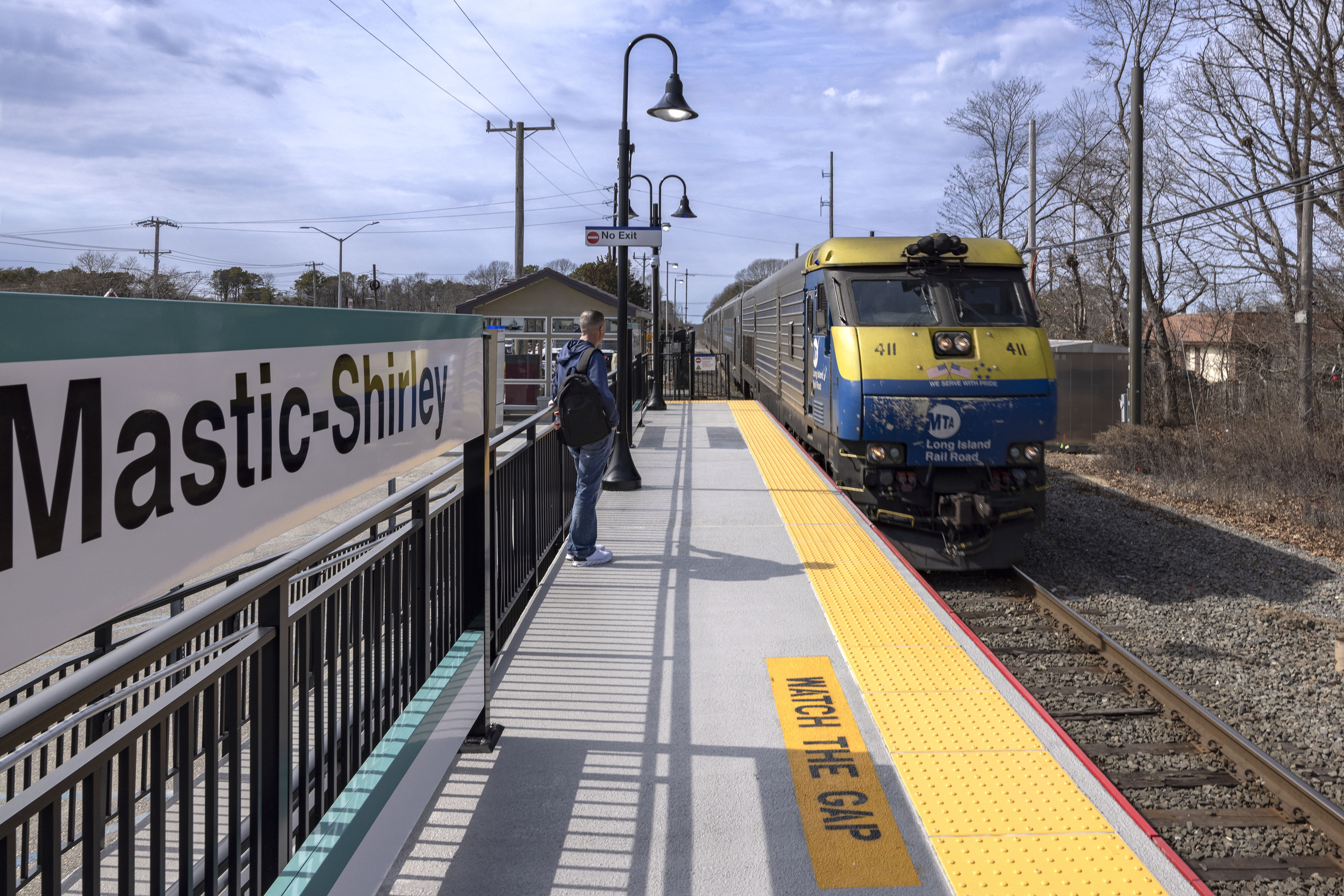
- The Mastic-Shirley station in March 2025, looking west

General information
- Location: William Floyd Parkway & Northern Boulevard; Shirley, New York
- Coordinates: 40.7989°N 72.86454°W
- Owner: Long Island Rail Road
- Platforms: 1 side platform
- Tracks: 1
- Connections: Suffolk County Transit: 66

Construction
- Parking: Yes
- Cycle facilities: Yes
- Accessible: Yes

Other information
- Station code: MSY
- Fare zone: 12

History
- Opened: July 7, 1960
- Rebuilt: 2023–2025

Passengers
- 2012—2014: 605 per weekday
- Rank: 91 of 125

Services
Preceding station	Long Island Rail Road	Following station
Bellport toward Penn Station or Long Island City	Montauk Branch limited service	Speonk toward Montauk
Location

Mastic–Shirley is a station on the Long Island Rail Road's Montauk Branch in Shirley, New York, located off William Floyd Parkway. The station has two ticket machines.

== History ==
Mastic–Shirley station was built as a replacement for the former Mastic station (originally named Forge) built in 1882 and located 7,010 feet (2.14 km) east on Mastic Road. Service for the Mastic–Shirley train station began July 7, 1960. The station house at Mastic was torn down a month later. When Center Moriches station was eliminated by the LIRR on March 16, 1998, Mastic–Shirley was one of two stations recommended for use as a substitute by the patrons of the now-closed station – the other was Speonk.

The station was extensively renovated between 2023 and 2025. As part of the $7.5-million reconstruction project, the platform was rehabilitated, new station lighting, signage, fixtures, and finishes were added, a new sidewalk & plaza were constructed, and the station house was converted into an open-air shelter, featuring historic images of the station and the surrounding area.

== Station layout ==
The station has one four-car-long high-level platform on the south side of the single track. JJD interlocking (formerly MS), a remote-controlled siding where trains can pass each other, is located east of the station.

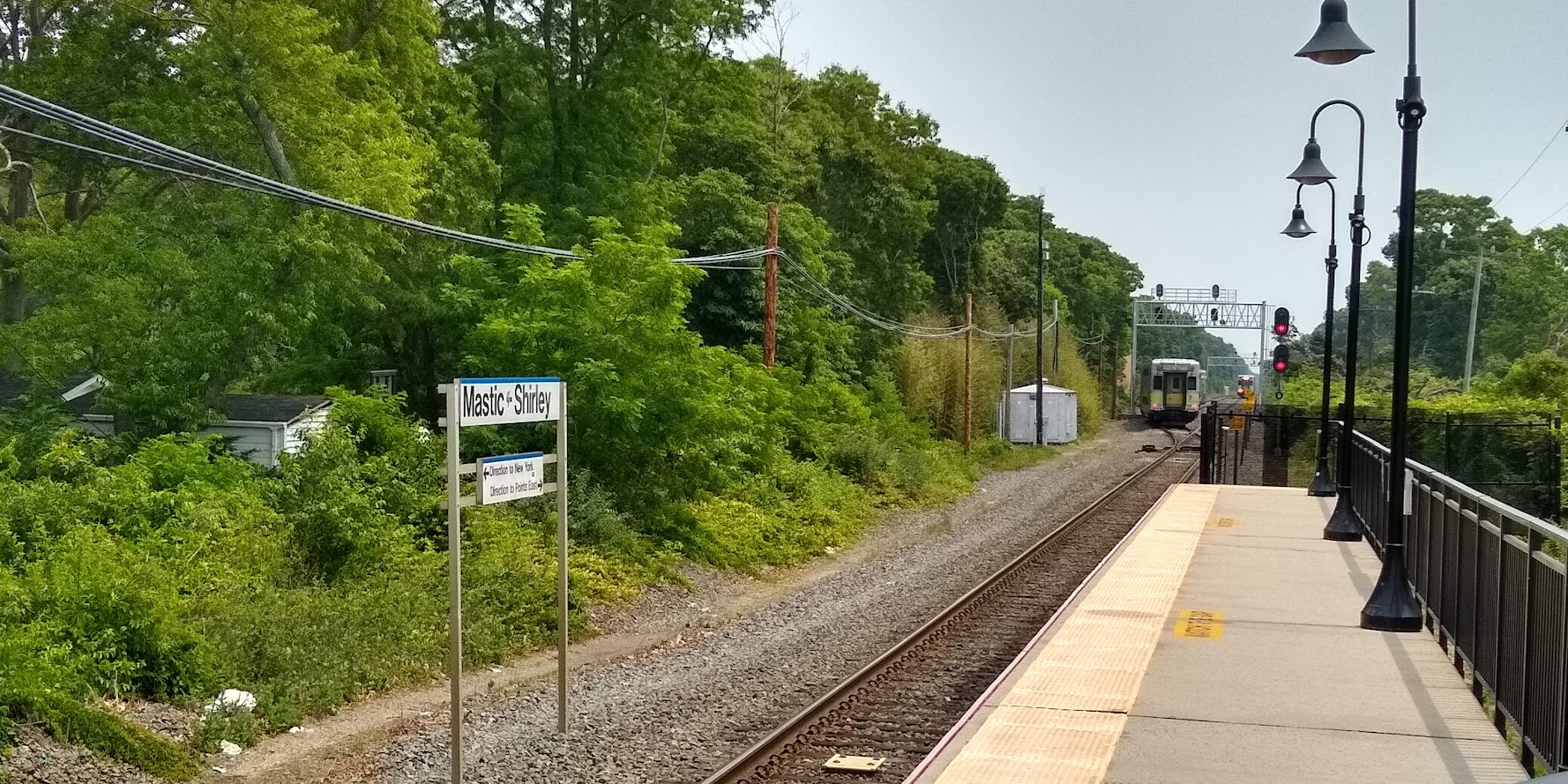
Two trains passing each other at the siding east of the station

== Notable places nearby ==
- Fire Island National Seashore
- Poospatuck Reservation
- Southaven County Park
- Smith Point County Park
- Brookhaven National Laboratory
- Brookhaven Airport
