= Brookhaven State Park =

State park in Suffolk County, New York

- Location within New York
- Interactive map of Brookhaven State Park
- Type: State park (undeveloped)
- Location: Wading River, NY, USA
- Coordinates: 40°55′20″N 72°52′00″W
- Area: 1,638 acres (6.63 km^{2})
- Established: 1971
- Operator: New York State Office of Parks, Recreation and Historic Preservation
- Visitors: 71,672 (in 2024)

Brookhaven State Park is a 1,638-acre (6.63 km^{2}) state park in Wading River and Ridge, New York, approximately 74 miles (119 km) east of New York City. Established in 1971, the park land was formerly the property of Brookhaven National Laboratory. Protecting a large amount of the Long Island Pine Barrens, the park also contains scattered wetlands.

Brookhaven State Park is located along the east side William Floyd Parkway, between NY 25 and NY 25A. The park contains 25 miles (40 km) of multi-use trails.

== See also ==
- List of New York state parks
