= Watch Hill (New York) =

Campground and marina on Fire Island, New York

Coordinates: 40°41′25.5″N 72°59′20″W

Watch Hill is a part of the Fire Island National Seashore on Fire Island.

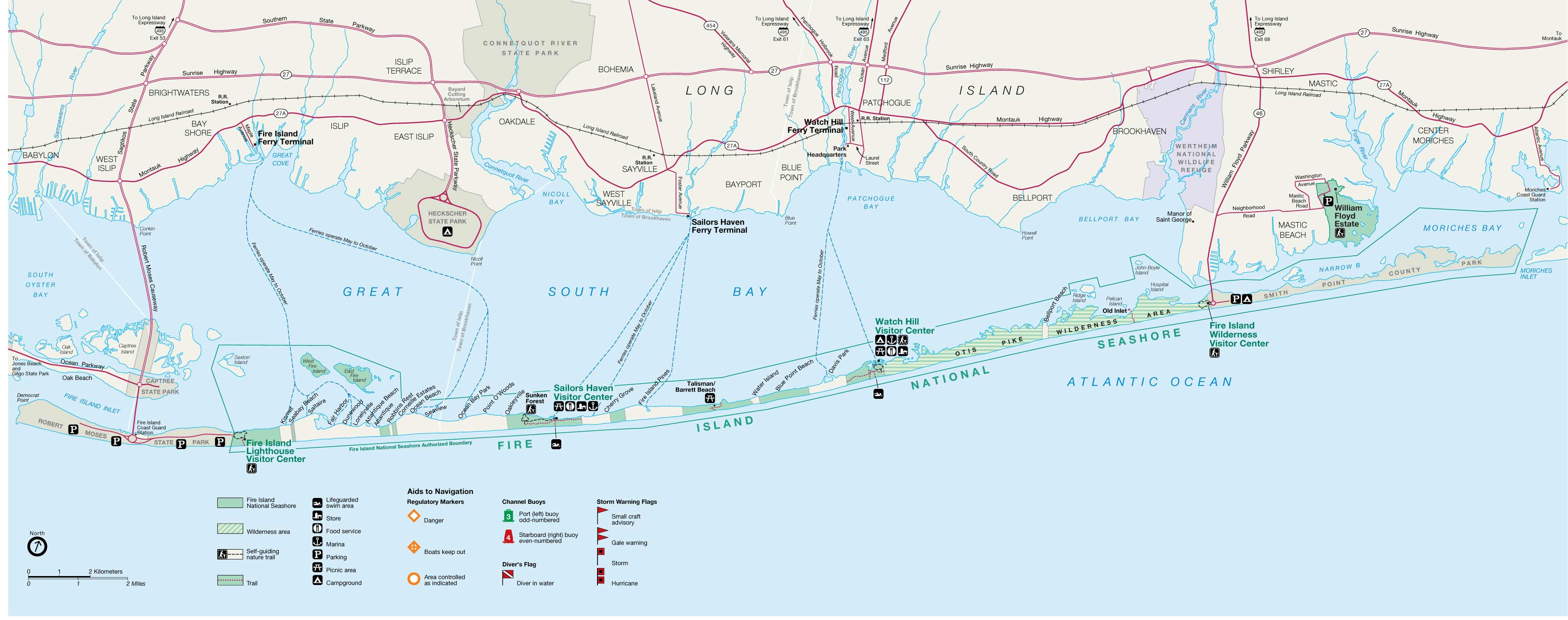
Map of the Fire Island National Seashore showing the location of Watch Hill.

Watch Hill is a campground and marina located on Fire Island, a barrier island off the south shore of New York's Long Island. The park is located across the Great South Bay from Patchogue and is contained within the Fire Island National Seashore.

Watch Hill is located on the western edge of the 1,363-acre (5.52 km^{2}) Otis Pike Fire Island High Dune Wilderness, the only federally designated wilderness area in the State of New York, containing a variety of barrier island ecosystems in relatively undisturbed condition.

== Description ==
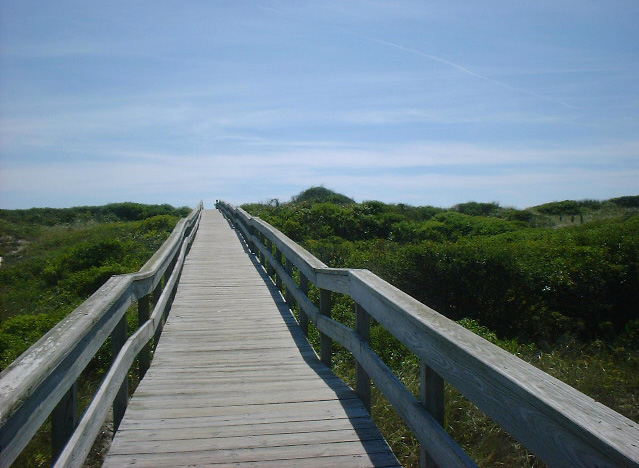
Boardwalk at Watch Hill

The park offers a variety of outdoor experiences, ranging from ocean swimming to back country hiking to bird watching. Watch Hill contains a marina, a small general store, snack bar, tiki bar, Whalehouse Point Restaurant and Bar, visitor center, nature trail, and seasonally lifeguarded beaches. In September 2019, the building containing the restaurant, snack bar, and tiki bar was destroyed by a fire. The general store and welcome center were unaffected. Campground facilities include running water, grills, showers and bathrooms. The campground contains 27 sand sites, including one that is universally accessible and a group campsite. Starting 2019, four glamping platform tents or preset campsites will become available for more comfortable camping.

=== Access ===
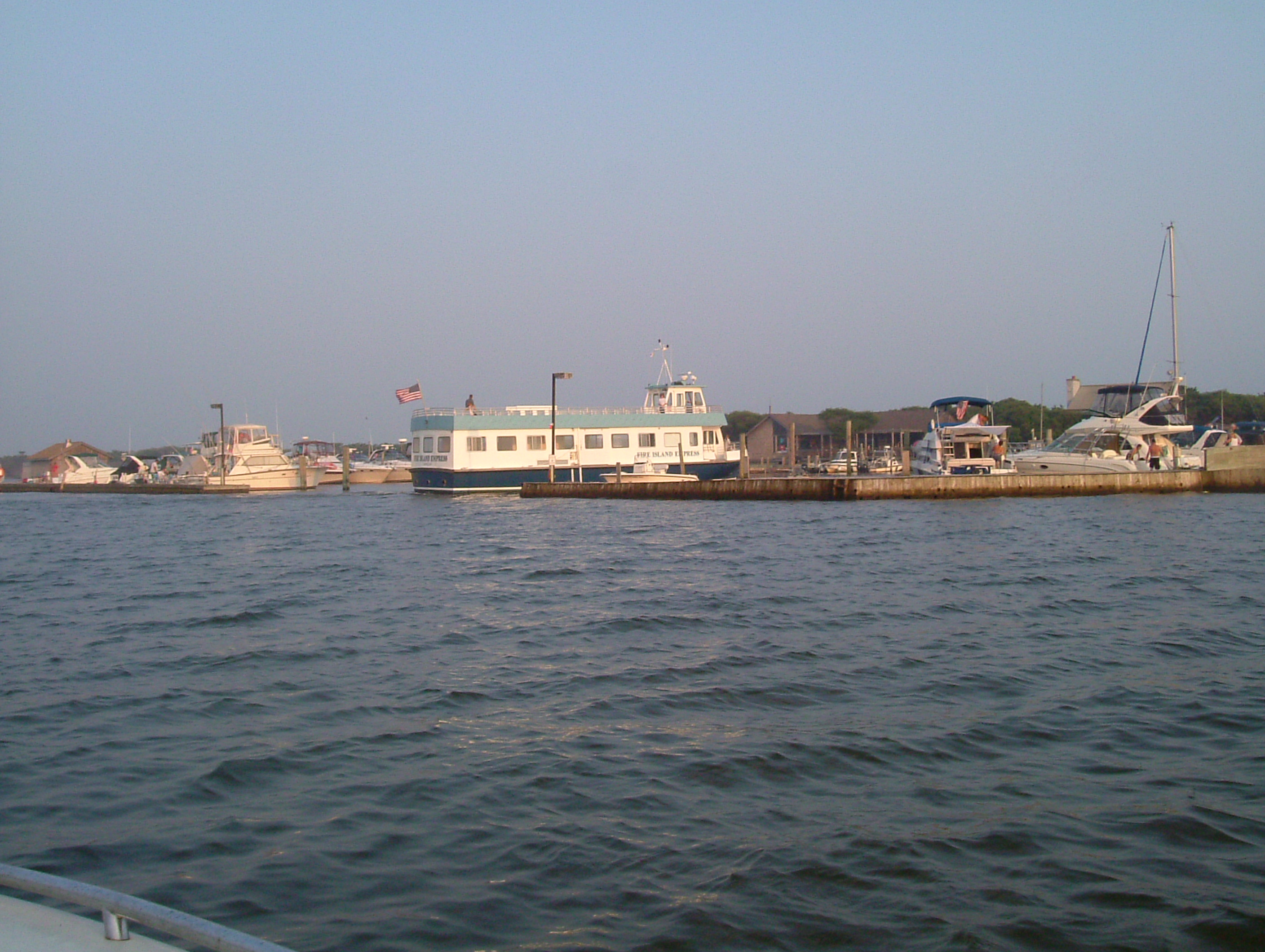
Watch Hill ferry

Watch Hill is not accessible by car and is open seasonally by ferry via The Watch Hill Ferry Terminal at 160 West Avenue in Patchogue, or by private watercraft.

== See also ==
- Davis Park, New York
- Cherry Grove, New York
