= Clam Pond =

Cove in Suffolk County, New York

Coordinates: 40°38′26″N 73°11′24″W

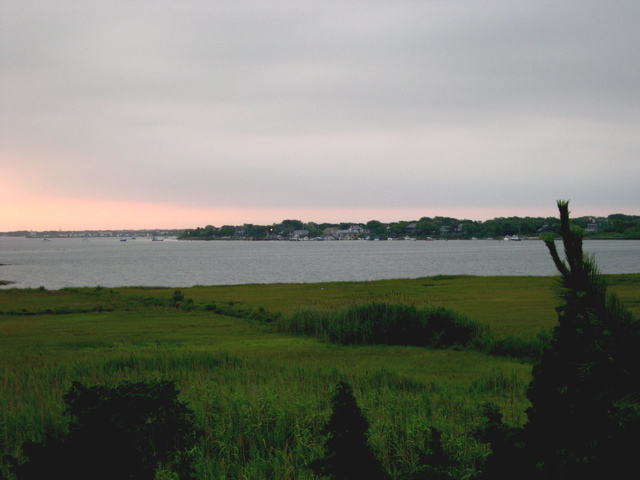
Clam Pond at sunrise, summer 2004.

Clam Pond, also known as Clam Pond Cove, is a small cove in the Great South Bay, on the north side of Fire Island between Saltaire and Fair Harbor in Suffolk County, New York. It is a popular spot for kayaking and small boat sailing.
