= Fire Island National Seashore =

National park system unit in New York, United States

- IUCN category V (protected landscape/seascape)
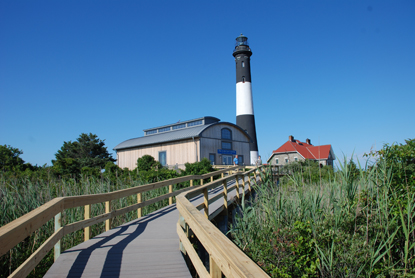
- Fire Island Lighthouse

- Location within New York Location within the United States
- Interactive map of Fire Island National Seashore
- Location: Fire Island, New York, United States
- Nearest city: Patchogue, New York
- Coordinates: 40°41′47″N 72°58′58″W
- Length: 26 mi (42 km)
- Area: 19,579 acres (79.23 km^{2}; 30.592 sq mi)
- Established: September 11, 1964
- Visitors: 393,749 (in 2022)
- Governing body: National Park Service
- Website: Fire Island National Seashore

Fire Island National Seashore (FINS) is a United States National Seashore that protects a 26-mile (42 km) section of Fire Island, an approximately 30-mile (48 km) long and 0.5-mile (0.80 km) wide barrier island separated from Long Island by the Great South Bay. The island is part of New York State's Suffolk County and the Outer Barrier.

There are 17 private communities within the boundaries of Fire Island National Seashore including Saltaire, Fire Island Pines, and Ocean Beach. Only two bridges lead to Fire Island and the national seashore and there are no public roads within the seashore itself. The Robert Moses Causeway leads to Robert Moses State Park on the western end of Fire Island while the William Floyd Parkway leads to the eastern end of the island. The seashore can also be accessed by private boat or by ferry from the communities of Patchogue, Sayville, and Bay Shore on Long Island.

Fire Island National Seashore was established as a unit of the National Park Service on September 11, 1964.

A separate unit of Fire Island National Seashore located on Long Island protects the home and estate of William Floyd, an American Revolutionary War general and a signer of the Declaration of Independence. The William Floyd House is listed on the National Register of Historic Places and is located in Mastic Beach, New York.

== Attractions ==
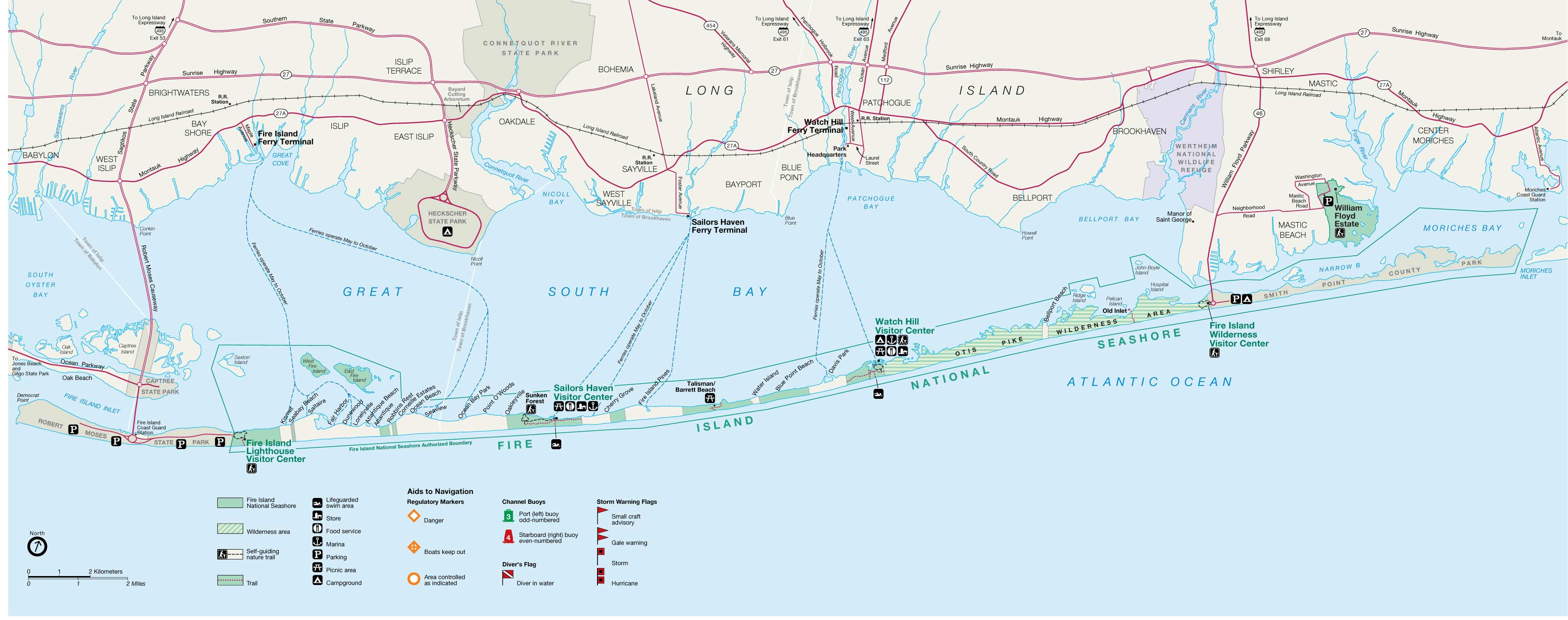
Map of the Fire Island National Seashore.

- The Fire Island Light is located near the western end of the seashore near Robert Moses State Park.
- Lighthouse Beach is a beach at the extreme west end of the seashore, just east of Robert Moses State Park. Since 2013, a nudity ban has been enforced at this former clothing optional beach.
- Sailor's Haven is home to a popular 1.5 miles (2.4 km) boardwalk trail through an area known as the Sunken Forest as well as a visitor center, general store, and a public marina.
- Otis Pike Fire Island High Dune Wilderness, located on the eastern end of Fire Island, is the only federally designated U.S. Wilderness Area in New York State.

== Wilderness area ==
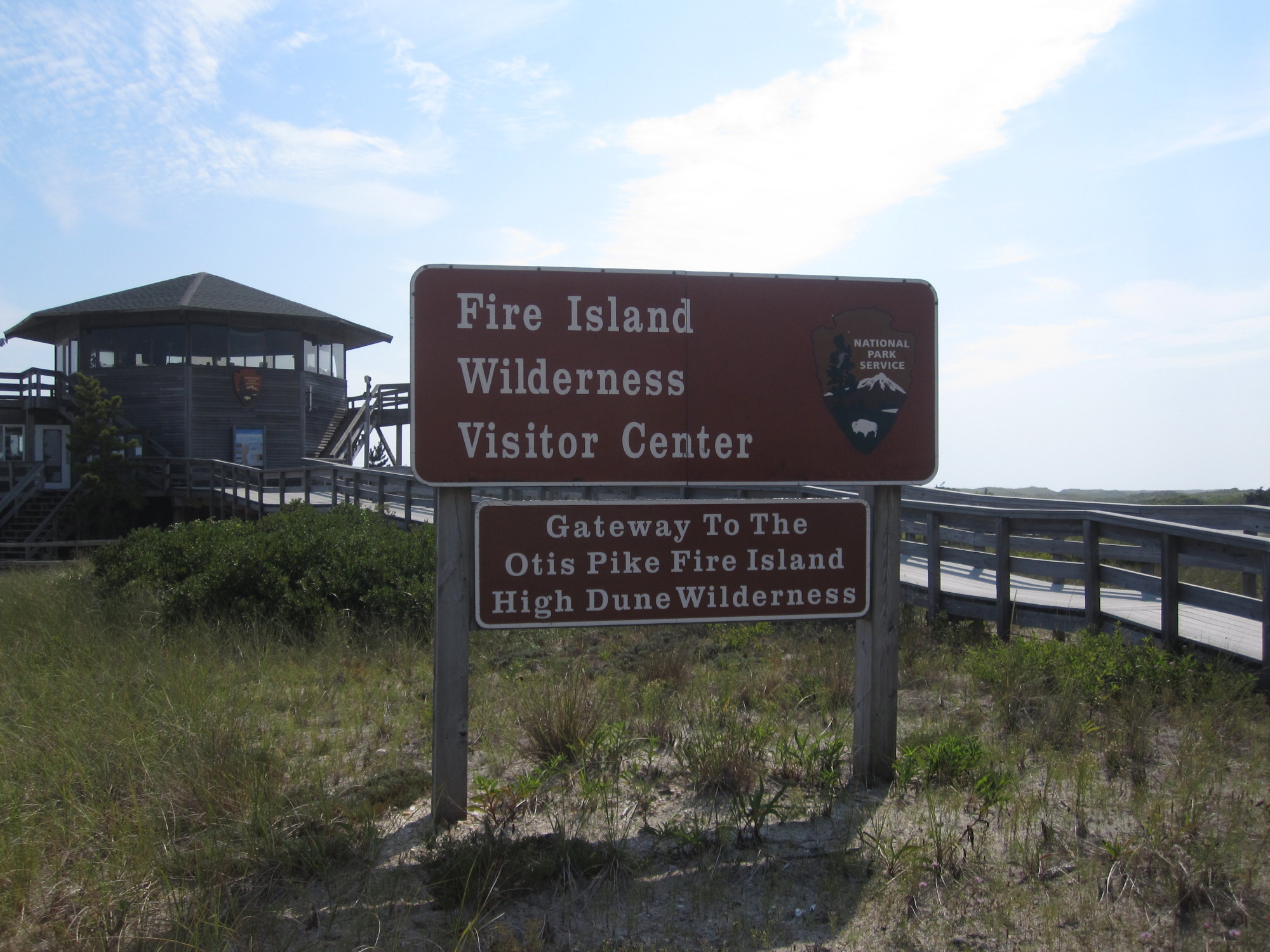
Visitor center

The Otis Pike Fire Island High Dune Wilderness, also known as Fire Island Wilderness, is a 1,380-acre (5.6 km^{2}; 2.16 sq mi) wilderness area on Fire Island. It is approximately seven miles (11 km) long and located on the eastern side of Fire Island. The United States Congress designated the Otis Pike High Dune Wilderness Area in 1980. The wilderness area is named for former New York Congressman Otis G. Pike, who co-sponsored the bill which created the Fire Island National Seashore and worked hard to secure public support and the legislation's passage through Congress to establish the new national park. It is the only federally designated wilderness area in New York State and one of the smallest wilderness areas managed by the National Park Service.

The wilderness includes pine forests, grassy wetlands, and dunes that serve as habitat for white-tailed deer, piping plovers, herons and migratory waterfowl. The wilderness area does not technically include the beaches that face the Atlantic Ocean. Hiking, back-country camping, and fishing access are available within the wilderness.

Access to the Otis G. Pike Wilderness can be obtained either from Watch Hill (which is accessible seasonally by ferry or private boat) or Smith Point County Park, accessible year round by car or bus. The Wilderness Visitor Center is located on the eastern edge of the wilderness, adjacent to Smith Point County Park. Privately owned Bellport Beach is located near the central area of the wilderness.

== Old Inlet breach ==
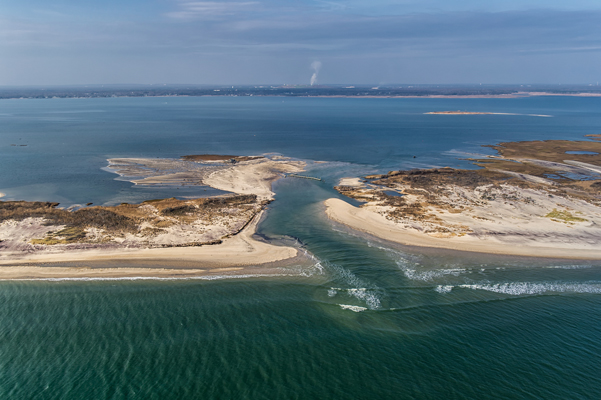
Aerial view of the breach at Old Inlet, looking from the Atlantic Ocean toward Great South Bay, on November 10, 2012.

Old Inlet, just west of Smith Point County Park in the wilderness, has been the site of breaches of Fire Island causing the Atlantic Ocean to join with the Great South Bay.

The most recent breach occurred during the high tides associated with Hurricane Sandy in October 2012. The breach was 276 feet (84 m) wide on the Atlantic side a week after the storm and 856 feet (261 m) wide on April 5, 2013.

National Park Service officials have been debating whether to take action to close the breach. Contingency plans put in place to manage breaches within the wilderness area called for initial monitoring of the breach; as of 2014, the breach has stabilized and monitoring continues. Some residents have called for closure of the breach, due to perceived increases in flooding after the breach's opening. However, the breach has been responsible for increased water quality in Great South Bay, which had been becoming increasingly polluted by suburban runoff prior to the breach's formation, along with repopulation of fish and clams that had been absent from the bay for decades due to pollution.

Officials moved to close two breaches which formed on either side of Moriches Inlet following Hurricane Sandy — one in Cupsogue Beach County Park and the other in Smith Point County Park. A draft plan for action was scheduled to be released in summer 2016. The National Park Service ultimately decided not to take any action and instead let the landscape evolve naturally. By summer 2022, the breach was filling with sand, having shrunk tenfold to less than 100 feet wide. By 2024, Old Inlet had completely closed, nearly 12 years to the day since Super Storm Sandy.

== Fire Island folklore ==
Fire Island has long been the subject of folklore, with its natural landscapes and maritime history inspiring numerous myths and legends over the centuries. A significant portion of this lore is rooted in the island’s association with piracy and shipwrecks, which has led to recurring themes involving lost treasure and ghostly apparitions.

The Fire Island Lighthouse is a focal point in many local legends. One widely circulated story involves the spirits of a lighthouse keeper and his daughter. According to the legend, the daughter fell seriously ill and died before medical assistance could be brought from the mainland. Stricken with grief, the lighthouse keeper is said to have taken his own life by hanging himself in the lighthouse tower. On January 7, 2022, a group of seven paranormal investigators was granted overnight access to the lighthouse to search for evidence of supernatural activity with the supposedly supernatural images and videos they captured later being published by local media.

== See also ==
- Watch Hill, New York --- campground on Fire Island
