= Fire Island Inlet Bridge =

Bridge in United States of America

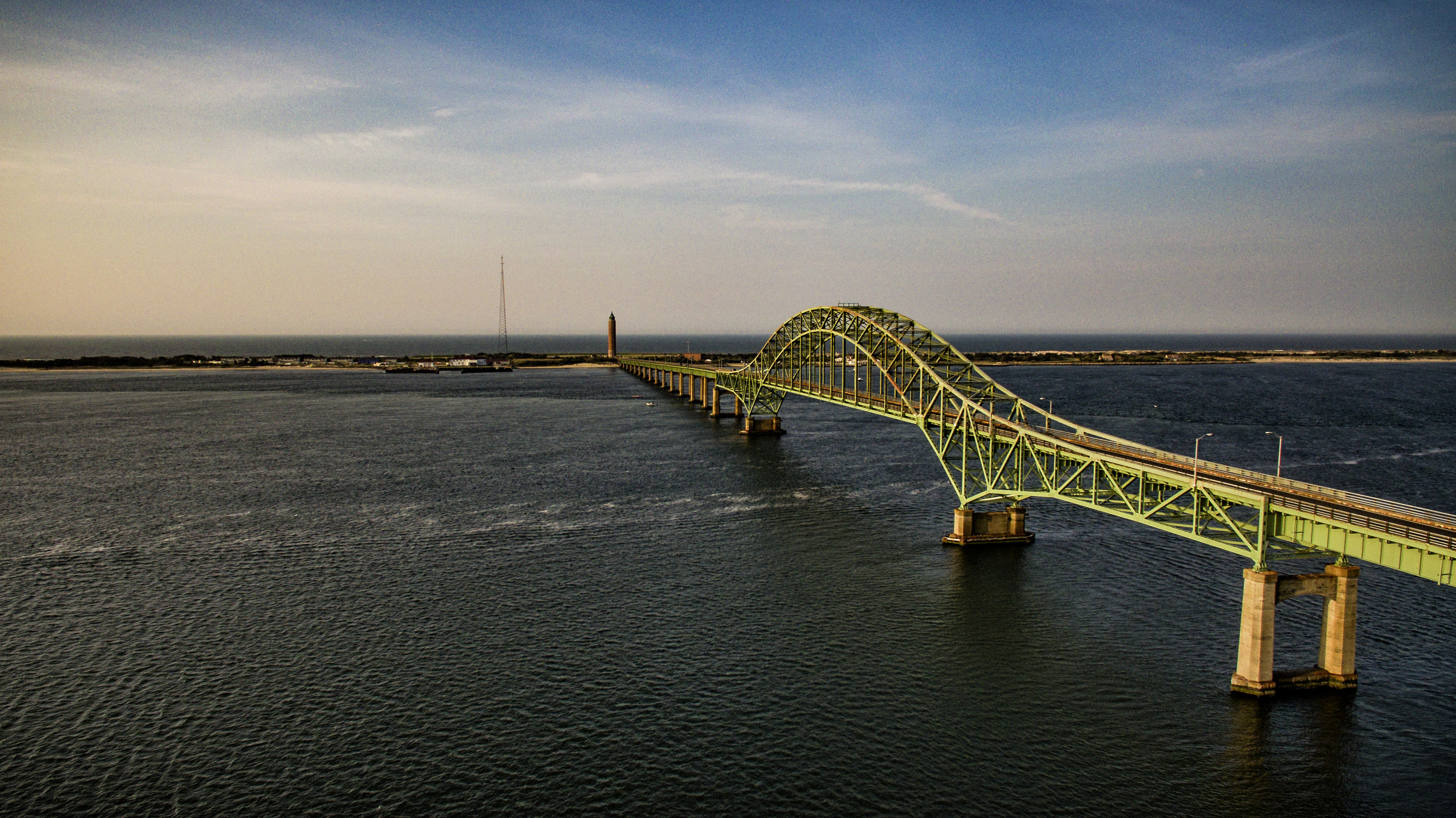
- Fire Island Inlet Bridge
- Coordinates: 40°37′56″N 73°15′46″W
- Carries: Robert Moses Causeway
- Crosses: Fire Island Inlet

Characteristics
- Material: Steel
- Total length: 4,231 feet (1,290 m)
- Width: 2 lane
- Longest span: 601 feet (183 m)

History
- Construction cost: $10 million
- Opened: 1964

Location
- Interactive map of Fire Island Inlet Bridge

The Fire Island Inlet Bridge, an integral part of the Robert Moses Causeway, is a two-lane, steel tied arch span with a concrete deck that carries the parkway over Fire Island Inlet.

Construction of the Fire Island Bridge was completed in 1964 and although a relatively young structure, (about 60 years old), its concrete deck has suffered from severe chloride ingress resulting in cracks, spalling, and the formation of potholes.

The Fire Island Inlet span of the Robert Moses Causeway connects to Robert Moses State Park on the western tip of Fire Island.

The Fire Island Inlet Bridge is located south of the State Boat Channel Bridge, a 665-foot (203 m) long bascule bridge modeled after Brooklyn's Mill Basin Drawbridge.

== History ==
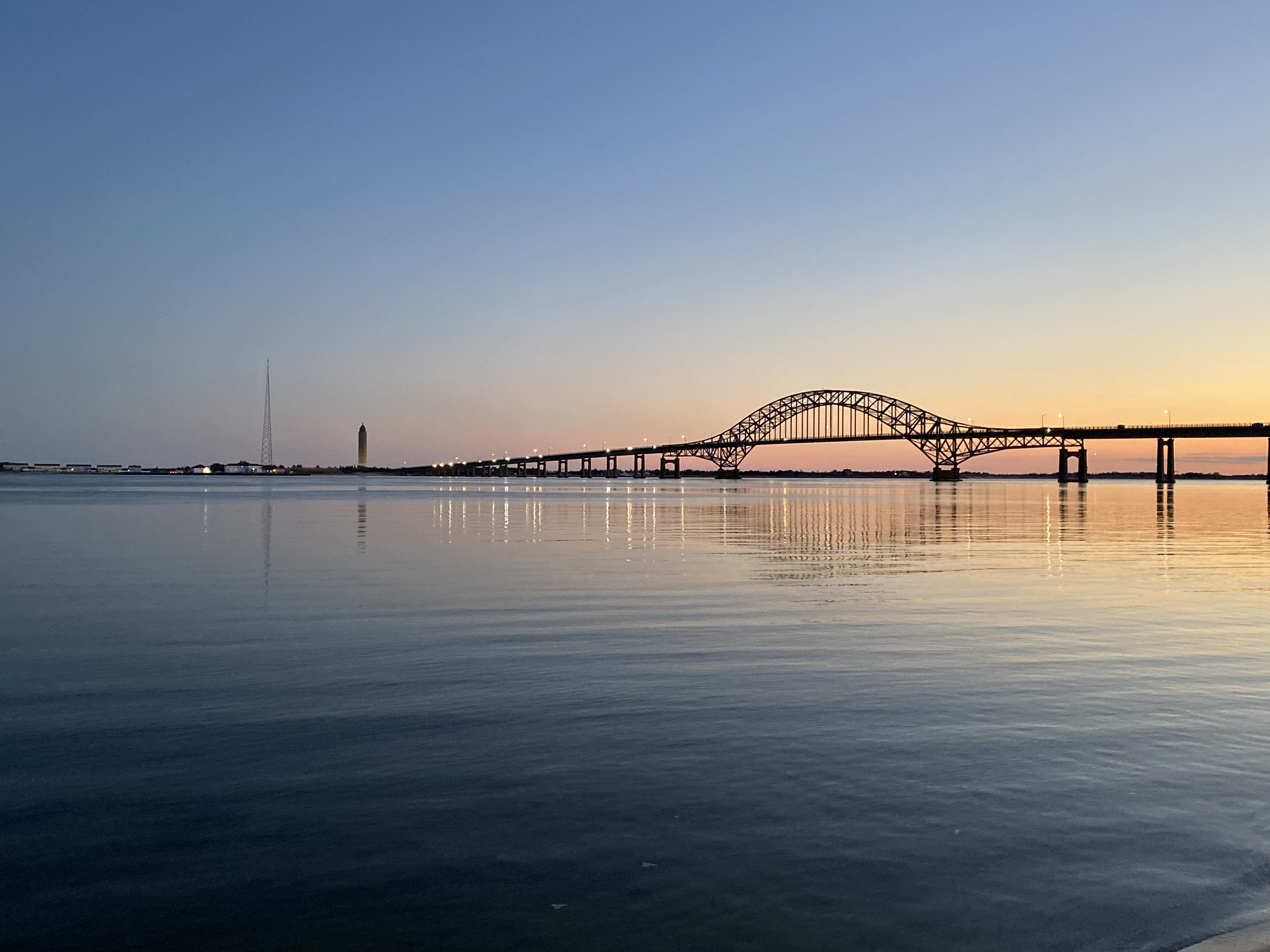
The bridge in 2020

The Fire Island Inlet span cost $10 million to complete and opened to traffic on June 13, 1964. By 1985, a dual span was supposed to be built to alleviate traffic; the second bridge proposal was never implemented. As first proposed in 1938, the span was to be a vertical-lift span with a design similar to that of the Marine Parkway–Gil Hodges Memorial Bridge. The design was changed to conform with that of the Great South Bay Bridge, a 600-foot (180 m) steel-arch span with a 60-foot (18 m) clearance.

In 2004, the New York State Department of Transportation began studies on the Fire Island Inlet span after the realization that it was rapidly decomposing due to flaws in the cement during its construction. A 5-short-ton (4,500 kg) weight restriction was enforced by local police until permanent repairs could be made.

Currently repairs are being undertaken to extend the life and safety of the bridge; groundbreaking for a new bridge was expected in 2010. It is assumed that the new bridge will be built to the west of the current structure; the new span will be four lanes, two southbound and two northbound. The new Fire Island Bridge will keep the look of the old one for aesthetic conformity with the other bridges over the bay.
