= Shirley, New York =

- Hamlet and census-designated place
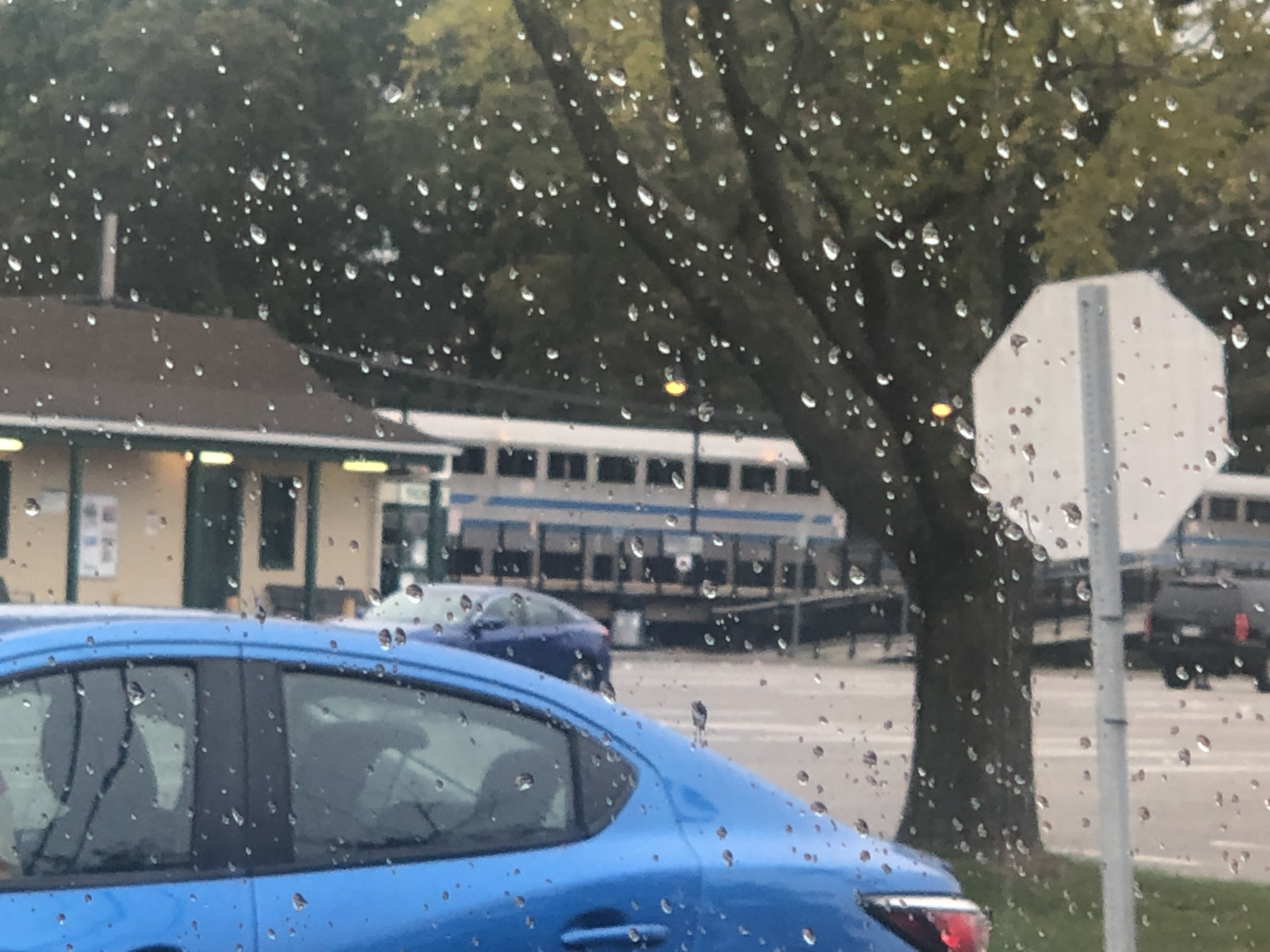
- Mastic-Shirley station
- Motto: Long Island's Best Kept Secret
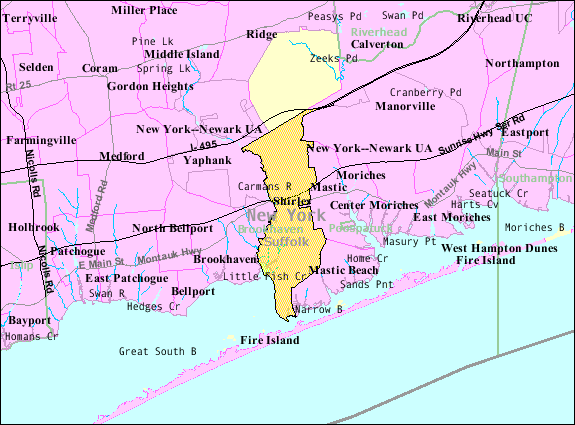

- Location within Long Island Location within New York
- Coordinates: 40°47′49″N 72°52′16″W
- Country: United States
- State: New York
- County: Suffolk
- Town: Brookhaven

Area
  - Total: 12.17 sq mi (31.52 km^{2})
  - Land: 11.31 sq mi (29.30 km^{2})
  - Water: 0.85 sq mi (2.21 km^{2})
- Elevation: 52 ft (16 m)

Population (2020)
  - Total: 26,360
  - Density: 2,329.9/sq mi (899.57/km^{2})
- Time zone: UTC-5 (Eastern (EST))
  - Summer (DST): UTC-4 (EDT)
- ZIP code: 11967
- Area codes: 631, 934
- FIPS code: 36-67070
- GNIS feature ID: 0970601

Shirley is a hamlet (and census-designated place) in Suffolk County, New York, United States. As of the 2020 census, Shirley had a population of 26,360. Shirley is the western terminus of Atlantic Crossing 1, a major submarine telecommunications cable linking the United States with the UK, Germany, and the Netherlands. Soon, the Emerald Express transatlantic communications cable will provide data connectivity between Europe and North America, landing in Shirley.

Shirley is a community in the Town of Brookhaven, on the South Shore of Long Island. It is named for developer Walter T. Shirley, who had the vision in the 1940s to turn the area on Mastic Bay into an affordable enclave. Shirley's company priced its 4,000 four-room homes starting at $4,700, and lots were priced at $295.

Shirley is served by the Mastic–Shirley Long Island Rail Road station. The station was a compromise when both Mastic and Shirley campaigned for it. The Smith Point Bridge is the second of only two bridge crossings from Long Island to Fire Island, allowing beach goers easy access to the ocean without taking a ferry boat.

The 7th Precinct of the Suffolk County Police Department is located in Shirley.

Shirley was once known as Tangiers (named after William "Tangier" Smith) and was home to a few summer bungalows in the early 1900s; most of their owners were from New York City, looking an escape from a vast "urban jungle". Today, most of the "Tangiers-era" still stand, although some were destroyed by hurricanes, winter storms, or arson.

== Geography ==
Shirley is located at 40°47′49″N 72°52′16″W (40.796914, -72.871020).

According to the United States Census Bureau, the CDP has a total area of 11.9 square miles (30.8 km^{2}), of which 11.5 square miles (29.7 km^{2}) is land and 0.42 square miles (1.1 km^{2}), or 3.63%, is water.

East Yaphank is another designation for the northern extent of Shirley. It is part of the USPS ZIP code 11967. The USPS accepts the name Shirley, Smith Point and East Yaphank for this neighborhood.

== Demographics ==
Historical population
Census	Pop.	Note	%±
2020	26,360		—
U.S. Decennial Census

=== 2020 census ===
As of the 2020 census, Shirley had a population of 26,360. The median age was 38.7 years. 22.5% of residents were under the age of 18 and 13.2% of residents were 65 years of age or older. For every 100 females there were 100.4 males, and for every 100 females age 18 and over there were 98.7 males age 18 and over.

99.8% of residents lived in urban areas, while 0.2% lived in rural areas.

There were 8,262 households in Shirley, of which 37.1% had children under the age of 18 living in them. Of all households, 55.0% were married-couple households, 15.3% were households with a male householder and no spouse or partner present, and 21.6% were households with a female householder and no spouse or partner present. About 15.2% of all households were made up of individuals and 6.2% had someone living alone who was 65 years of age or older.

There were 8,782 housing units, of which 5.9% were vacant. The homeowner vacancy rate was 2.1% and the rental vacancy rate was 5.5%.

Racial composition as of the 2020 census
Race	Number	Percent
White	17,619	66.8%
Black or African American	2,103	8.0%
American Indian and Alaska Native	164	0.6%
Asian	737	2.8%
Native Hawaiian and Other Pacific Islander	2	0.0%
Some other race	2,546	9.7%
Two or more races	3,189	12.1%
Hispanic or Latino (of any race)	6,200	23.5%

=== 2000 census ===
As of the census of 2000, there were 26,395 people, 7,353 households, and 6,176 families residing in the Census-designated place (CDP). The population density was 2,282.5 inhabitants per square mile (881.3/km^{2}). There were 7,774 housing units at an average density of 698.7 per square mile (269.8/km^{2}). The racial makeup of the CDP was 89.69% White, 3.33% African American, 0.32% Native American, 1.23% Asian, 0.03% Pacific Islander, 2.84% from other races, and 2.56% from two or more races. Hispanic or Latino of any race were 10.82% of the population.

There were 7,353 households, out of which 47.2% had children under the age of 18 living with them, 64.4% were married couples living together, 13.8% had a female householder with no husband present, and 16.0% were non-families. 11.6% of all households were made up of individuals, and 3.8% had someone living alone who was 65 years of age or older. The average household size was 3.43 and the average family size was 3.67.

In the CDP, the population was spread out, with 31.2% under the age of 18, 9.7% from 18 to 24, 31.9% from 25 to 44, 21.0% from 45 to 64, and 6.3% who were 65 years of age or older. The median age was 32 years. For every 100 females, there were 99.3 males. For every 100 females age 18 and over, there were 96.9 males.

=== 2011 estimate ===
The estimated median household income in 2011 was $82,791. In 2000, the household median income was $57,294.

== Education ==
Most of the population of Shirley is served by the William Floyd School District, including the southern, eastern, and central portions of the hamlet. Much of western Shirley is zoned in the South Country Central School District, but the vast majority of this area is the Wertheim National Wildlife Refuge. Northern Shirley is served by the Longwood Central School District.

== Notable people ==
- Frank Coraci, film director
- Al Plastino, artist for DC Comics' Superman and Batman
- Cletus Seldin (born 1986), boxer
- Lee Zeldin, United States congressman and candidate for Governor of New York
- Courtney Culkin, Playboy Playmate
