= Moriches Bay =

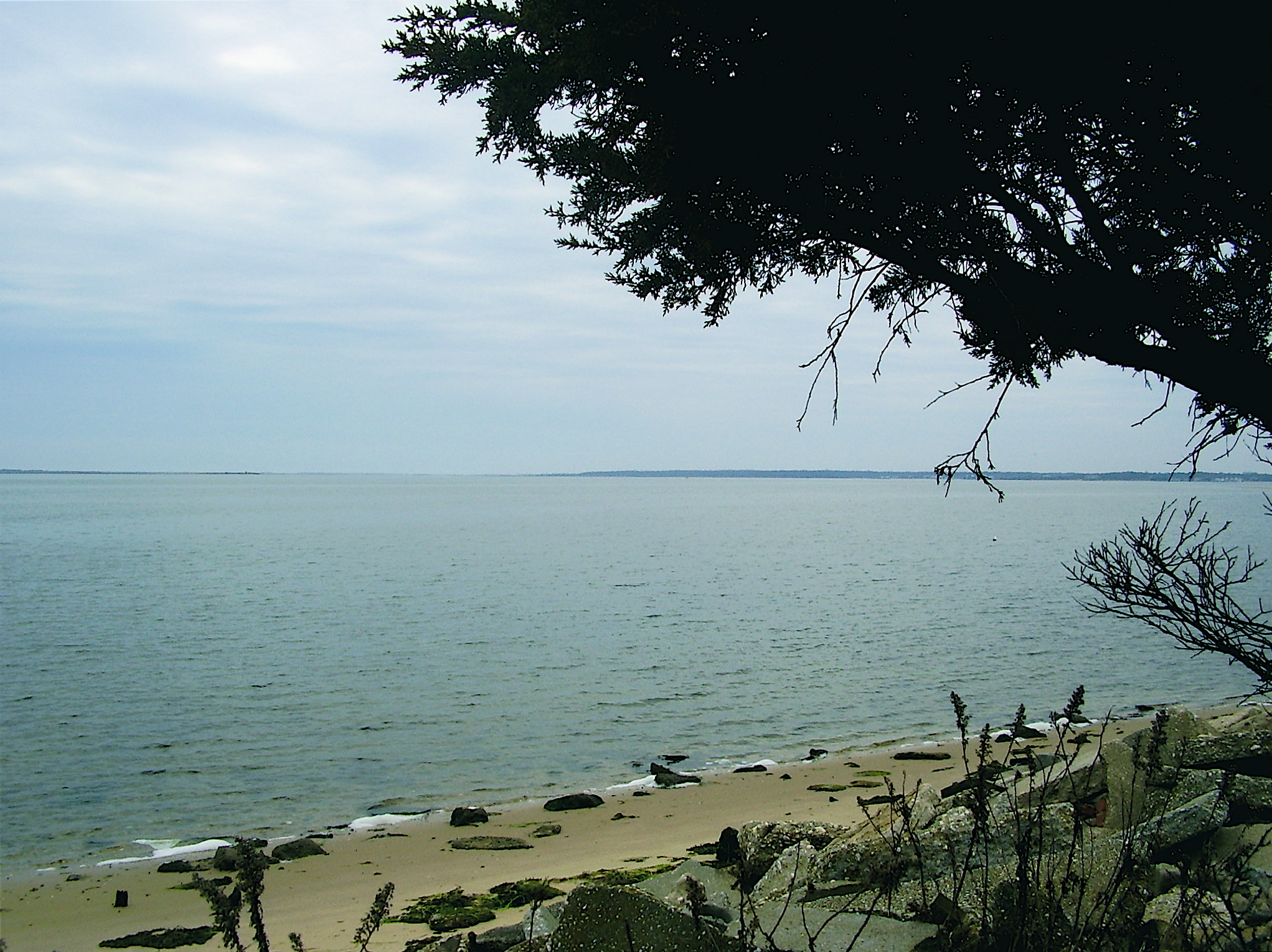

- Location within New York
- Location: Long Island, New York
- Coordinates: 40°47′22″N 72°42′56″W
- Type: Lagoon
- Primary inflows: Moriches and Shinnecock Inlets
- Primary outflows: Atlantic Ocean

Moriches Bay (/moʊˈrɪtʃɪz/ moh-RITCH-iz) is a lagoon system on the south shore of Long Island, New York. The name Moriches comes from Meritces, a Native American who owned land on Moriches Neck.

Two townships in Suffolk, New York (Brookhaven and Southampton) share its shoreline.

Moriches Bay is east of the Mastic Narrows and Great South Bay and west of Shinnecock Bay. The bay is 62 miles (100 km) east of New York City.

Moriches Bay has a body of water of 9,480-acre (3,840 ha) of aquatic environment. This includes Moneybogue Bay and Quantuck Bay, its salt marshes, dredged material islands, and intertidal flats.The bay is between the Outer barrier islands and Long Island mainland. Its flow comes from the Moriches and Shinnecock Inlets)

The western boundary of Moriches Bay is the Smith Point Bridge; the eastern boundary is the eastern edge of Quantuck Bay. This bayside habitat includes the tidal creeks and marshes feeding into Moriches Bay from the Long Island mainland.

A thriving habitat off the Atlantic Ocean, Moriches Bay is used by Long Islanders for local fishing. Moriches Bay is a natural habitat for shellfish, migrating and wintering waterfowl, colonial nesting waterbirds, beach-nesting birds, migratory shorebirds, raptors, and rare plants.

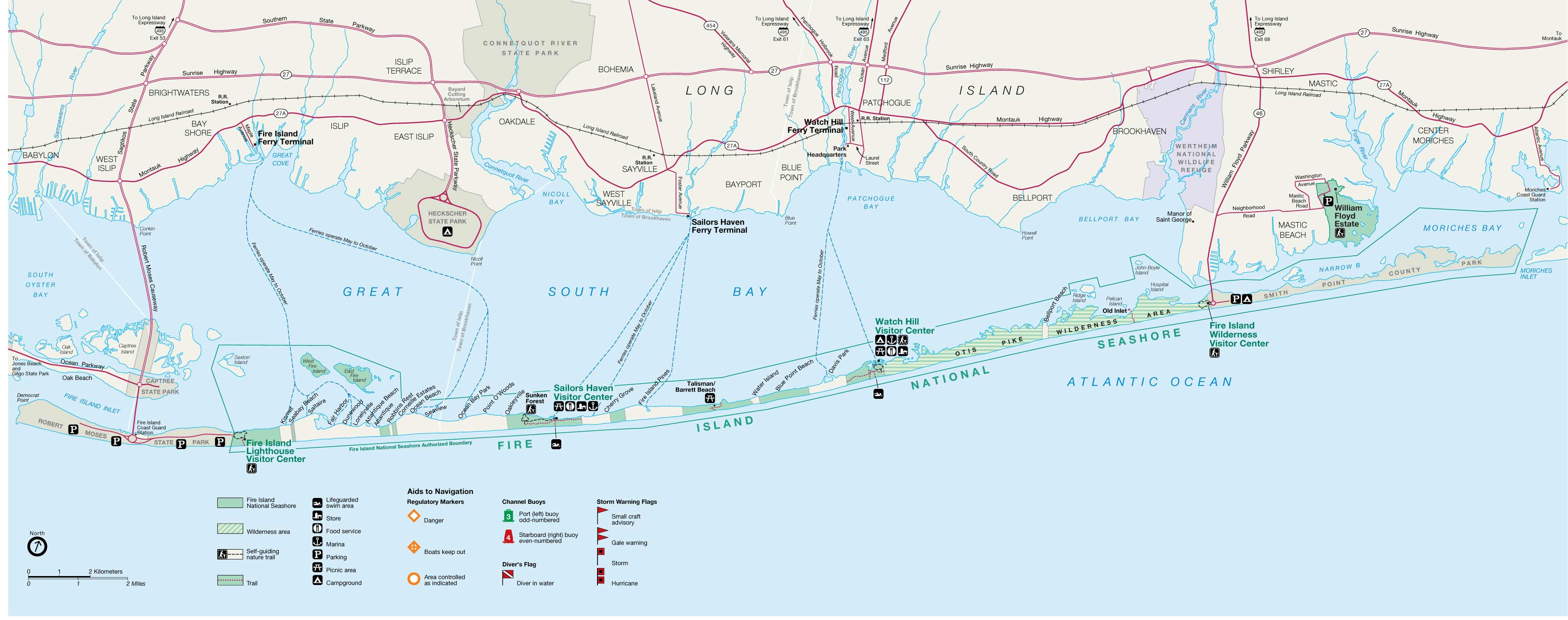
Map of Great South Bay. Moriches Bay is on the far right

The Great South Bay and Moriches Bay seabeds up to the barrier beach are owned by the towns through a grant by the British monarch long before the existence of the United States. It has been repeatedly adjudicated (even to the U.S. Supreme Court) that the land grants in the Dongan (Governor of New York) patents (Islip, Brookhaven, Southampton and East Hampton Towns, 1686) are valid. However, since 1968 the federal government has been attempting to take title of and lay claim to, by adverse possession, the bay bottoms of Islip and Brookhaven towns extending outward from the barrier beach.

== See also ==
- Moriches Inlet
- Outer Barrier
- Patchogue Bay
- South Shore Estuary
- Suffolk County, New York
