= List of New York placenames of Native American origin =

The following list includes settlements, geographic features, and political subdivisions of New York whose names are derived from Native American languages.

== Listings ==
=== Counties ===
- Allegany County
  - Town of Allegany
  - Village of Allegany
  - Allegany State Park
- Cattaraugus County
  - Village of Cattaraugus
  - Cattaraugus Creek
- Cayuga County
  - Cayuga Lake
  - Cayuga Lake (AVA)
- Chautauqua County
  - Town of Chautauqua
  - Hamlet of Chautauqua
  - Chautauqua Lake
- Chemung County
  - Town of Chemung
  - Chemung River
- Chenango County
  - Town of Chenango
  - Hamlet of Chenango Forks
  - Chenango River
- Erie County
  - Lake Erie
- Genesee County
  - Town of Genesee
  - Town of Genesee Falls
  - Genesee River
  - Genesee Valley Park
- Niagara County
  - City of Niagara Falls
  - Niagara Falls
  - Niagara Falls State Park
  - Town of Niagara
  - Fort Niagara
  - Niagara Frontier
  - Niagara River
  - Niagara Gorge
  - Niagara Escarpment
  - Niagara Escarpment (AVA)
- Oneida County – named after the Oneida people.
  - City of Oneida
  - Village of Oneida Castle
  - Village of Oneida Corners
  - Oneida Creek
  - Oneida Lake
  - Oneida River
- Onondaga County
  - City of Onondaga
  - Hamlet of Onondaga Hill
  - Onondaga Creek
  - Onondaga Lake
  - Onondaga Lake Park
  - Onondaga Park
- Ontario County
  - Town of Canandaigua
  - City of Canandaigua
  - Hamlet of Ontario
  - Lake Ontario
- Oswego County
  - City of Oswego
  - Town of Oswego
  - Oswego River
- Otsego County
  - Town of Otsego
  - Otsego Lake
- Saratoga County
  - Town of Saratoga
  - City of Saratoga Springs
- Schenectady County
  - City of Schenectady
- Schoharie County
  - Town of Schoharie
  - Village of Schoharie
  - Schoharie Creek
  - Schoharie Valley
- Seneca County
  - Town of Seneca
  - Seneca Lake
  - Seneca River
- Tioga County
  - Town of Tioga
  - Tioga River
- Wyoming County
  - Village of Wyoming

=== Settlements ===
- Apalachin
- Asharoken
- Canajoharie
- Canandaigua
- Canarsie, Brooklyn
- Cassadaga
- Chappaqua
- Cheektowaga
- Commack
- Conesus
- Copake
- Copiague
- Coxsackie
- Cutchogue
- Esopus
- Hannawa Falls
- Hauppauge
- Irondequoit
- Jamaica
- Kerhonkson
- Kiamesha Lake
- Lackawanna
- Mahopac
- Mamaroneck
- Manhasset
- Manhattan - probably from <man-ǎ-hǎ-tonh>, which seems to reflect Munsee Delaware [ˈeːnta mənaˈhahteːnk], "where one gathers bows" (with -/aht/-, "bow").
- Massapequa
- Mattituck
- Merrick
- Montauk
- Napanoch
- Nanuet
- Napeague
- Niskayuna
- Noyack
- Nyack
- Ossining
- Otisco
- Owego
- Patchogue
- Peconic
- Poughkeepsie
- Quiogue
- Quogue
- Ronkonkoma
- Sagaponack
- Schodack
- Setauket
- Shandaken
- Shekomeko
- Skaneateles
- Ticonderoga
- Tuckahoe, Suffolk County
- Tuckahoe, Westchester County
- Waccabuc
- Wappinger
- Wassaic
- Wawarsing
- Wawayanda
- Wyandanch
- Wykagyl
- Yaphank

=== Bodies of water ===
- Ashokan Reservoir
- Canandaigua Lake
- Claverack Creek
- Conesus Lake
- Cossayuna Lake
- Hoosic River
- Keuka Lake
- Mongaup River
- Neversink River
- Nissequogue River
- Oatka Creek
- Otisco Lake
- Owasco Lake
- Patchogue River
- Pepacton Reservoir
- Potic Creek
- Queechy Lake
- Ronkonkoma Lake
- Sacandaga River
- Saranac River
- Susquehanna River
- Taghkanic Creek
- Taughannock Falls State Park
- Tioughnioga River
- Tonawanda Creek
- Walloomsac River
- Willowemoc Creek

=== Other ===
- Adirondack Mountains
- Mohonk Mountain
- Poospatuck Reservation
- Shawangunk Ridge

== See also ==
- List of place names of Native American origin in the United States
