= Sandspit Park Beach & Marina =

Park in Patchogue, New York, U.S.

Coordinates: 40°44′53″N 73°0′52″W

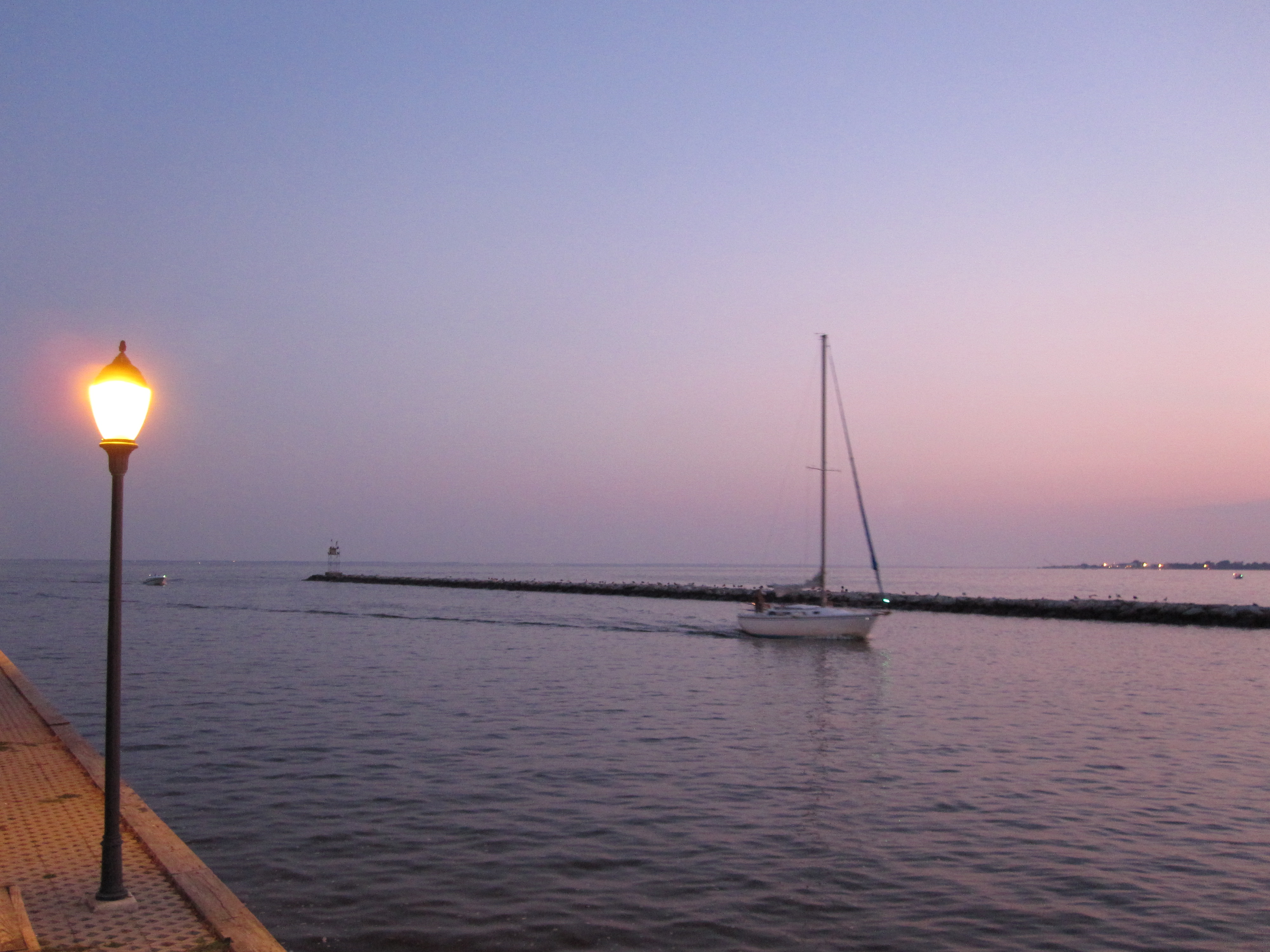
Sandspit Pier, Patchogue River Long Island NY

Sandspit Park Beach & Marina is located on the Patchogue River in the Village of Patchogue in Suffolk County, New York.

Sandspit is on Brightwood Street off Ceder Ave directly south of the Patchogue Long Island Rail Road Station. It is home to the Patchogue and Davis Park Ferry terminal to the Atlantic Ocean Beach and bayfront communities of Davis Park, Leja Beach/Ocean Ridge.

The Park & Marina offer Long Island Bay and riverside views, with shaded park benches and restrooms. There is a large parking lot which is free for Brookhaven residents and non-residents must pay a parking fee.

In the summer season this park facility may reach full parking capacity; however, many recreationalists and visitors alike can find ample parking on the village side streets.

This Long Island Village park and marina has a small Bay beach area, and there is a private river-front restaurant at the corner of the Patchogue River and Brightwood Street called On the Waterfront.

There is a fenced-in playground, a fishing pier on the southeast section of the park, a fairly large village Marina. All areas of the park offer scenic bayfront views, which are particularly enjoyed by local old-timers and some teens.

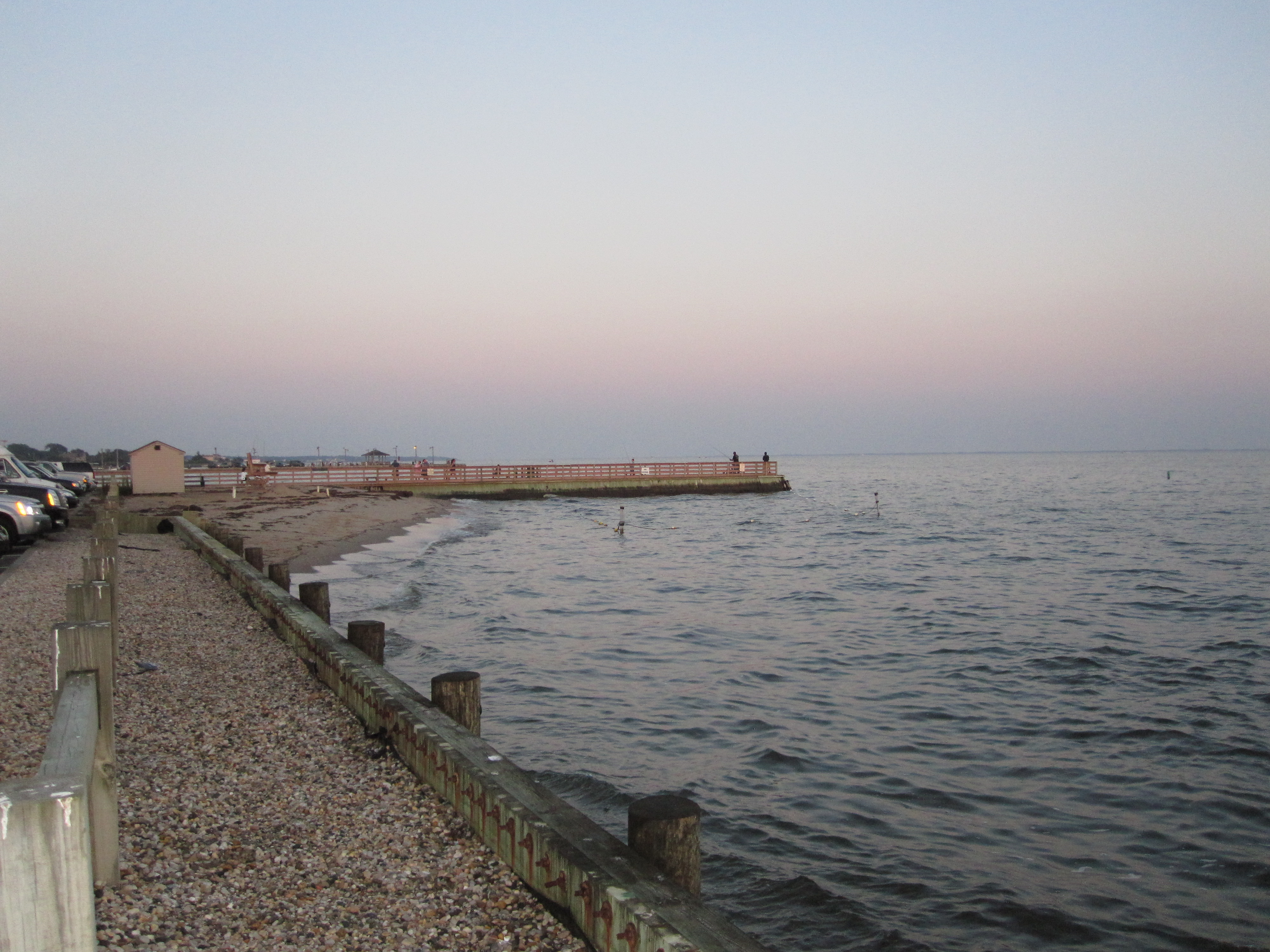
Sandspit Beach & Fishing Pier

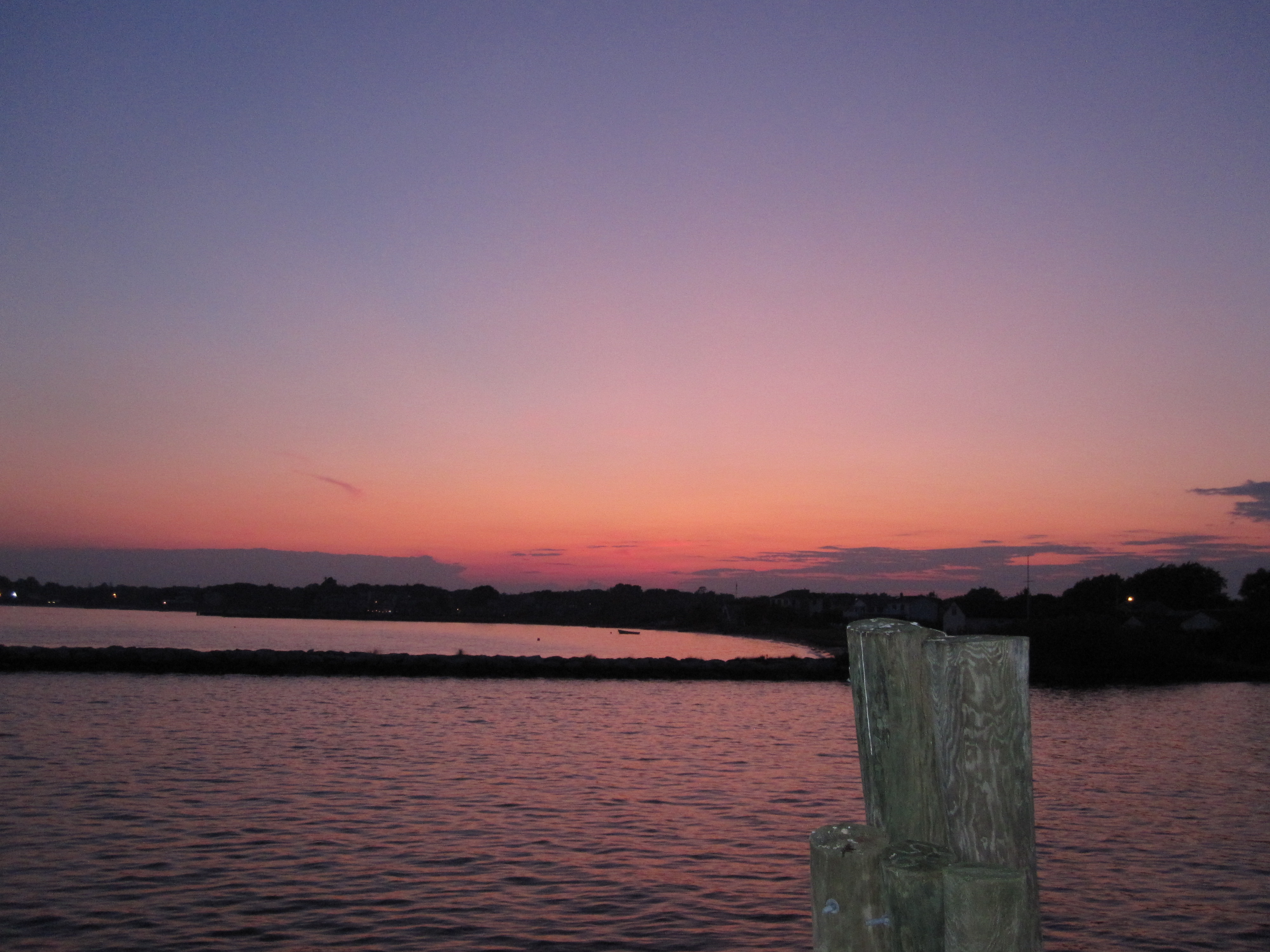
Sandspit Sunset September 5, 2009

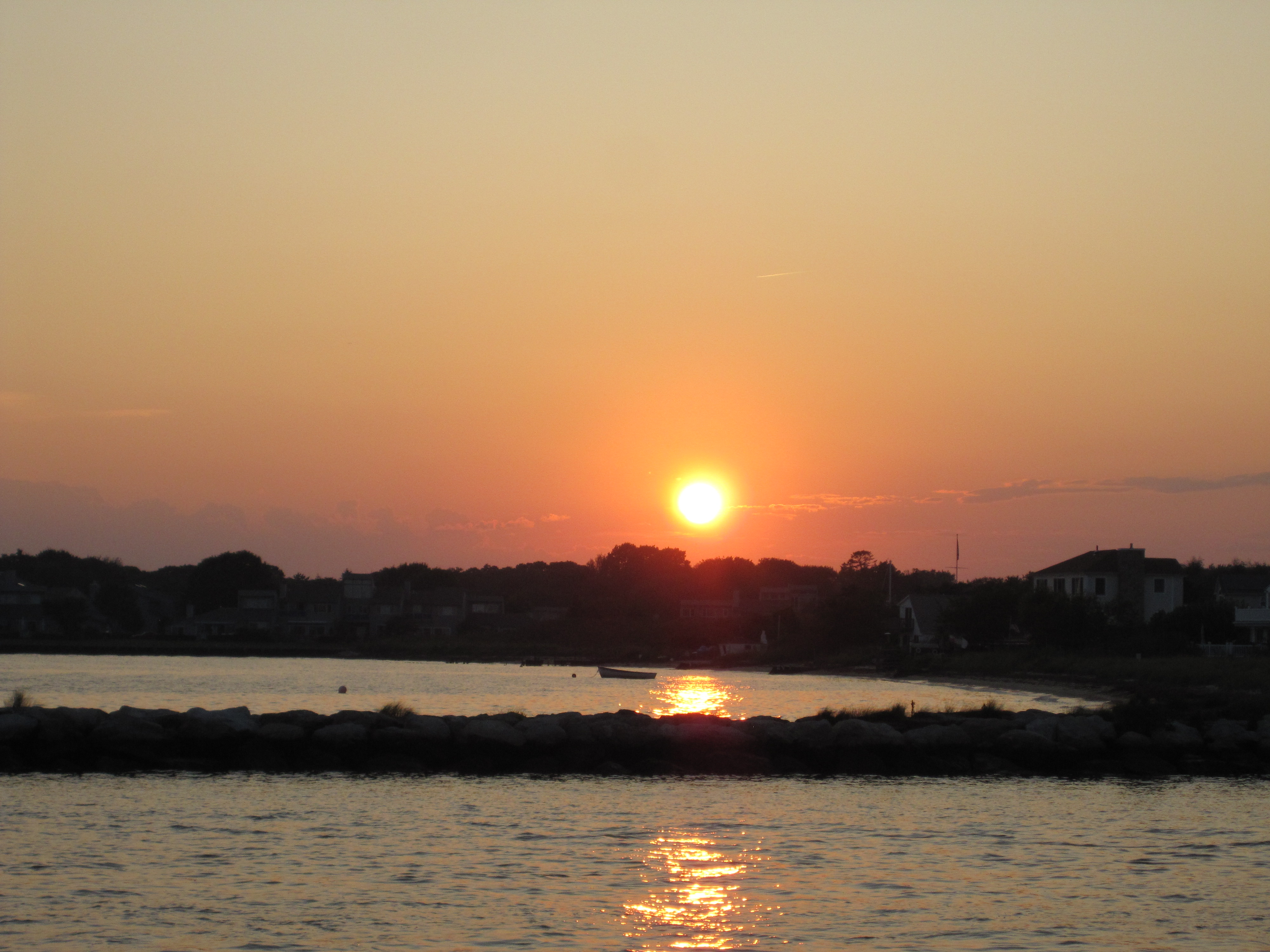
Patchogue Bay & river west cove sunset 2009

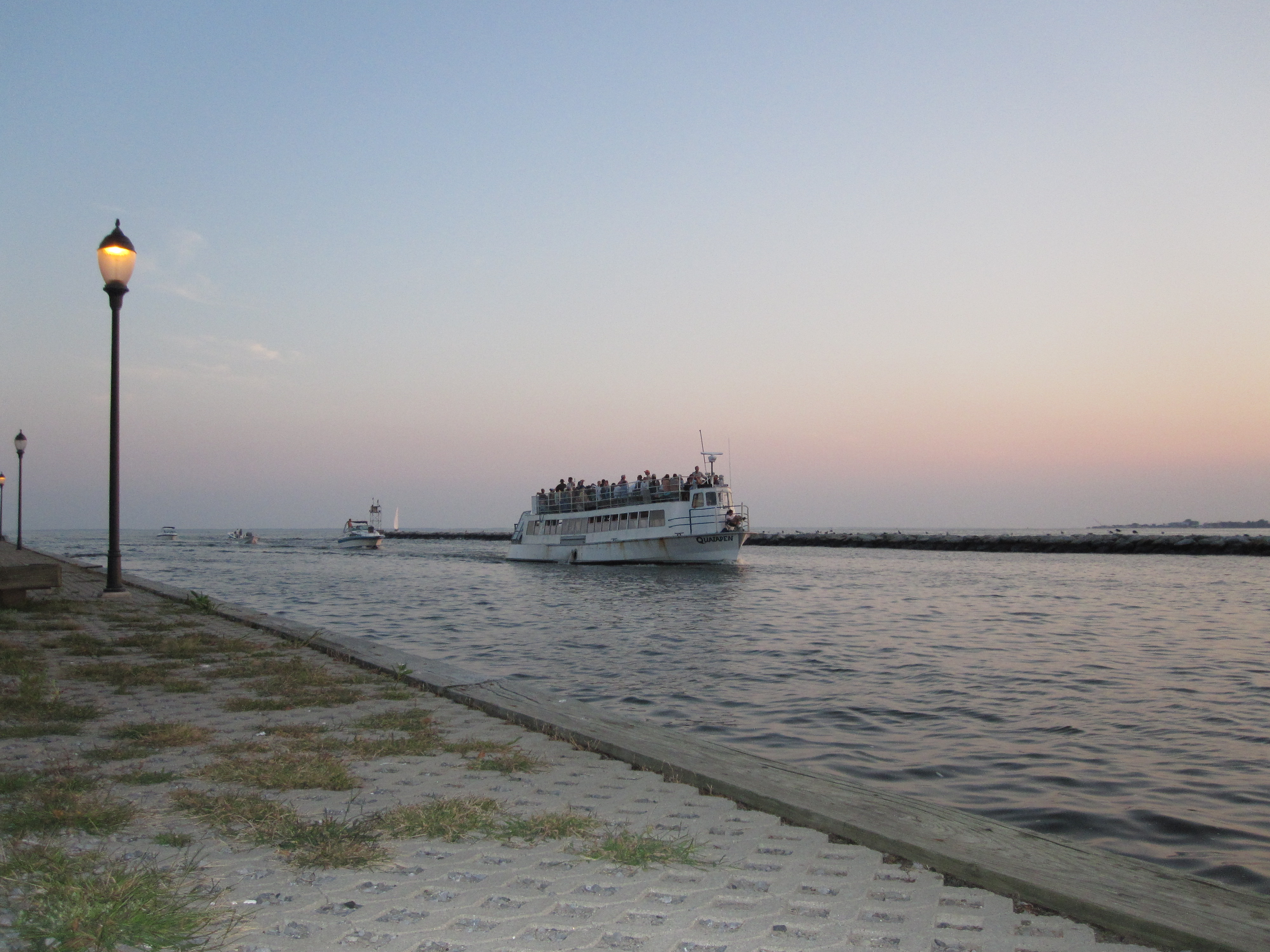
Late Summer Ferry Patchogue NY 2009
- Beach
- Bathrooms
- Playground
- Picnic Area
- Marina
- Davis Park Ferry Terminal
- Parking

== See also ==
- Patchogue
- Patchogue Bay
- Davis Park
- Watch Hill
- Great South Bay
- F I N S
- Shorefront Park

== Map ==
- See Map
