= Ronk =

Ronk or Van Ronk is a surname. Notable people with the surname include:

- Dave Van Ronk (1936–2002), American folk singer
- Martha Ronk (born 1940), American poet
- Sally Ronk (1912–1986), American economist

== See also ==
- Rank (surname)
- Ronkonkoma (disambiguation)
- National Advisory Board on Romani Affairs (RONK)
