= Mascot Dock =

Marina in New York, United States

Coordinates: 40°44′50″N 73°0′34″W

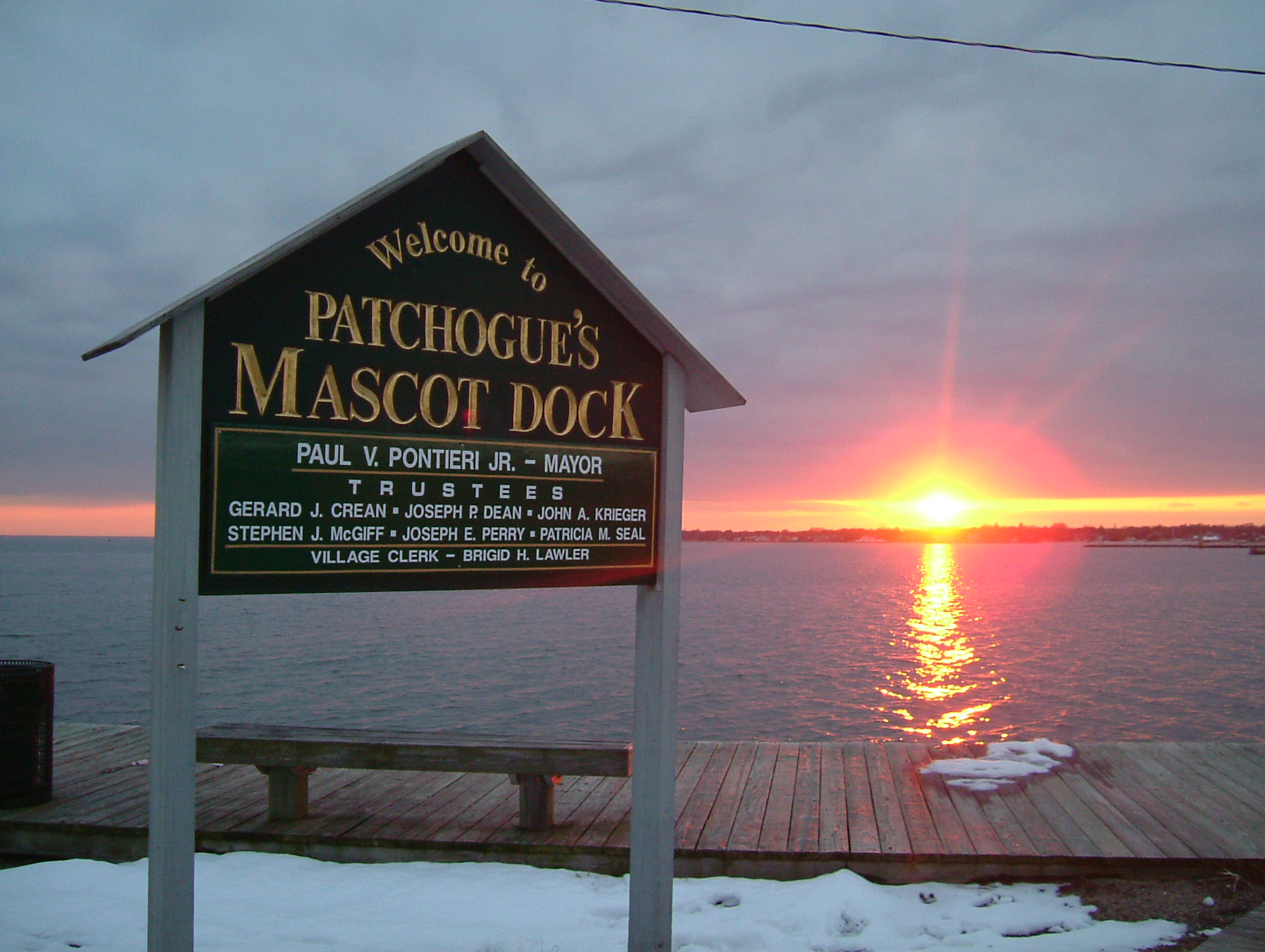
Mascot Dock - Patchogue

Mascot Dock & Marina are a village marina and dock stretching out into the waters of the Patchogue Bay at the end of South Ocean Avenue, in Patchogue, Suffolk County, NY.

The Patchogue Village marina serves many local village functions, in conjunction with Shorefront Park which is adjacent to the Mascot Dock. There have been numerous events that have used the dock's location, such as fireworks displays and boat races, as well as crabbing and fishing off the long L-shaped dock. They serve the south shore of the central Long Island area with waterfront seating overlooking Great South Bay.

== Gallery ==
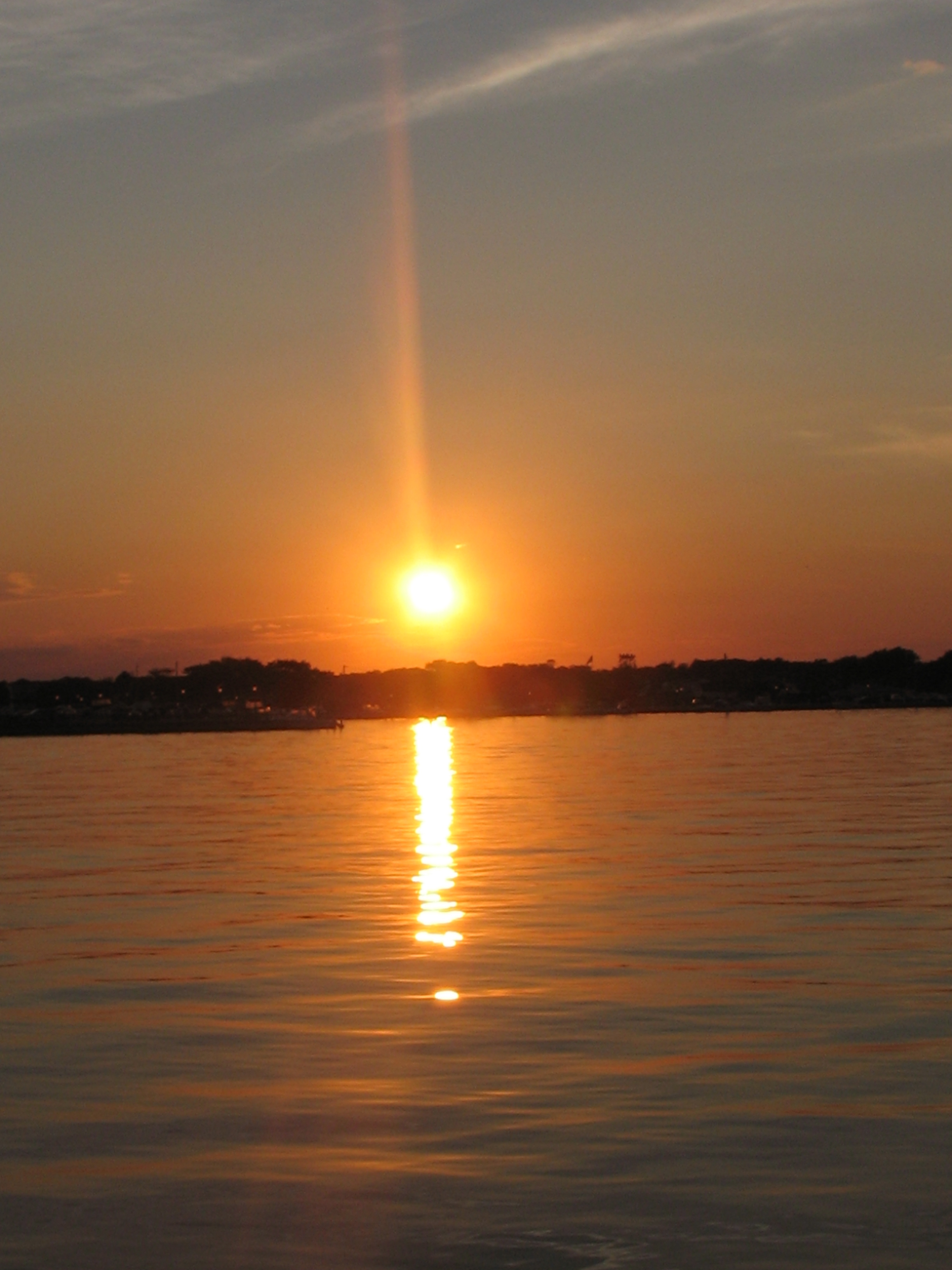
Patchogue, NY

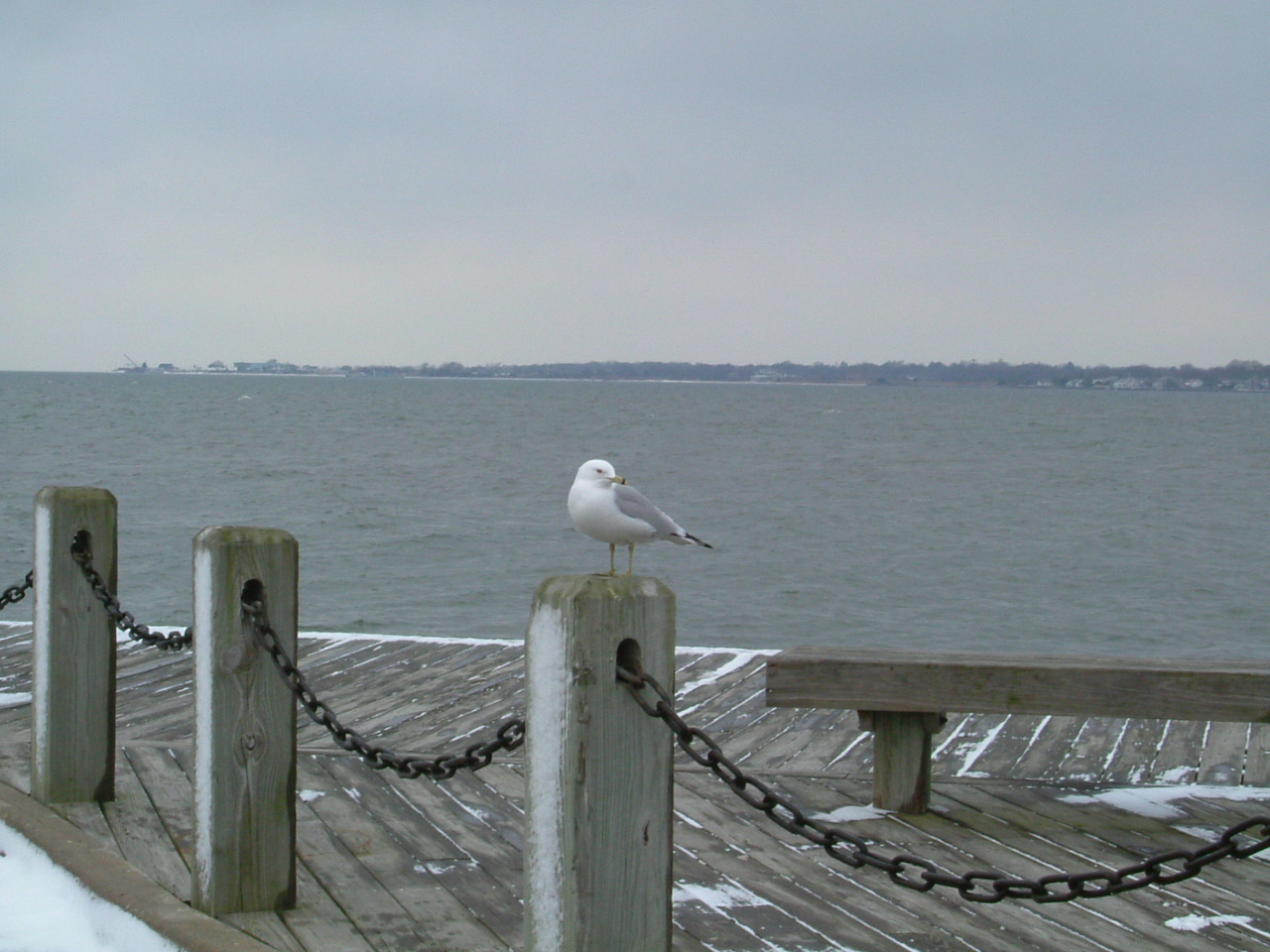
A seagull on the dock in winter
