= South Oyster Bay =

Lagoon and harbor on Long Island, New York, USA

Coordinates: 40°38′00″N 73°27′32″W

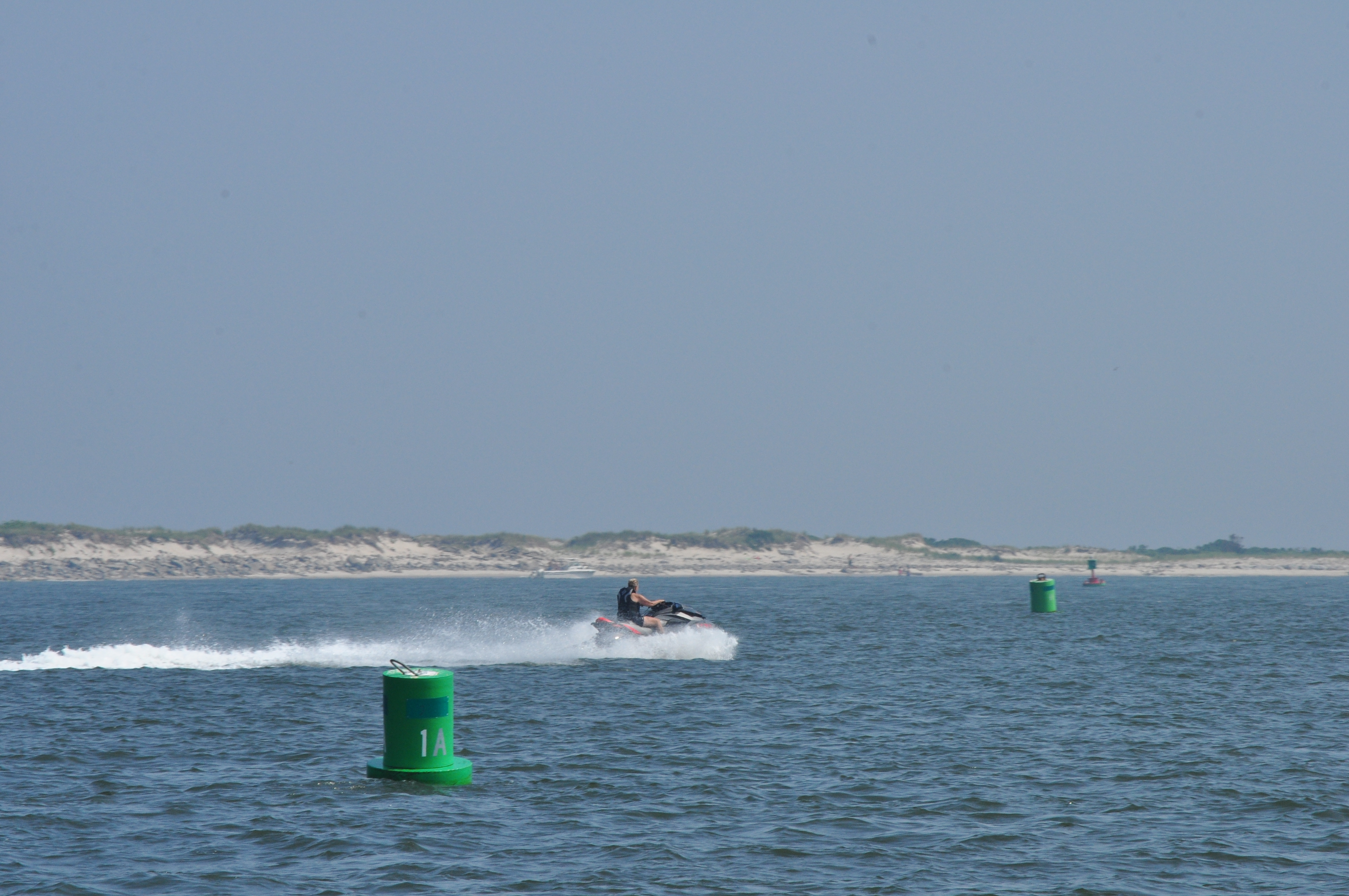
Jetskiing on South Oyster Bay, 2013

South Oyster Bay or East Bay is a lagoon and natural harbor along the western portion of the South Shore of Long Island, in New York, United States.

== Description ==
The harbor is formed by Jones Beach Island, a barrier island on the southern side of Long Island. It is approximately three miles (5 km) wide between the two islands, and approximately 15 mi (24 km) long. It links to Great South Bay on its eastern end and opens to the Atlantic Ocean through inlets on either side of Jones Beach Island.

The name refers to its history as one of the finest oyster beds in the world.

== See also ==
- Outer Barrier
- Jamaica Bay
- Oyster Bay, New York
- Great South Bay
- Patchogue Bay
- South Shore Estuary
