= Patchogue Lake =

Lake in New York, United States

Great Patchogue Lake
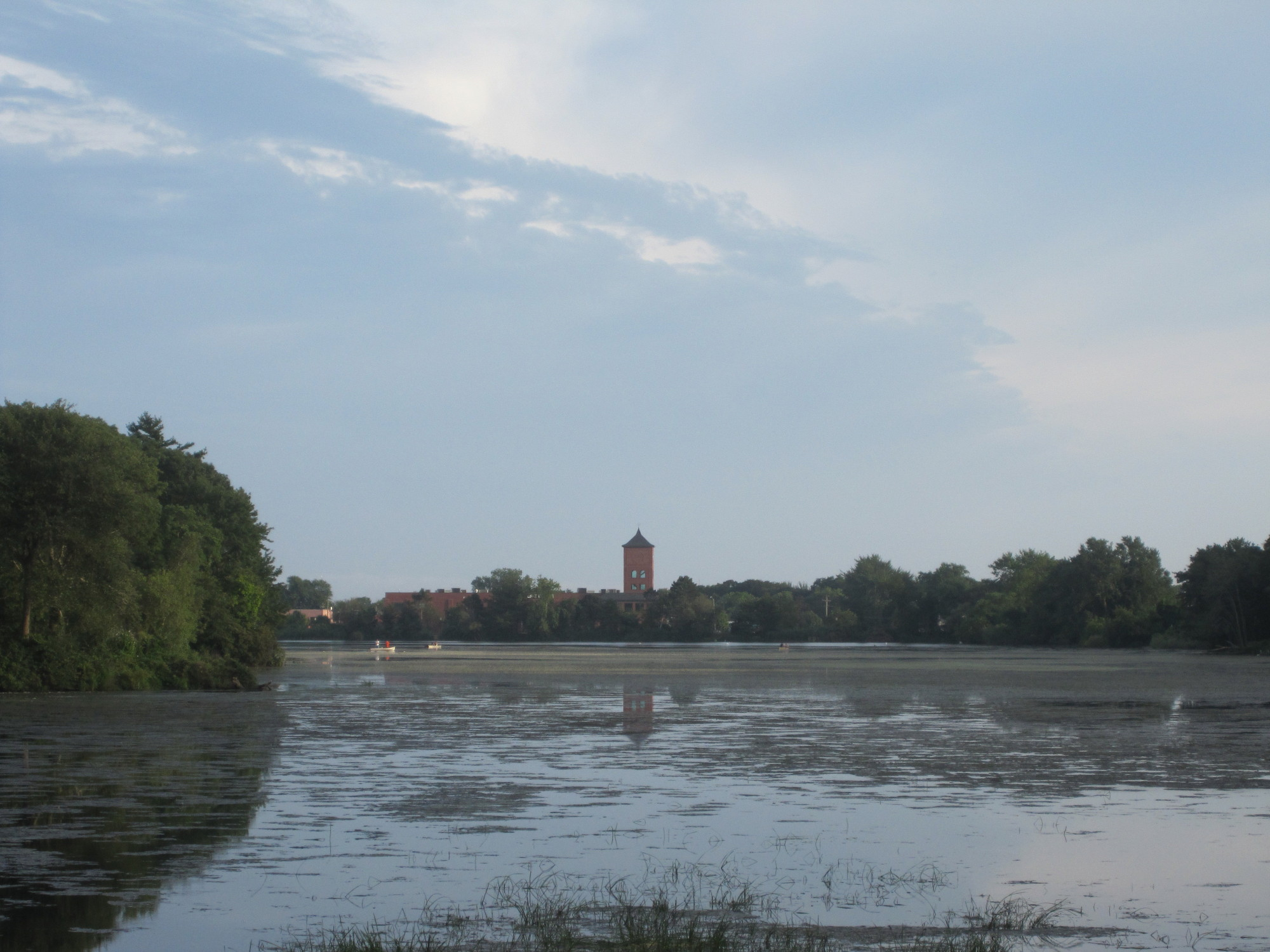

- Location within New York Location within the United States
- Location: Brookhaven, Suffolk County, New York
- Coordinates: 40°46′00″N 073°01′15″W
- Primary inflows: Ground water
- Primary outflows: Patchogue River
- Basin countries: United States
- Surface area: 40 acres (16 ha)
- Max. depth: 8 ft (2.4 m)
- Surface elevation: 10 ft (3.0 m)

Great Patchogue Lake is located just north of Montauk Highway and is bordered by Waverly Avenue to the west and North Ocean Avenue to the east.

Patchogue Lake was dammed to provide water power for the textile industry hence its other name: Lace Mill Pond.

Today it is home to a diverse warm water fish community. Abundant perch and crappie provide plentiful fishing opportunities in the spring.

Species present (naturally reproducing):

- Largemouth bass
- Chain pickerel
- Pumpkinseed
- Black crappie
- Yellow perch
- Brown bullhead

Informal access to the lake is available from East Second Street on the west shore.

Hand launched boats are allowed; shoreline access is available but very limited.

== Patchogue Lake bridge ==
Patchogue Lake Bridge is a concrete arch bridge over Patchogue Lake on Roe Boulevard in Patchogue.

Overview: Concrete arch bridge over Patchogue Lake on Roe Boulevard in North Patchogue Location - Suffolk County, New York Status - Open to traffic

History Built 1920 Design Arch Dimensions Length of largest span: 24.9 ft (7.6 m). Total length: 29.9 ft (9.1 m). Deck width: 39.0 ft (11.9 m). Recognition Eligible for the National Register of Historic Places
