= Shorefront Park =

Concert venue in Patchogue, New York

Coordinates: 40°44′56″N 73°0′26″W

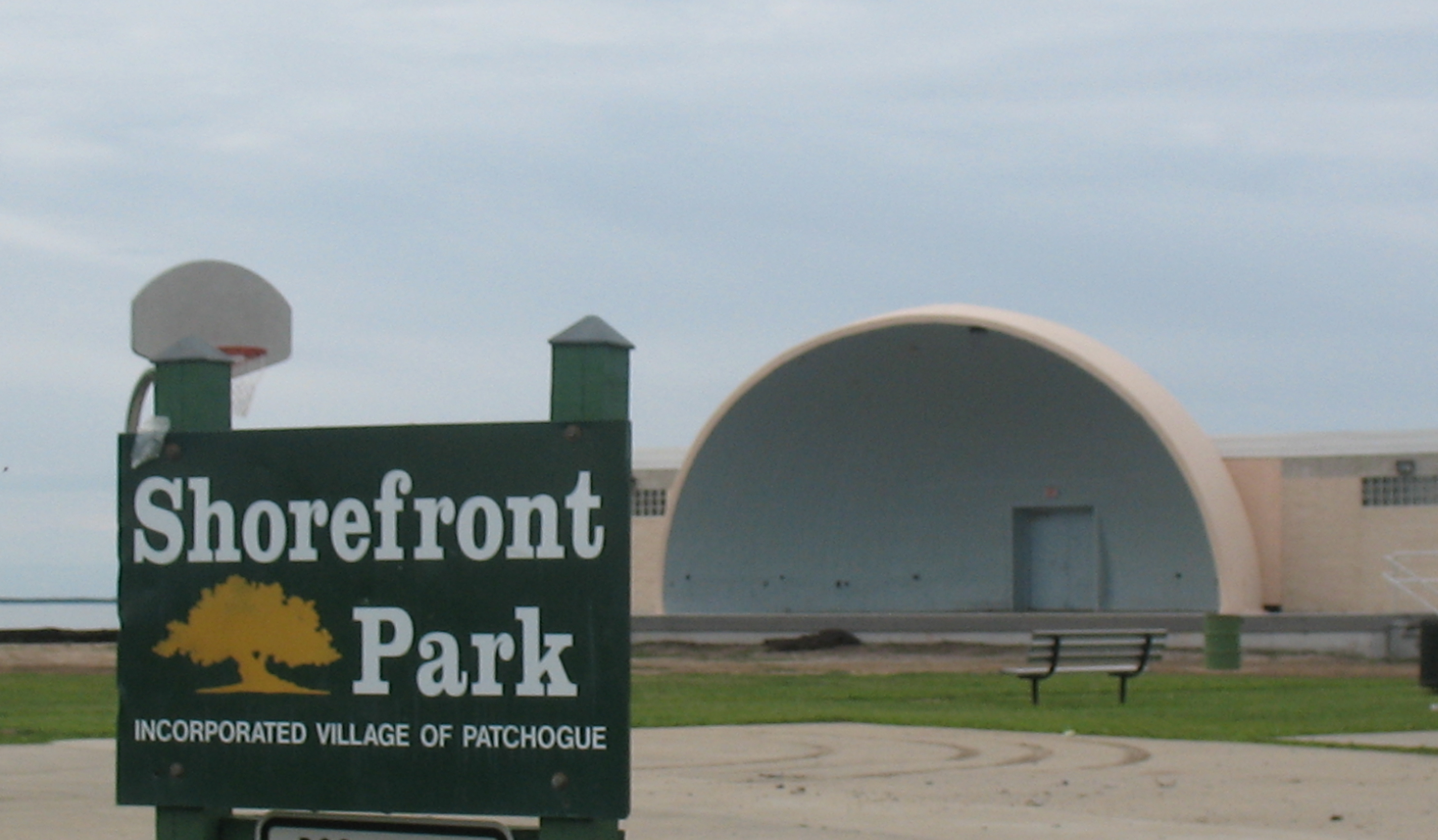
The Village Band Shell

Shorefront Park and the Patchogue Village Band Shell are located on Smith Street at the south end of Rider Avenue, Patchogue, New York.

Since 2007, the Park has undergone updates by the village of Patchogue. There has been replacement of the older Band shell to a more contemporary style has been replaces. The new venue served as the geographical host for the Great South Bay music festival in 2010.

'Rider Avenue Park' is located directly opposite or north of Shorefront Park. This park has 3 baseball diamonds, basketball courts, hiking trails, bleacher stands, and serves local sports activities.

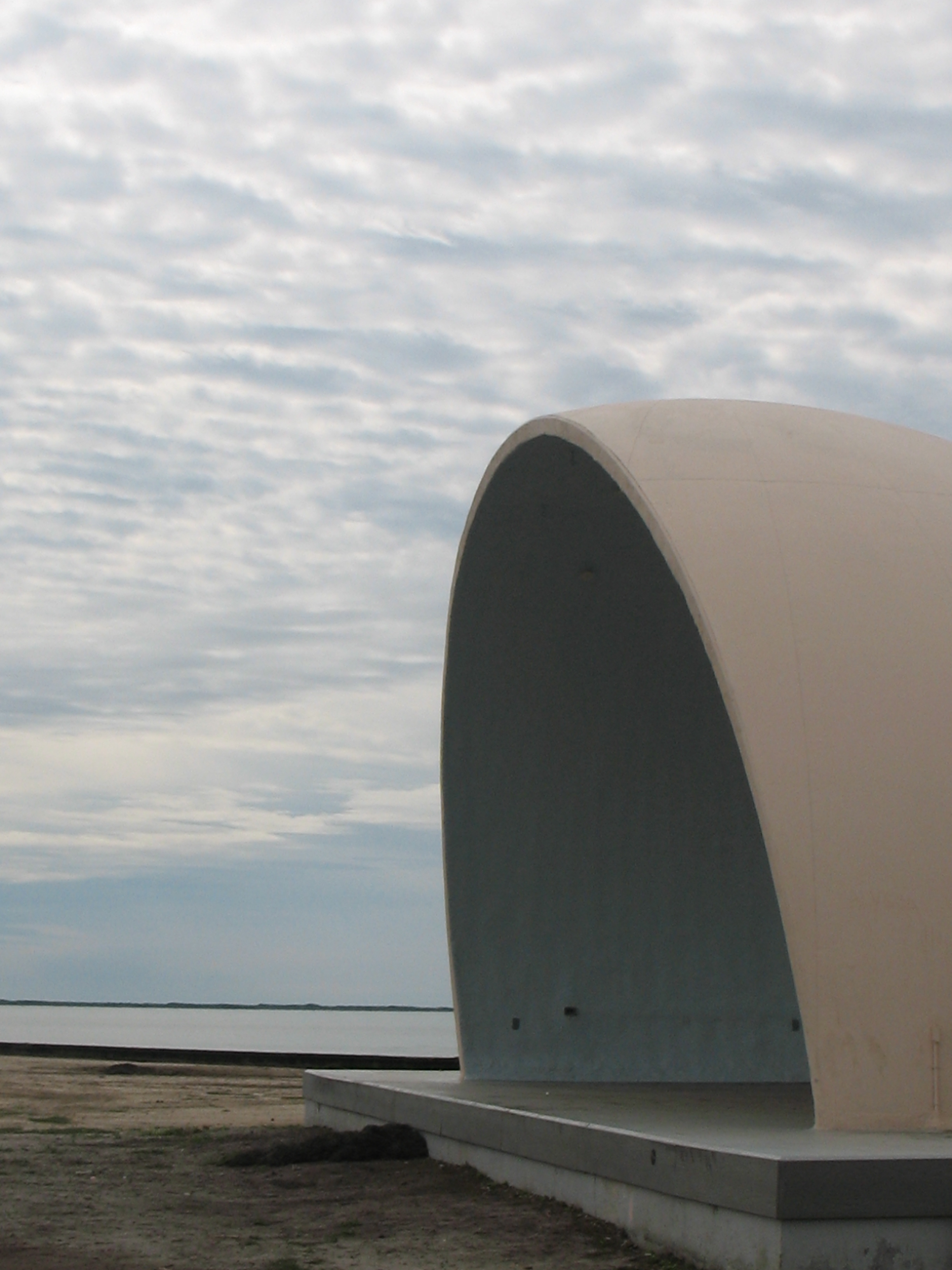
Bay view at the Band Shell

The park is surrounded by tall beach grass with a natural lake.

== Climate at nearby Islip, New York ==
Monthly Normal High and Low Temperatures
City	Jan	Feb	Mar	Apr	May	Jun	Jul	Aug	Sep	Oct	Nov	Dec
Islip	39/23	40/24	48/31	58/40	69/49	77/60	83/66	82/64	75/57	64/45	54/36	44/28
Temperatures listed using the Fahrenheit scale

== See also ==
- Patchogue Bay
- Great South Bay
- Mascot Dock
