= South Shore Estuary =

Estuary in Nassau and Suffolk counties, New York, United States

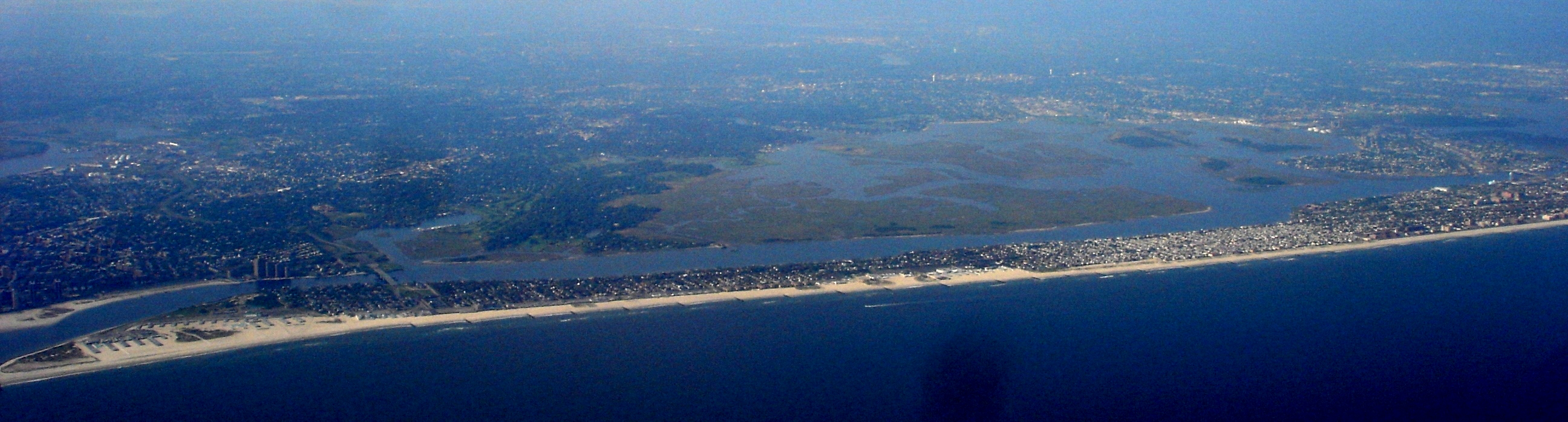
- Aerial view of the Long Beach Barrier Island and South Shore Estuary behind it. May 2007.

- Location within New York
- Location: Nassau County/Suffolk County, New York
- Coordinates: 40°40′40″N 73°11′20″W
- Primary inflows: Long Island South Shore Rivers & Bays; Atlantic Ocean
- Primary outflows: Atlantic Ocean
- Basin countries: United States
- Max. length: 75 miles (120 km)
- Max. width: up to 5 miles (8 km)
- Surface area: 326 square miles (840 km^{2})
- Average depth: up to 15 feet (5 m)
- Max. depth: 15 ft (4.6 m)
- Surface elevation: 10 ft (3 m)
- Islands: Outer Barrier Islands
- Settlements: Queens, Nassau, Suffolk- NY

The South Shore Estuary is an estuary located along the south shore of Long Island, between the mainland and the outer barrier islands, in eastern New York state. It stretches for over 70 miles (110 km) from West Bay in Nassau County to the Shinnecock Bay in Suffolk County.

== Geography ==
The South Shore Estuary includes a series of interconnected bays, rivers, streams, wetlands and small islands located along Long Island's south shore between the mainland and the barrier islands. Reynolds Channel, West Bay, Middle Bay, East Bay, South Oyster Bay, Great South Bay, Patchogue Bay, Moriches Bay and Shinnecock Bay are part of this natural system, and familiar places to many.

== Ecology ==
Estuaries are transition zones between the world's freshwater and marine ecosystems where fresh water mixes with salt water.

Long Island's South Shore estuary is a dynamic ecosystem, formed during the past 5,000 years by the interaction of a rising sea level with the glacially-deposited material that makes up Long Island. In this estuarine environment, tidal marshes, mud and sand flats, underwater plant beds and broad shallows support microscopic plants and animals which, in turn, support the finfish, shellfish, waterfowl and other wildlife that typify the South Shore estuary.

The entire natural system, including the New York barrier islands and the 173 square miles (450 km^{2}) of shallow bays behind them, is still changing and evolving in response to wave action, tides, coastal storms, and the continuing rise of sea level.
