= Oswego =

Oswego may refer to:

== Places ==
=== United States ===
- Oswego, Illinois, a village in Kendall County
- Oswego, Indiana, an unincorporated place in Kosciusko County
- Oswego, Kansas, a city in Labette County
- Oswego, Mississippi, an unincorporated community
- Oswego, Montana, a village in Valley County
- Oswego River (New Jersey), a tributary of the Wading River
- Oswego, South Carolina, a census-designated place in Sumter County
- Lake Oswego, Oregon, a city in northwest Oregon
- Oswego Lake, a lake in Lake Oswego, Oregon
- In New York:
  - Oswego, New York, a city in Oswego County
    - State University of New York at Oswego, a public university
    - Fort Oswego, which occupied the same site
  - Oswego County, New York
  - Oswego River (New York), a tributary of Lake Ontario
  - Oswego (town), New York, a town in Oswego County

== Other uses ==
- Monarda didyma (Oswego Tea), a flower and an herb, native to North America

== See also ==
- Owego (disambiguation)
