= Owego =

Owego may refer to two locations in Tioga County, New York:

- Owego (village), New York
- Owego (town), New York

== See also ==
- Oswego (disambiguation)
