= Sally Ronk =

American economist

Sally Stewart Ronk (August 28, 1912 – December 28, 1986) was an American economist who headed the office of debt analysis of the United States Department of the Treasury.

== Life ==
Ronk was born on August 28, 1912, in Newtonville, Massachusetts, the daughter of Army officer Gilbert Henry Stewart and his wife Elizabeth Barnard Stewart.

She earned a bachelor's degree at Smith College in 1934, and went to New York University for graduate study in economics, at NYU's Graduate School of Business Administration, earning both a Master of Business Administration and a Ph.D. there.

After working as an economist for the Federal Deposit Insurance Corporation she moved to Bankers Trust in New York City. She worked for Bankers Trust from 1945 to 1970, becoming a vice president in 1968. Next, she worked for Drexel Firestone as chief economist and vice president from 1970 to 1974. She joined the US Treasury Department in 1974, and retired in 1985.

In her retirement, she returned to New York, where she died on December 28, 1986.

== Recognition ==
Ronk was elected as a Fellow of the American Statistical Association in 1976. She was awarded the Smith College Medal in 1979.
