= Quiogue, New York =

Quiogue
- Hamlet and census-designated place
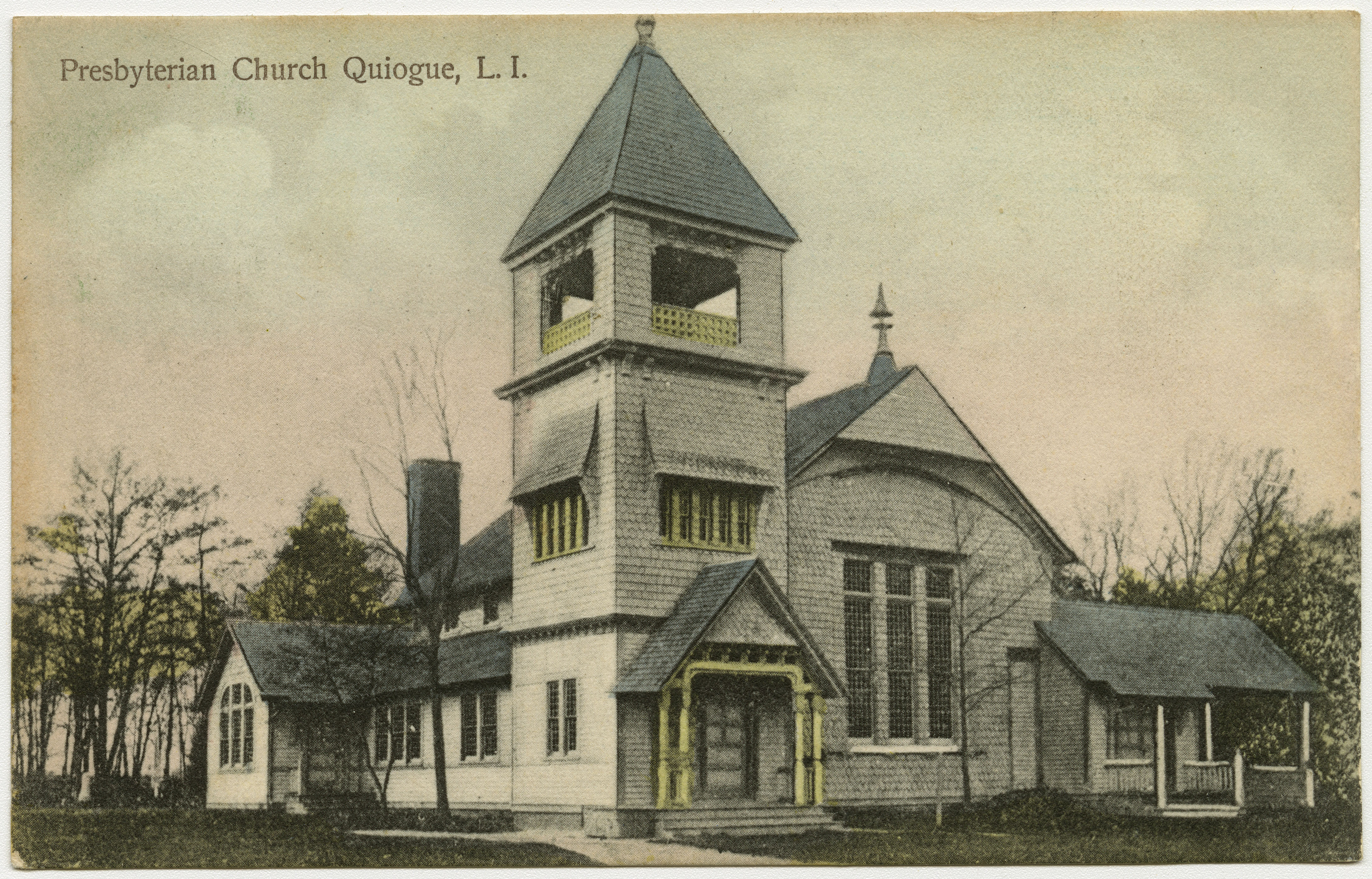
- Postcard of the old Quiogue Presbyterian Church

- Location within New York
- Coordinates: 40°49′11″N 072°37′44″W
- Country: United States
- State: New York
- County: Suffolk
- Town: Town of Southampton

Area (2010 Census)
  - Total: 1.688 sq mi (4.37 km^{2})
  - Land: 1.258 sq mi (3.26 km^{2})
  - Water: 0.430 sq mi (1.11 km^{2}) 25.5%
- Elevation: 23 ft (7 m)

Population (2010)
  - Total: 816
  - Density: 483/sq mi (186/km^{2})
- Time zone: UTC-5 (Eastern (EST))
  - Summer (DST): UTC-4 (EDT)
- ZIP code: 11978
- Area code: 631
- FIPS code: 36-60411
- GNIS feature ID: 962111

Quiogue /ˈkwiːɒɡ/ is a hamlet and census-designated place (CDP) in the Town of Southampton, in Suffolk County, New York, United States. As of the 2020 census, Quiogue had a population of 1,013. The name of the CDP was corrected from "Quioque" to "Quiogue" by the U.S. Census Bureau in 2010.

== Geography ==
Quiogue is located at 40°49′11″N 072°37′44″W (40.8198217, -72.6289837) and its elevation is 23 feet (7 m).

According to the 2010 United States census, the CDP has a total area of 1.688 square miles (4.37 km^{2}), of which 1.258 square miles (3.26 km^{2}) is land and 0.430 square miles (1.11 km^{2}), or 25.5%, is water.

== Demographics ==
As of the census of 2000, there were 800 people, 336 households, and 192 families residing in the CDP. The population density was 635.7 inhabitants per square mile (245.4/km^{2}). There were 545 housing units at an average density of 433.1 per square mile (167.2/km^{2}). The racial makeup of the CDP was 74.50% White (596 people), 11.00% African American (88 people), 1.00% Native American (8 people), 1.88% Asian (15 people), 7.00% from other races (56 people), and 4.62% from two or more races (37 people). Hispanic or Latino of any race were 14.38% (115 people) of the population.

There were 336 households, out of which 28.9% had children under the age of 18 living with them, 42.6% were married couples living together, 11.9% had a female householder with no husband present, and 42.6% were non-families. 36.3% of all households were made up of individuals, and 17.6% had someone living alone who was 65 years of age or older. The average household size was 2.38 and the average family size was 3.02.

In the CDP, the population was spread out, with 22.3% under the age of 18, 8.0% from 18 to 24, 31.0% from 25 to 44, 21.9% from 45 to 64, and 16.9% who were 65 years of age or older. The median age was 39 years. For every 100 females, there were 113.3 males. For every 100 females age 18 and over, there were 108.7 males.

The median income for a household in the CDP was $50,759, and the median income for a family was $62,250. Males had a median income of $38,036 versus $31,696 for females. The per capita income for the CDP was $29,939. About 2.2% of families and 5.5% of the population were below the poverty line, including 5.5% of those under age 18 and 12.6% of those age 65 or over.
