= Patchogue River =

River in Suffolk County, New York, United States

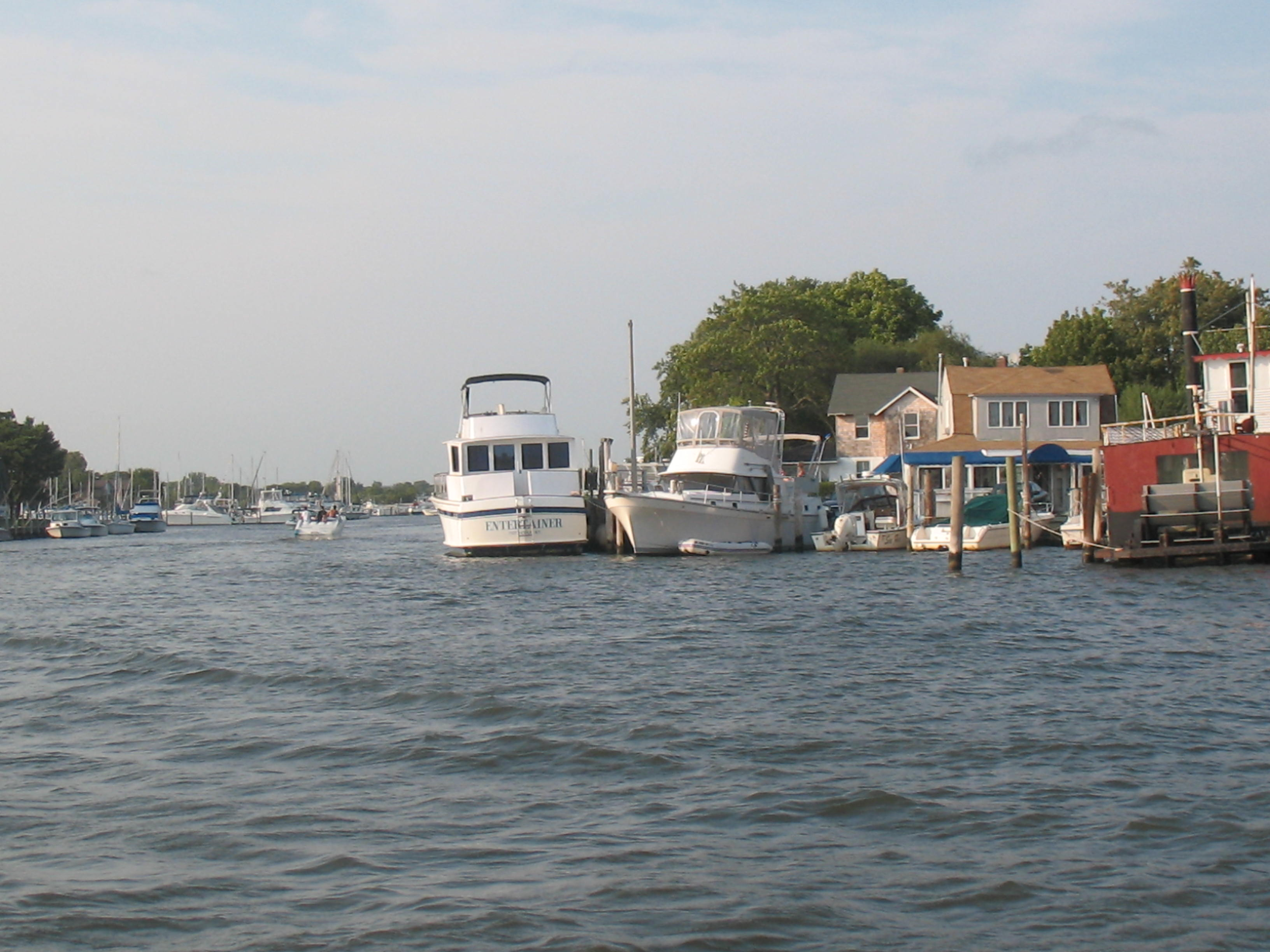

- Location within New York
- Location: Suffolk County, New York
- Coordinates: 40°44′49″N 073°1′0″W
- Primary inflows: Patchogue Bay
- Primary outflows: Great South Bay
- Basin countries: United States
- Max. depth: 12 ft (3.7 m)
- Surface elevation: 10 ft (3.0 m)

The Patchogue River is a mile-long waterway In Patchogue, New York that is lined with a variety of restaurants, marinas, fueling docks, apartment condominiums, and ferry terminals.

== Description ==
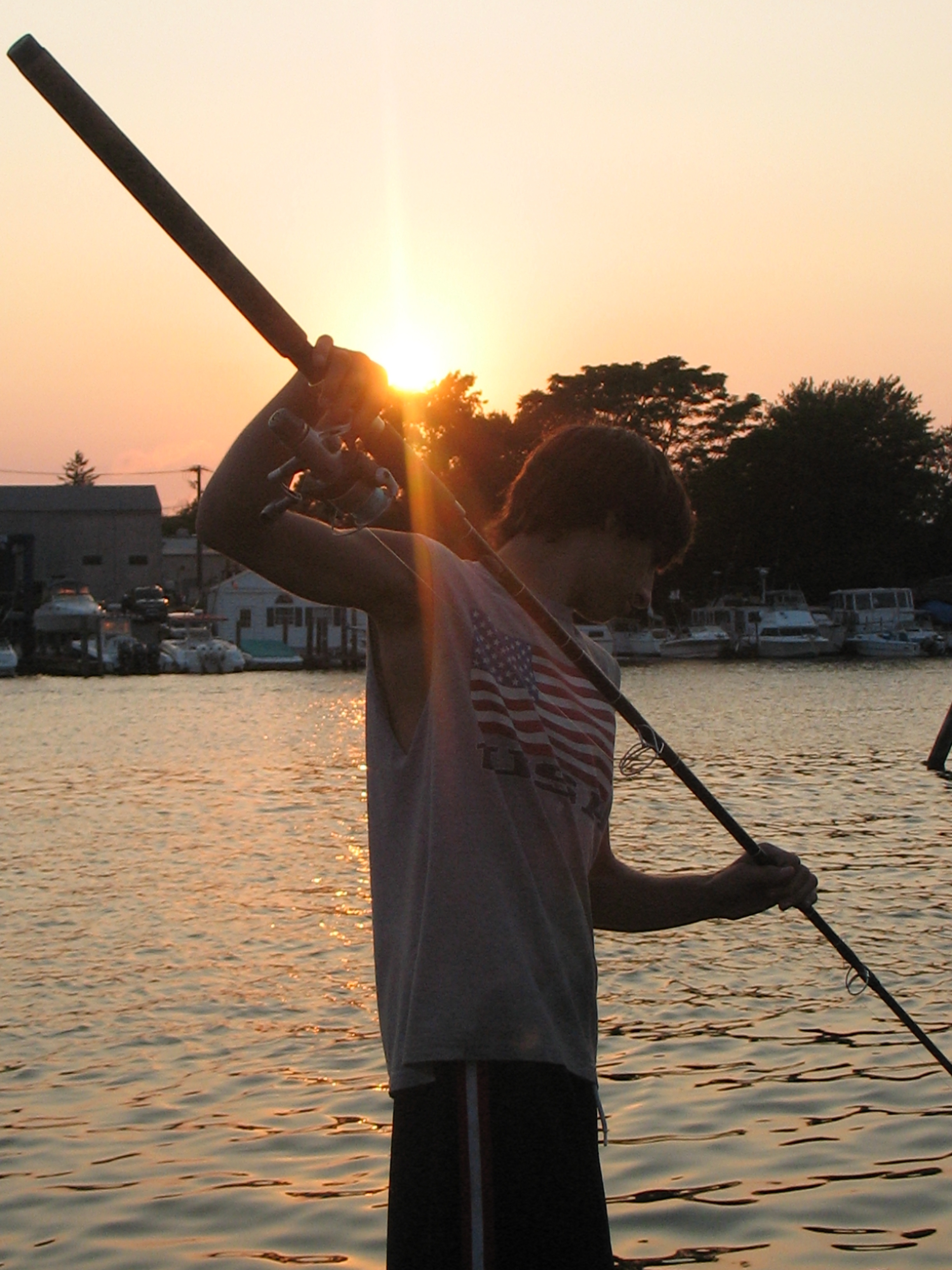
Fishing on the river

The Patchogue River Inlet joins itself into the cove of Patchogue bay which is part of The Great South Bay. The River flows south and is greeted by Sandspit park on the southeast corner of the River.

The Davis Park ferry terminal is adjacent to the Sandspit park, which offers seating and parking on the river front. Parking is free for Town of Brookhaven residents.

Companies and wholesale clam dealers created a viable mixture of uses for the Patchogue river, which was a widely utilized commercial port in the 19th and 20th Centuries.

The Patchogue Riverfront Committee is host of the Sea Fair River Festival, a riverfront celebration intended to welcome Long Islanders to enjoy and appreciate the beautiful Patchogue River and its maritime sea life.

The Patchogue River serves as a central mariner and recreational water front to many Long Island tourists and Residents alike.

The Fire Island Wilderness area, located on the eastern end of Fire Island, is the only federally designated U.S. Wilderness Area in New York State. It is accessed from the Watch Hill Ferry Terminal located on the Patchogue River one block south and west of the Patchogue train station

== Patchogue River Parade ==
Every year on the Sunday before Thanksgiving, the Patchogue River Parade is held, with boaters decorating and illuminating their boats in that year's theme. The spectacle is viewable from Sandspit Park, Watch Hill Ferry Terminal, or anywhere on the river.

In 2008, the Parade removed the word "Christmas" from its name and became a public controversy, losing about 500 spectators. Brookhaven-based fireworks company "Fireworks by Grucci" dropped its sponsorship after the Greater Patchogue Foundation removed "Christmas" from the parade's name because some residents complained the name wasn't inclusive enough. Grucci vice president Philip Butler opposes the secularization of Christmas. His supporters encouraged area residents to stay away from the parade on Patchogue River.

Attendance was low for the Boat Parade in 2008 not because Butler's relatively few, but vocal, supporters' boycott was successful, but as a result of freezing weather that day coupled with the fact that the well-publicized murder of Marcelo Lucero had occurred just two weeks before.

The Patchogue River Maritime Center Plan recently unveiled to the public a plan to utilize more of the river's benefits, ranging from dredging the river to building a Fire Island National Seashore visitors center and a possible marine museum.

== List of crossings of the Patchogue River ==
- Roe Avenue West
- County Route 19 (Suffolk County, New York); Lake Street
- County Route 85 (Suffolk County, New York); West Main Street
- Montauk Branch of the Long Island Rail Road
- County Route 65 (Suffolk County, New York); Division Street.

== See also ==
- Patchogue Lake
