= Patchogue Bay =

Bay on Long Island, New York

Coordinates: 40°44′32″N 73°00′53″W

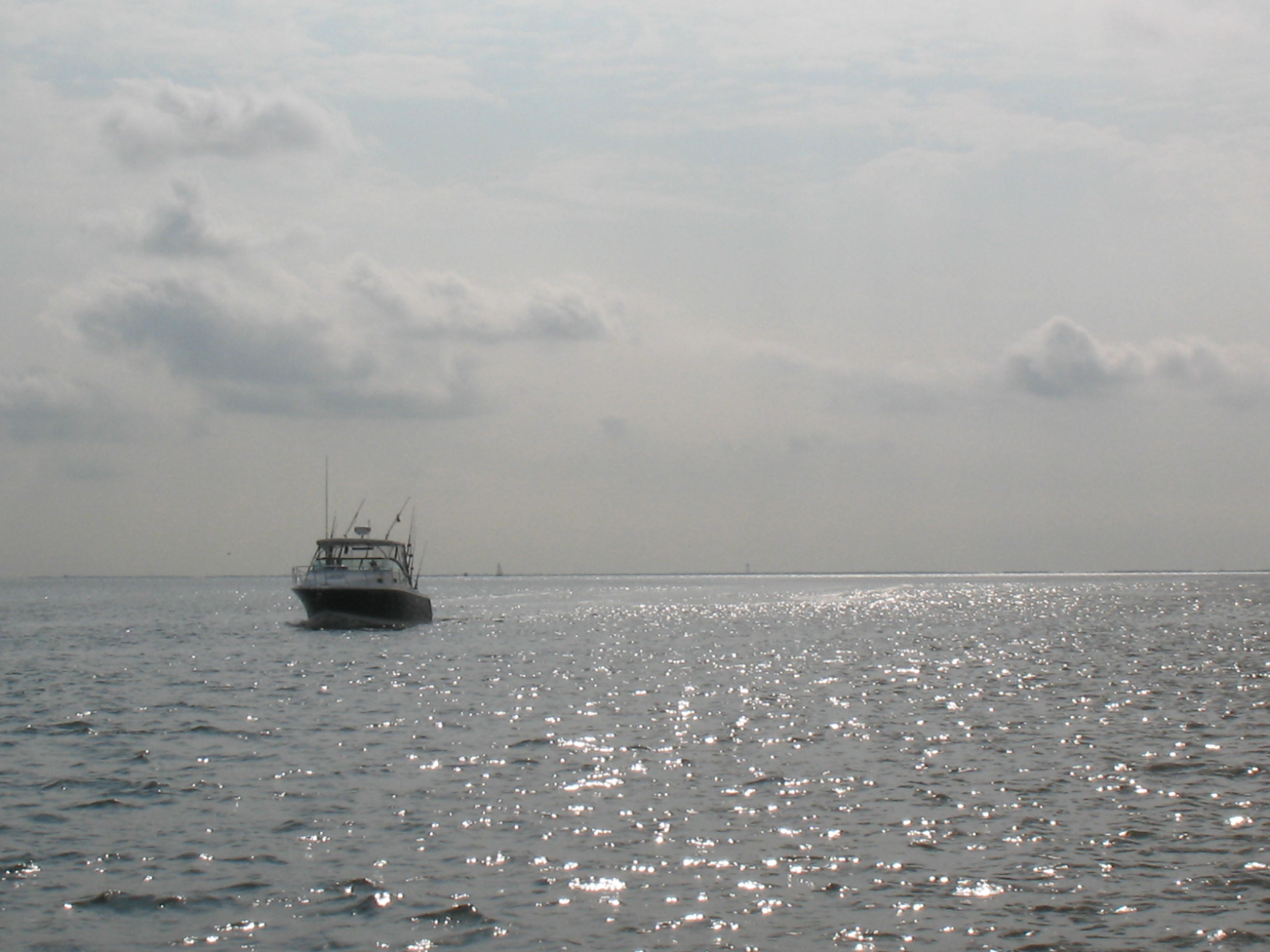
Patchogue Bay

Patchogue Bay is a lagoon on the south-central shores of Long Island in the U.S. state of New York.

Part of the Great South Bay, Patchogue Bay is a cove between the points of land known as Blue Point and Howells Point, and across which ferries run south to Fire Island.

== Habitat ==
A number of habitats make up the bay bottom; the dominant eelgrass Benthic habitat in the coves of Patchogue Bay which can be classified as muddy sandflat and sandflat habitats. Many species that are found in both habitats. Sandy bottom types worms, slipper shell, and blue mussel, and mud crab. Atlantic oyster dril, a predator of bivalves, is abundant in eelgrass beds in Patchogue and Bellport Bay, and rock crab. The distribution and abundance of benthic species in the bay's eelgrass community is likely controlled by a number of factors that include eelgrass stem density, water temperature and salinity, sediment type, predation, food supply, and human harvest. Much of the bay is open water, while marshes and flats have developed on the protected northern edge of the barrier beach that shelters Patchogue Bay and the mainland from the Atlantic Ocean. Extensive tidal marshes and flats have developed on the bay side of Fire Island as well. Eelgrass beds are concentrated in the shallow waters along the back side of Fire Island, Silversides, killifish, menhaden, and bay anchovy. Forage fish species are found throughout the various aquatic habitats in the bay at different times of the year. Atlantic silverside, the most dominant member through much of the year, in most of the bay. Bay anchovy is the major mid-bay water column occupant in the summer during its spawning time in late June and July. Killifishes include mummichog in the salt marsh habitats, striped killifish over sandy habitat, and sheepshead minnow in both habitats. Sticklebacks, including fourspine and threespine, are spring and summer spawners associated with submerged aquatic vegetation (SAV); although they are very abundant, their use as prey for other fish and birds is limited due to spines, body armor, and close association with vegetative cover. Northern pipefish s) is a zooplankton consumer preyed upon by both striped bass and summer flounder. American sandlance, probably the most abundant winter species, provides important forage for many species of special emphasis in the Bight. Summer flounder enter the bay in winter and spring and grow rapidly in the productive waters. The bay supports significant shellfishery for northern quahog and is a major spawning, nursery, and foraging area for blue crab.

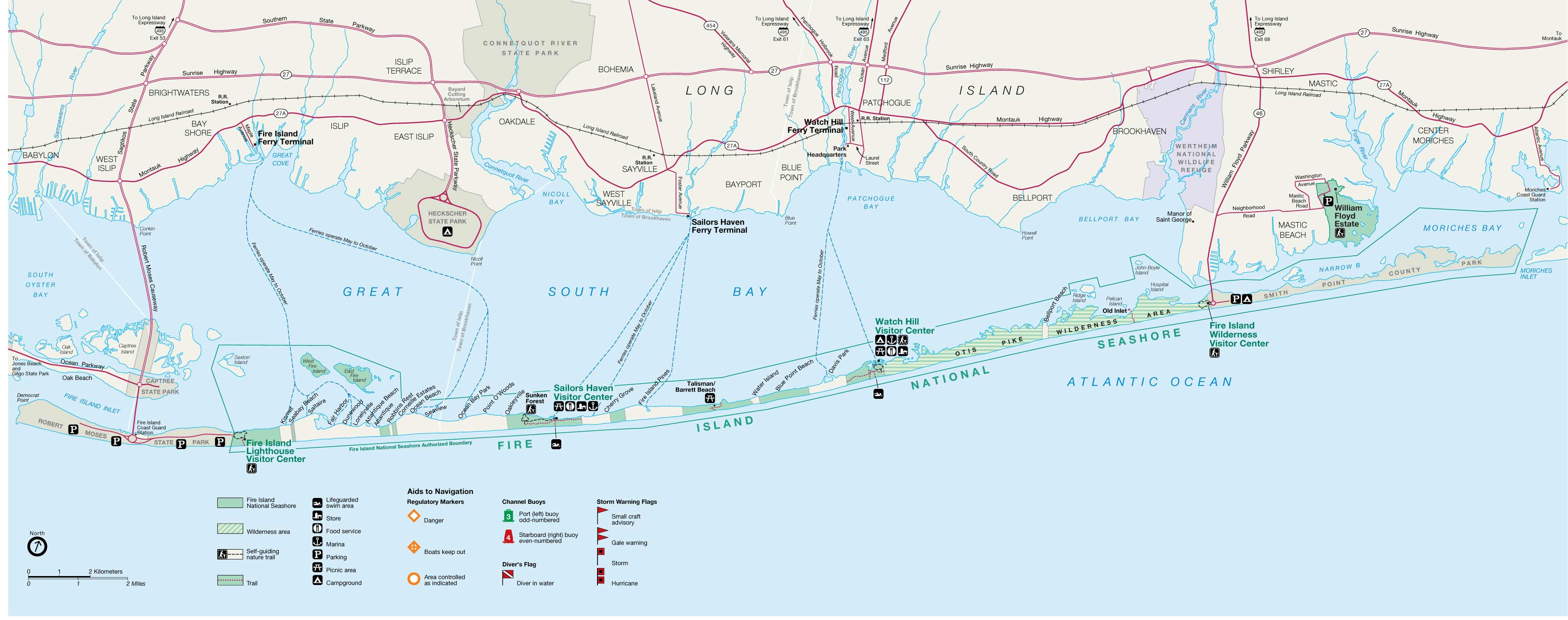
Map showing Patchogue Bay and Fire Island Ferry service.

Other common aquatic species occurring in the backbarrier lagoon systems of Long Island include blue mussel, bay scallop, eastern oyster, horseshoe crab, American eel, spot, Atlantic croaker, northern kingfish, and northern puffer. There are a number of significant trout resources in streams that drain into The Bay. Nine of the twelve verified wild brook trout populations of Long Island occur in the Bay's drainage. Patchogue's Swan River, and many other local tributaries such as Mud Creek, Patchogue Creek, and Terrel Creek all contain naturally reproducing populations of brook trout.

Today, hard clams are the bay's principal resource, but this was not always the case. The once well-known eastern oyster fishery collapsed in the 1940s and 1950s; that collapse was linked to algal blooms of a minute species that inhibited shellfish growth. These blooms were believed to be the result of high inputs of organic wastes, primarily from large-scale duck farms located on tributaries of the bay. A similar problem exists today in lawn fertilizer run off and is directly responsible for brown tide algae bloom and thus indirectly responsible for the collapse of the bay scallop population. During 1999 there was a significant spring drought, which may be verified through the Brookhaven National Laboratory meteorological records. That summer the bay was the cleanest it had been in living memory; one could see clean sand bottom through 5 to 6 feet of water at the edge of the flats. Local baymen and sailors aged 50 and older remarked that they had never seen the bay so clean. There was no "brown tide" algae bloom that year.

== Fire Island access and Patchogue bays and bridges ==
- Davis Park
- Watch Hill
- Fire Island National Seashore
- The Great South Bay
- Moriches Bay
- Swan River New York Google maps
- Pine Neck – (Boat launch)
- Patchogue River www.lat-long.com
- Sandspit Park Beach & Marina
- Shorefront Park – Patchogue (Bandshell)
- Mascot Dock & Marina
- South Shore Estuary
- Fire Island Wilderness
- Fire Island Inlet Bridge
- Great South Bay Bridge
- Outer Barrier Islands

== Photo gallery ==
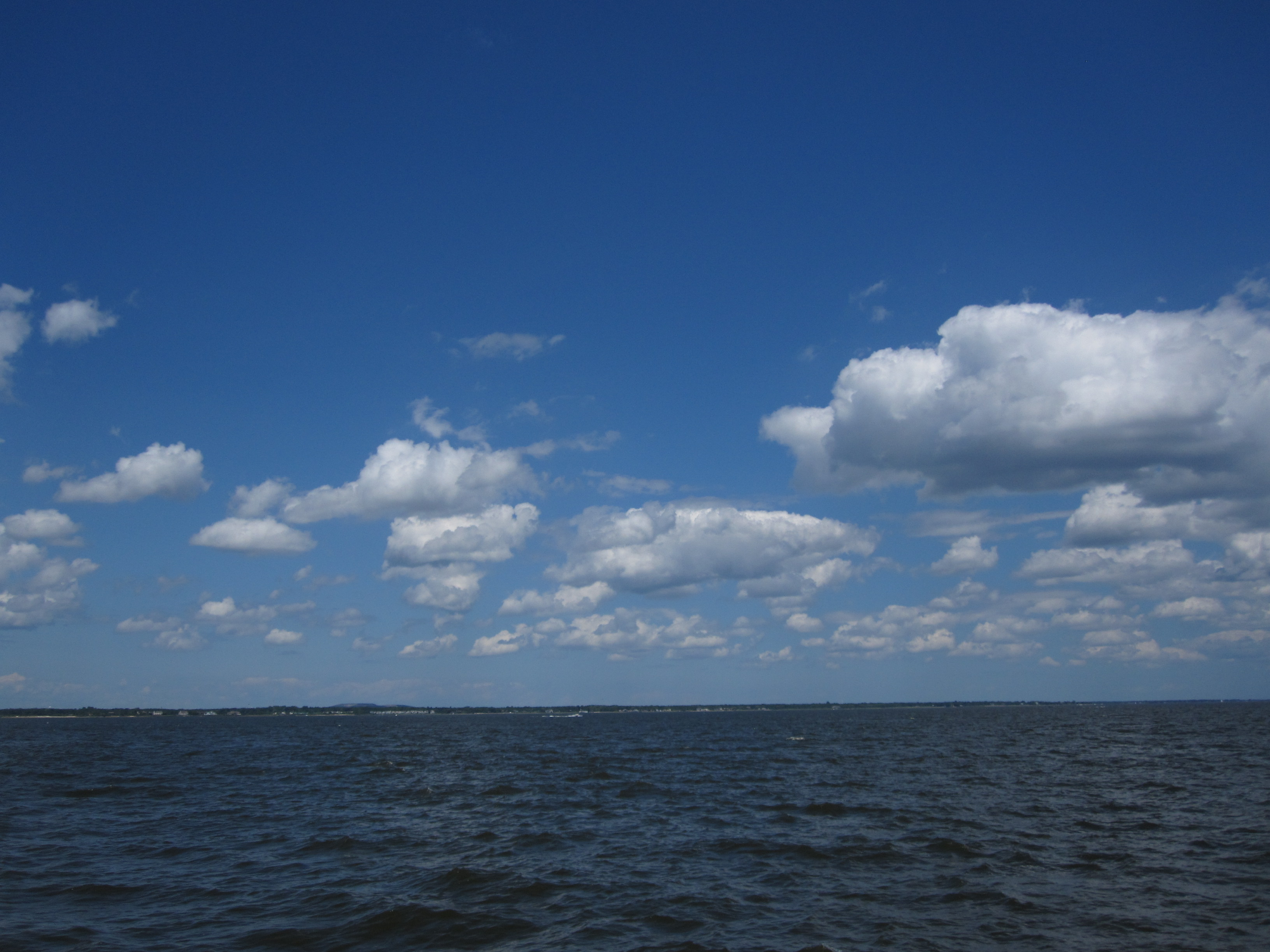

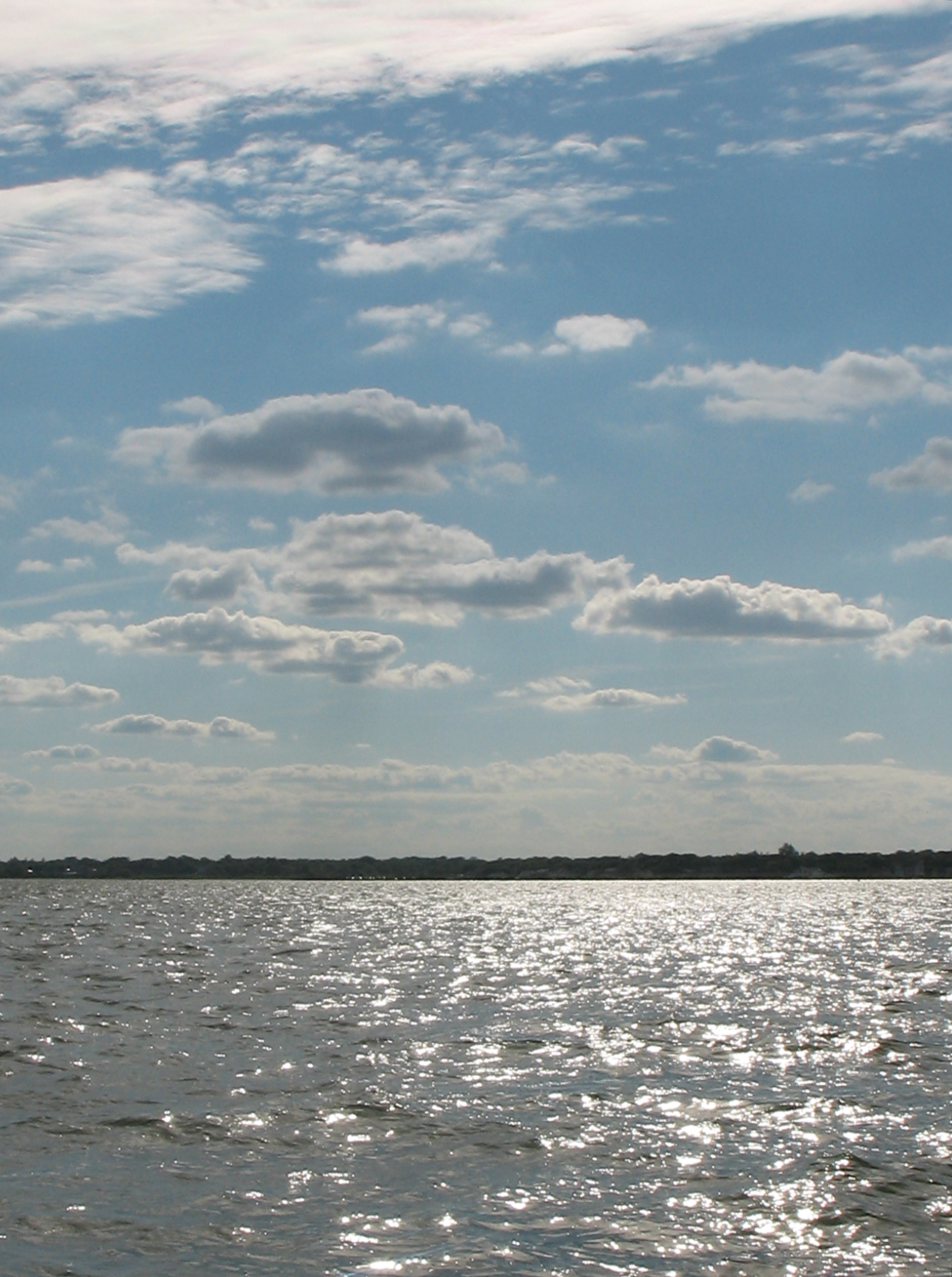

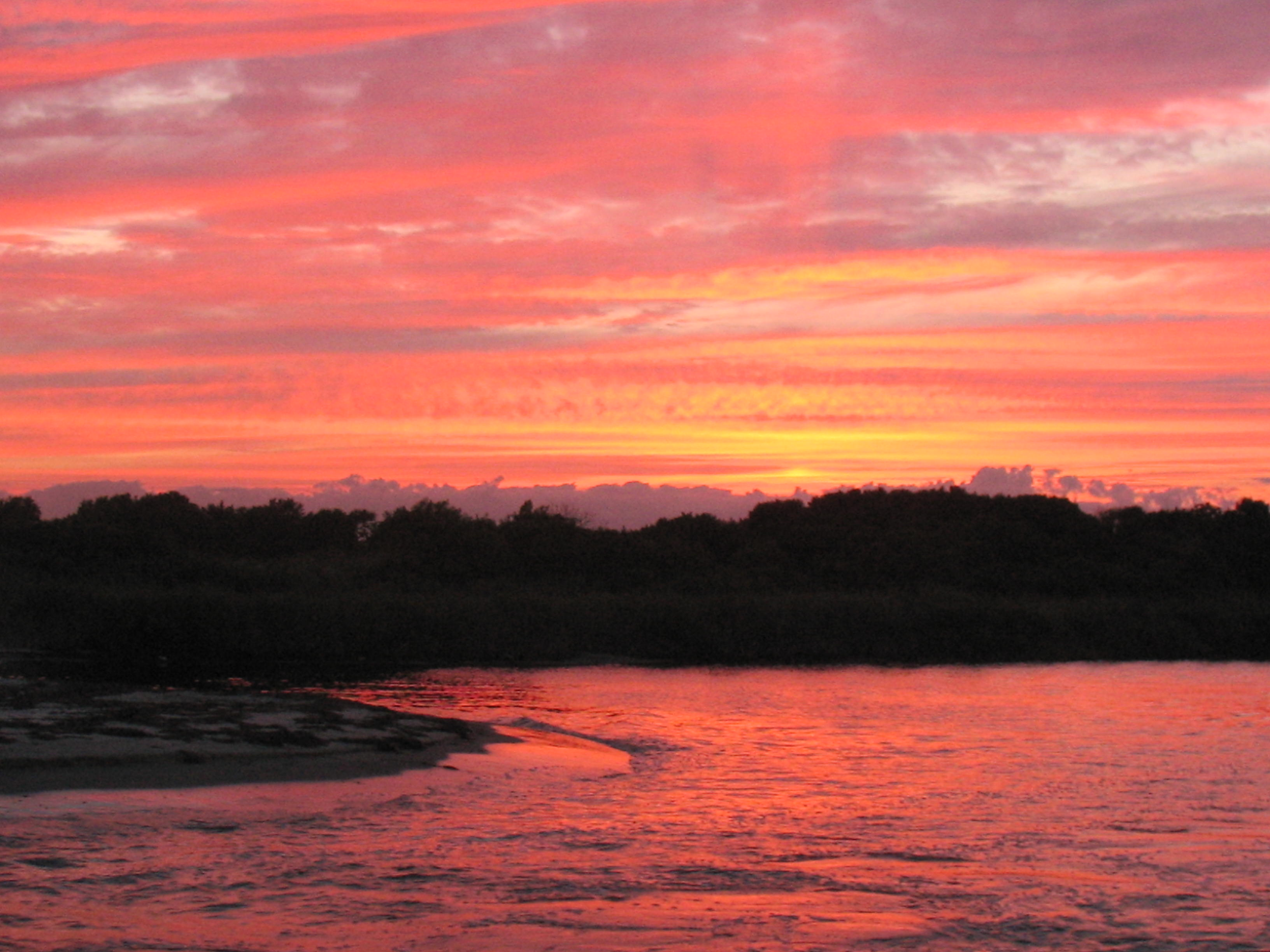

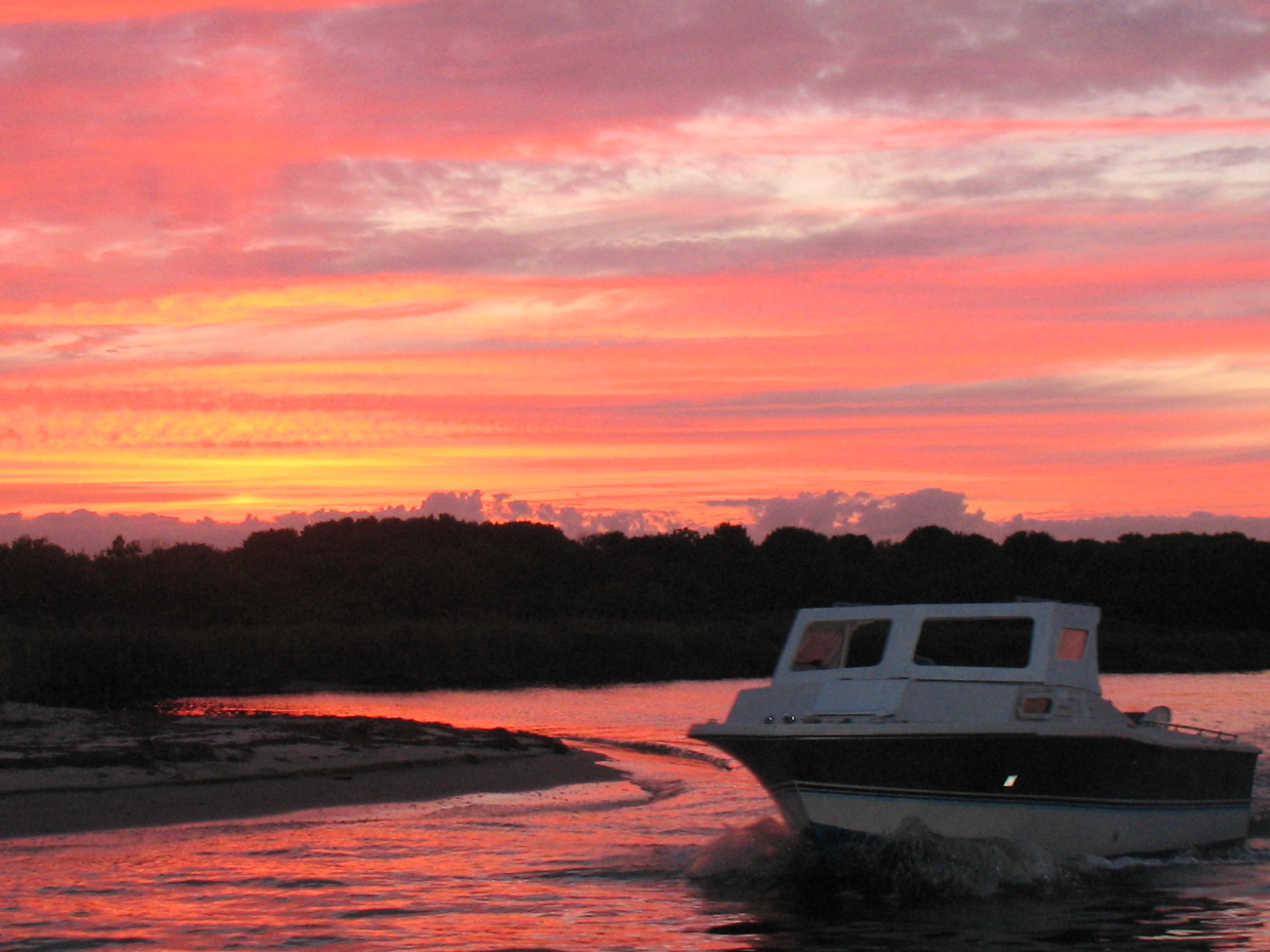

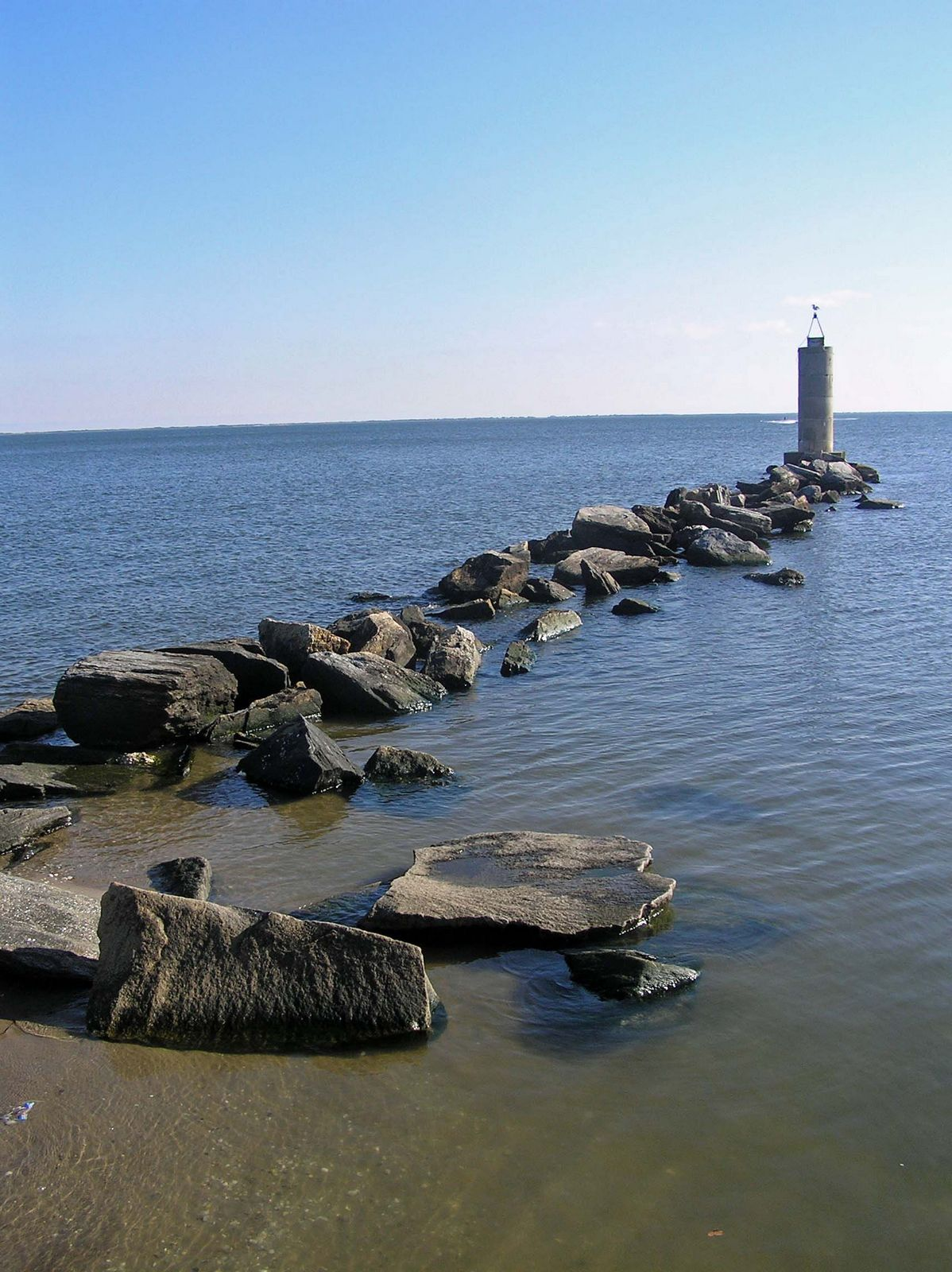

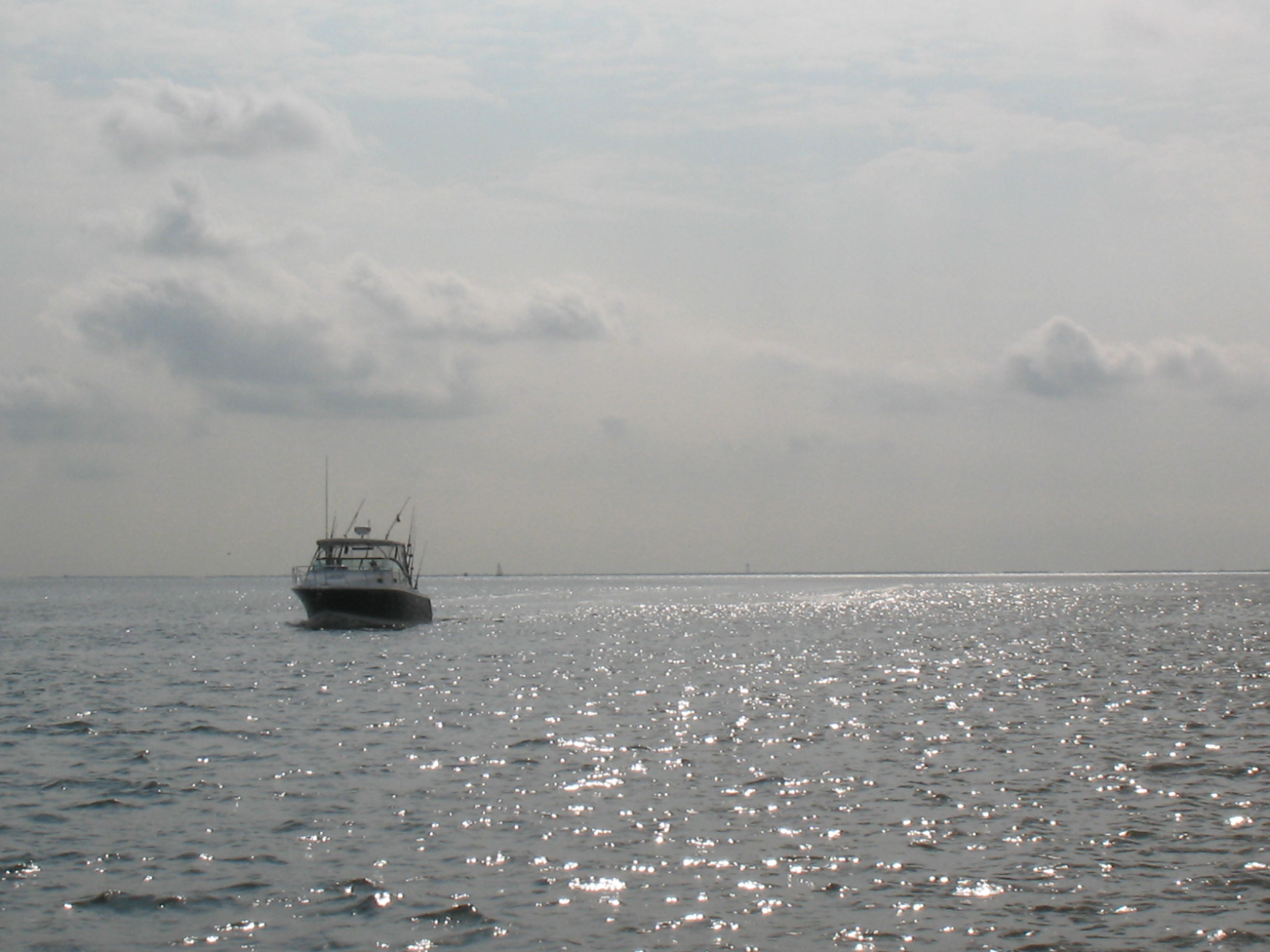

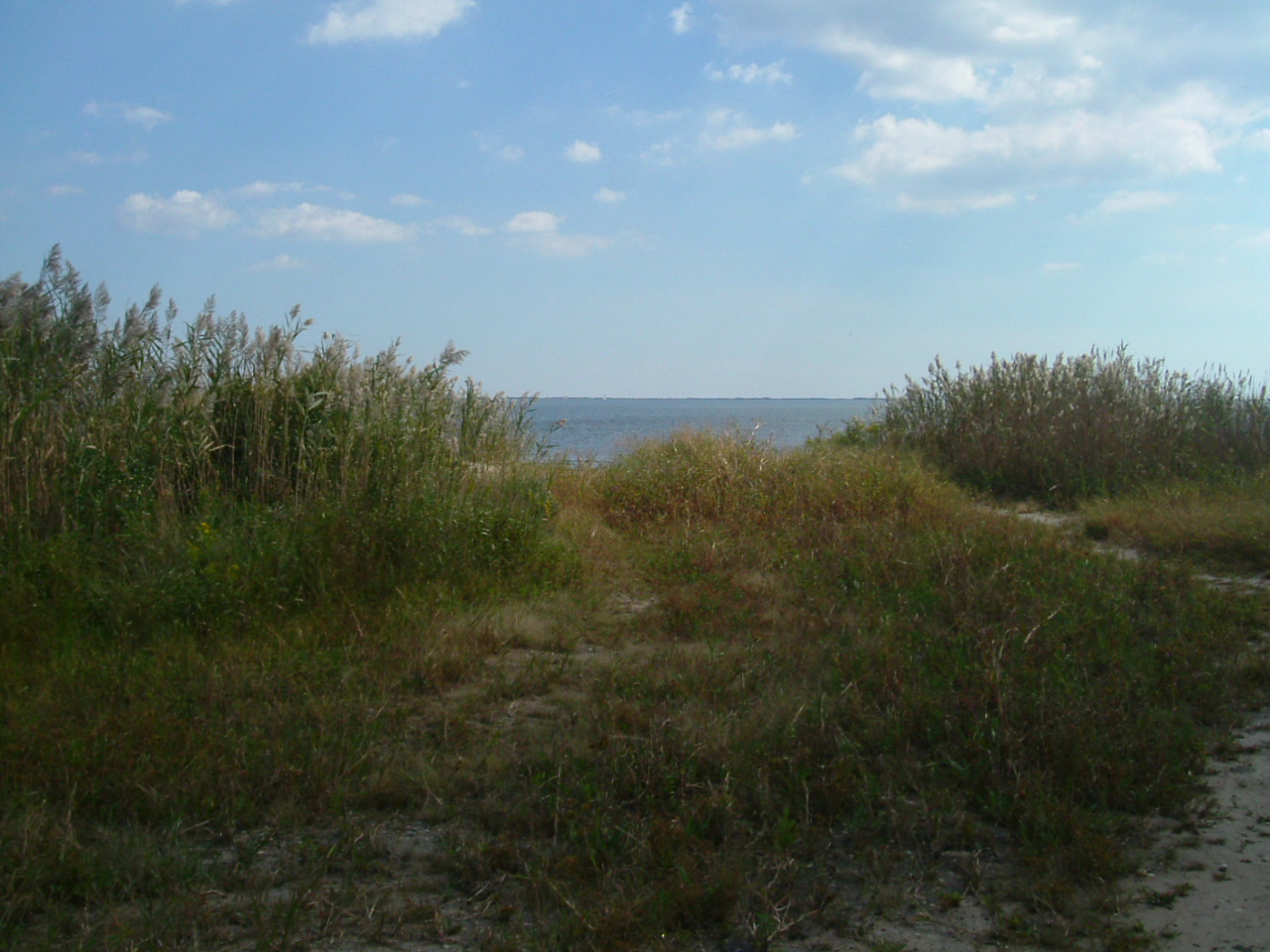

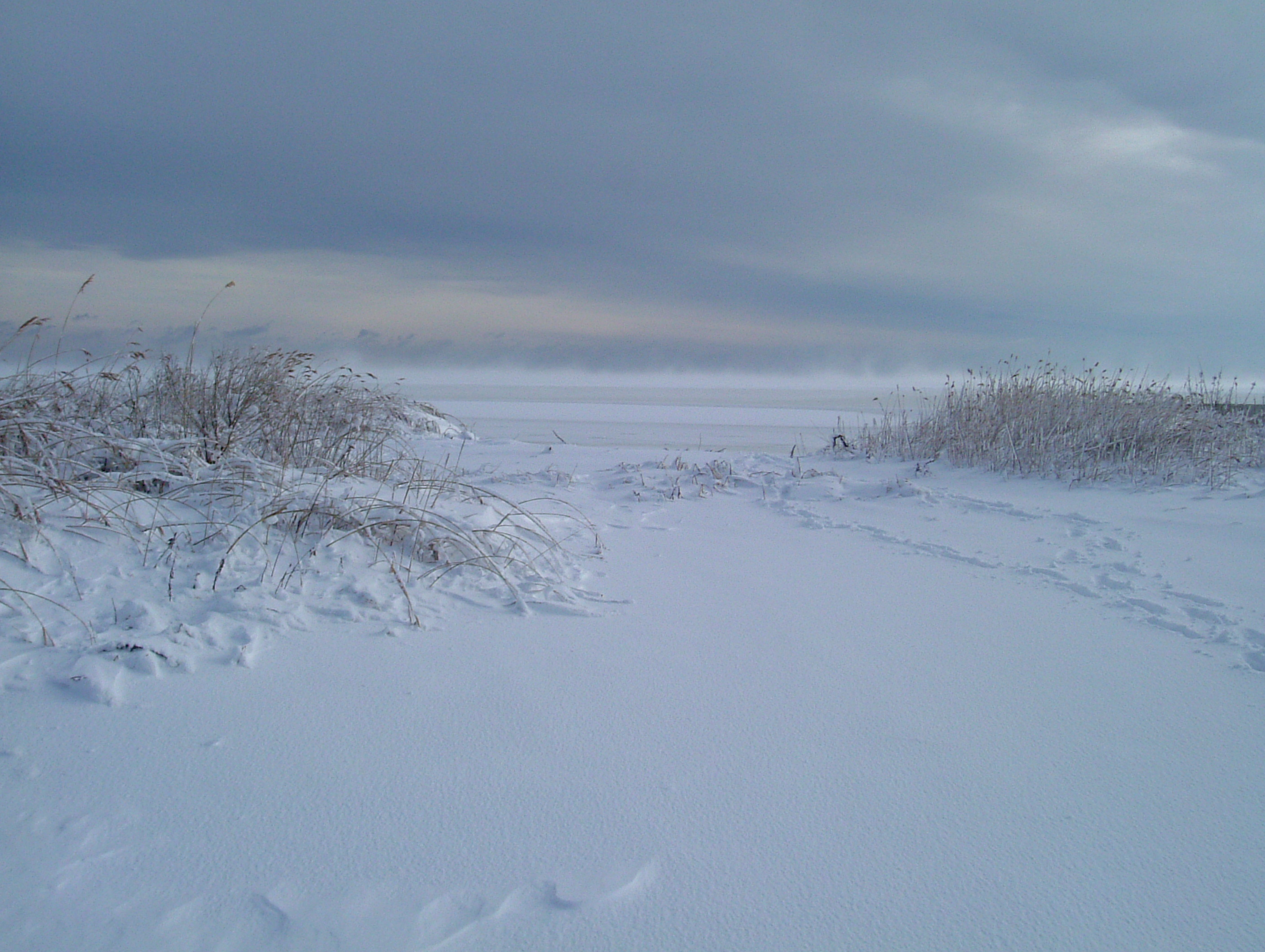

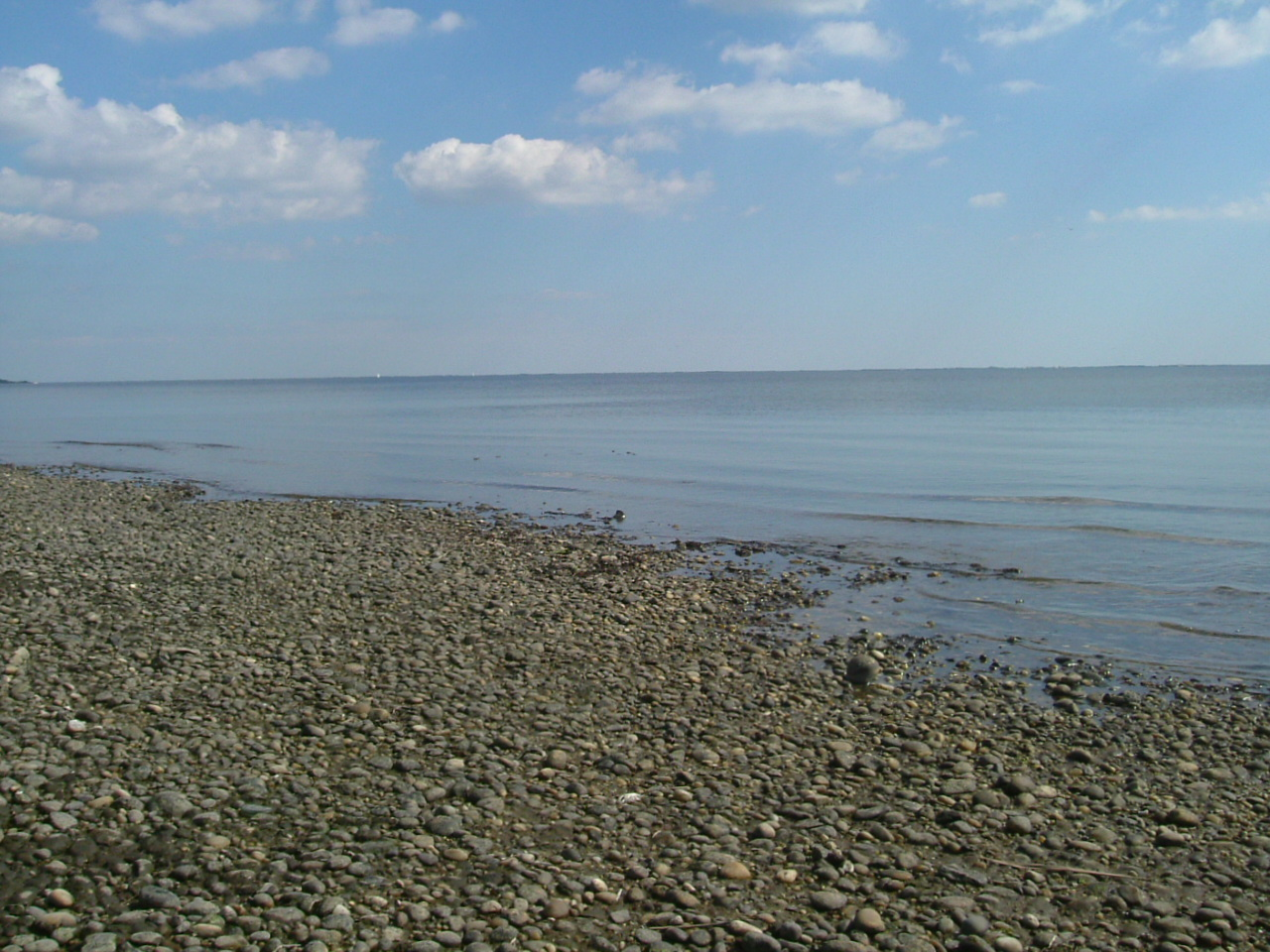

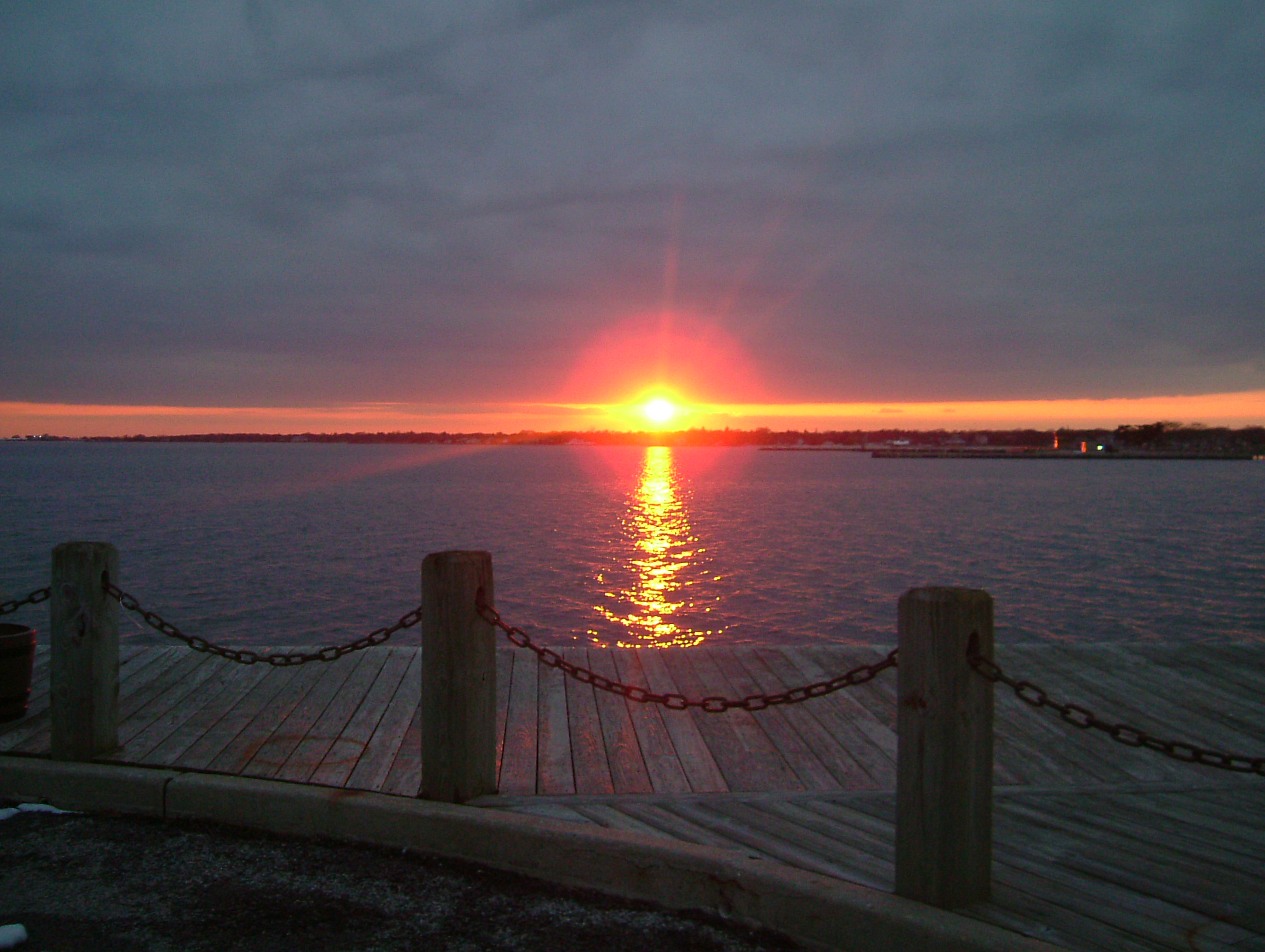

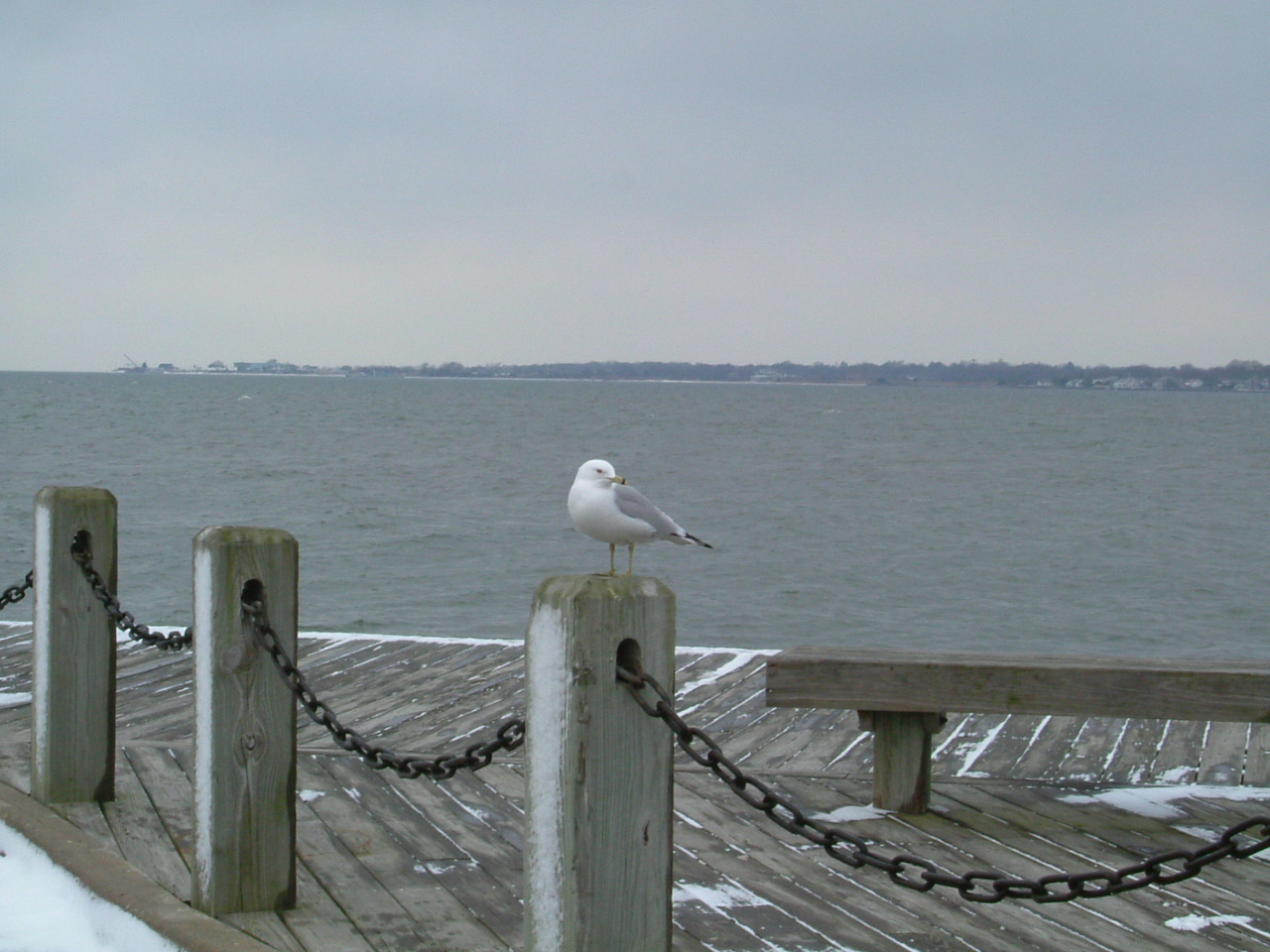

== See also ==
- Brookhaven
- Suffolk

== Notes ==
The original 17th Century Crown Patents, including the Nicolls, Dongan and Fletcher patents, gave certain Long Island townships title to the land within their bounds including the land under water (see O'Brien v Town of Huntington, 66 AD3d 160, 164 [2d Dept 2009]; Melby v Duffy, 304 AD3d 33 [2d Dept 2003]; Nance v Town of Oyster Bay, 23 AD2d 9 [2d Dept 1965]). The townships' ownership and control over these lands and water antedates the State and the Union itself and has been repeatedly upheld (see e.g. Lowndes v Huntington, 153 US 1; Trustees of Brookhaven v Strong, 60 NY 56; Rottenberg v Edwards, 103 AD2d 138 [2d Dept 1984]).
