= Ronkonkoma =

Ronkonkoma may refer to the following places in Long Island, New York, U.S.:

- Ronkonkoma, New York, a hamlet and census-designated place
- Ronkonkoma Branch, a rail service operated by the Long Island Rail Road
- Ronkonkoma station, a railroad station
- Lake Ronkonkoma (lake), a freshwater lake in Suffolk County
- Lake Ronkonkoma, New York, a hamlet and census-designated place
