= Great South Bay =

Bay in New York State, United States

Coordinates: 40°41′25″N 73°06′07″W

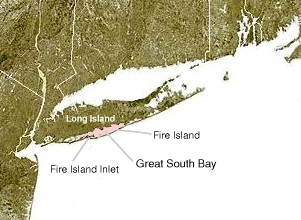
Map showing the location of the Great South Bay

The Great South Bay is a lagoon situated between Long Island and Fire Island, in the State of New York. It is about 45 miles (72 km) long and has an average depth of 4 feet 3 inches (1.3 m) and is 20 feet (6.1 m) at its deepest. It is protected from the Atlantic Ocean by Fire Island, a barrier island, as well as the eastern end of Jones Beach Island and Captree Island.

The Robert Moses Causeway adjoins the Great South Bay Bridge, which leads to Robert Moses State Park.

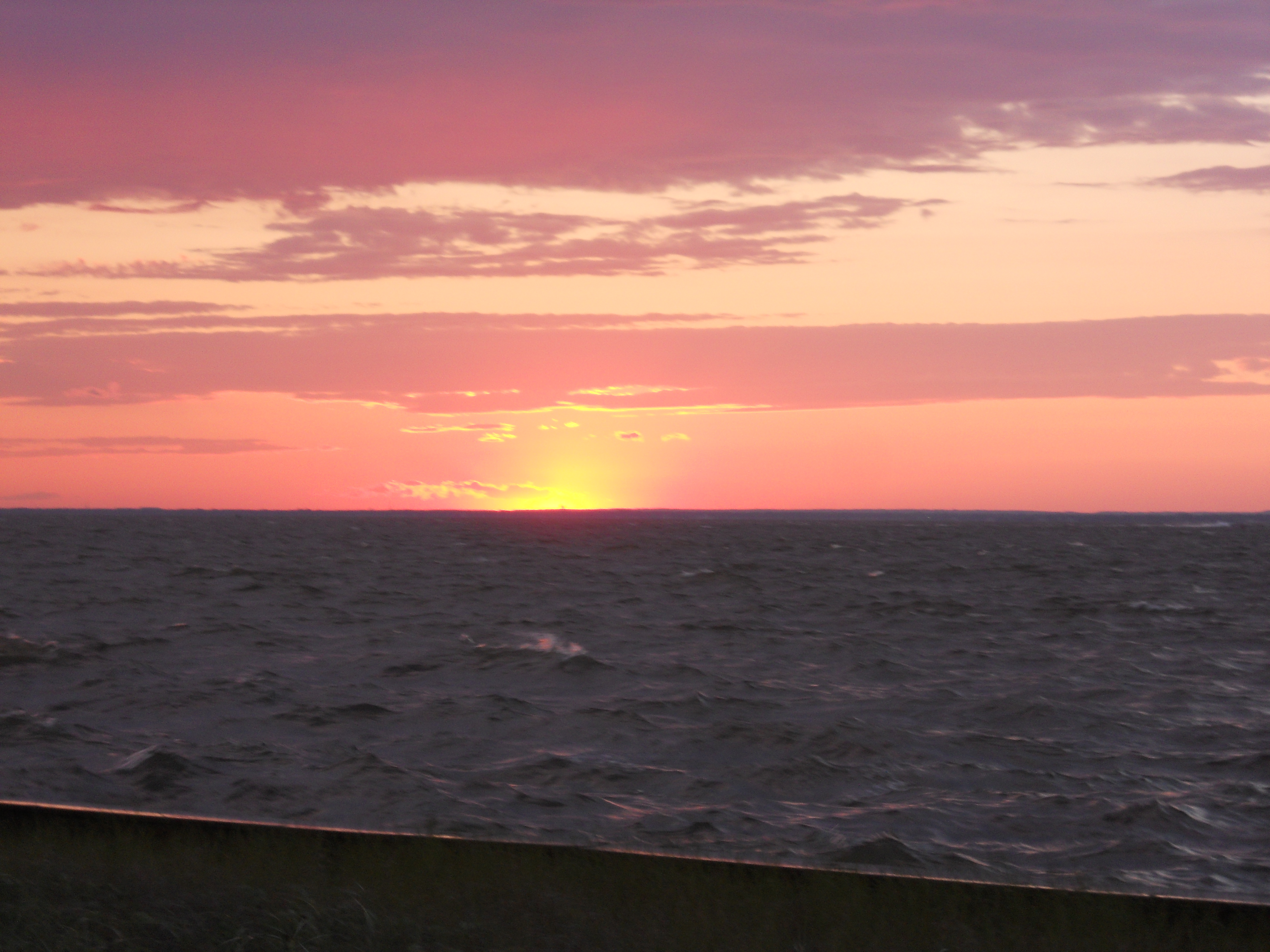
Sunset over the bay

The bay is accessible from the ocean through Fire Island Inlet, which lies between the western tip of Fire Island and the eastern tip of Jones Beach Island. The bay adjoins South Oyster Bay on its western end, and Patchogue and Moriches bays at the east end.

== History ==
In the early 17th century, European settlers first encountered the Indigenous Montaukett people. Among the earliest British families were the Smith, Carman and Hewlett families. Long Island's South Shore, adjacent to the bay, now includes the communities of Lindenhurst, Babylon, Islip, Oakdale, Sayville, Bayport, Blue Point, Patchogue, Bellport, Shirley, and Mastic Beach.

== Environmental concerns ==
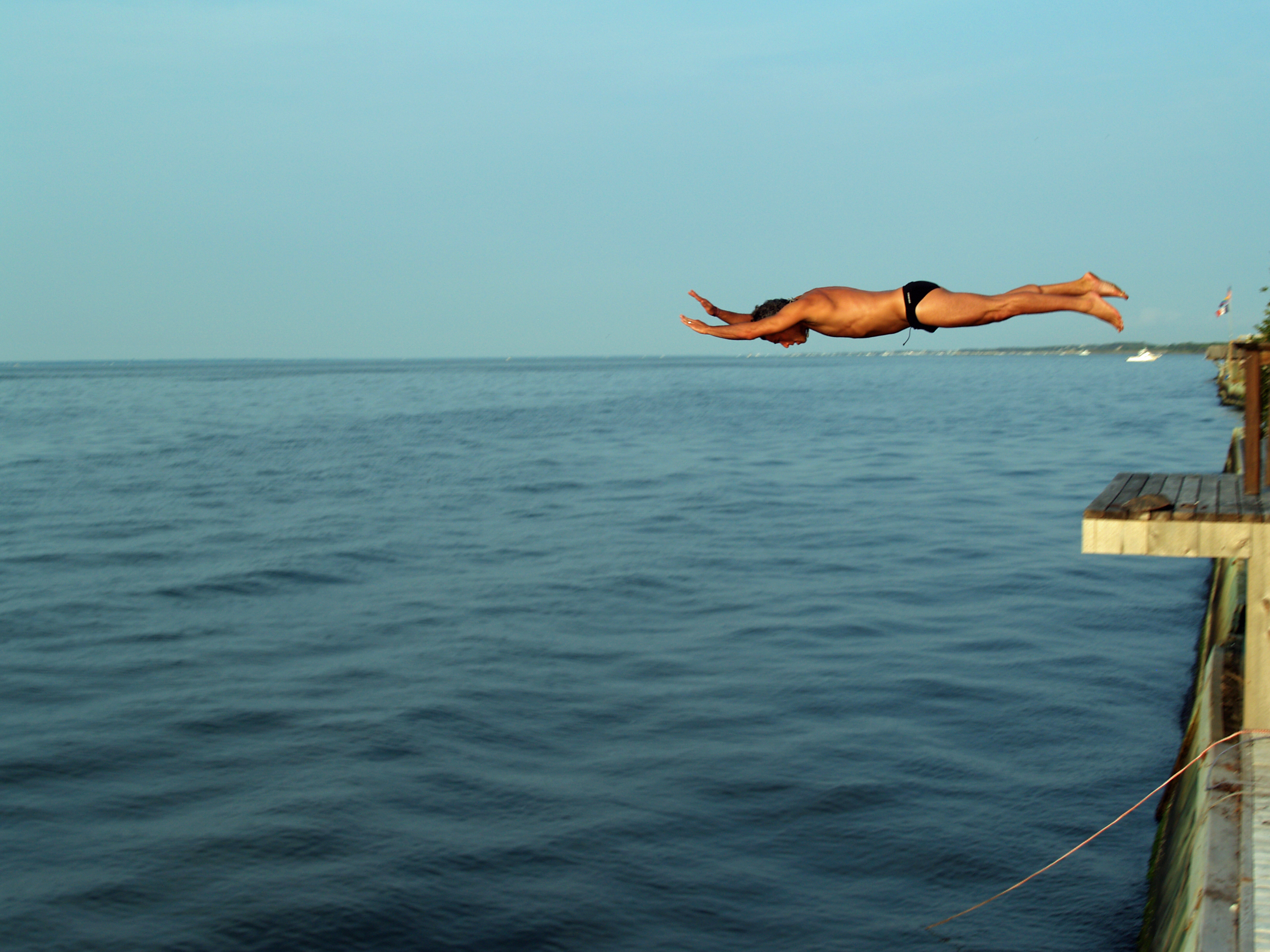
A man dives into the bay

In the late nineteenth century Great South Bay provided many of the clams consumed throughout the region and even the country. The first oysters to be exported from the US to Europe came from Great South Bay. The Great South Bay has, at least since the end of the Ice Age, been home to many generations of horseshoe crabs. By the latter 20th century, a significant percentage of the habitat was lost. Hurricane Sandy in 2012, the largest storm to affect the region since 1938, made landfall with devastating impact to Fire Island seashores, including multiple breaches. The largest of these was at Old Inlet, south of Bellport. Residents were concerned it would have effects on tidal increases and potential flooding, but it has allowed the bay to relieve some of its captive water, which has improved the salinity and nitrogen levels in the bay. After roughly 75 years, the bay began flushing itself out which may improve the water condition within the bay. Regulations set forth by the US Government National Wildlife Preserve, which has a seven-mile stretch of land (the Otis Pike Fire Island High Dune Wilderness) prohibit any unauthorized parties from performing any kind of man-made changes, thus the inlet has remained open. There have been a number of ongoing public meetings discussing the future of the Inlet. All the other breaches were closed by the Army Corps of Engineers. In 2012, The Save the Great South Bay (STGSB) not-for-profit organization was formed in order to work towards better conservation of the water and its beachfronts. Save The Great South Bay has raised awareness of boat sewage dumping in The Great South Bay as a serious ecological concern.

== Folklore ==
The Great South Bay landscape has inspired numerous local myths and legends over the centuries. Many of these stories are centered around lost treasures, shipwrecks, ghosts, and piracy. One of the most prominent Great South Bay legends asserts that the Fire Island Lighthouse is haunted by the ghosts of a lighthouse keeper and his daughter. The story goes that the lighthouse keeper's daughter got sick and that the keeper was unable to secure help in time to save her life. The grieving father then responded by hanging himself in the tower. Now, the ghosts of father and daughter are said to haunt the historic structure. Several paranormal enthusiasts conducted an investigation on January 7, 2022, capturing several pieces of evidence for purported ghostly activity. The images and videos captured on that night were later published by Fire Island & Great South Bay News. A new piece of local lore emerged from an April Fools' article published by the same local newspaper asserting that a new species of giant eight-foot-long horseshoe crabs had taken up residence in the bay. This cryptid story then spread around the internet, further enhancing the local mythology of the region.

== See also ==
- South Shore Estuary
