= Suffolk County, New York =

County in New York, United States

- County
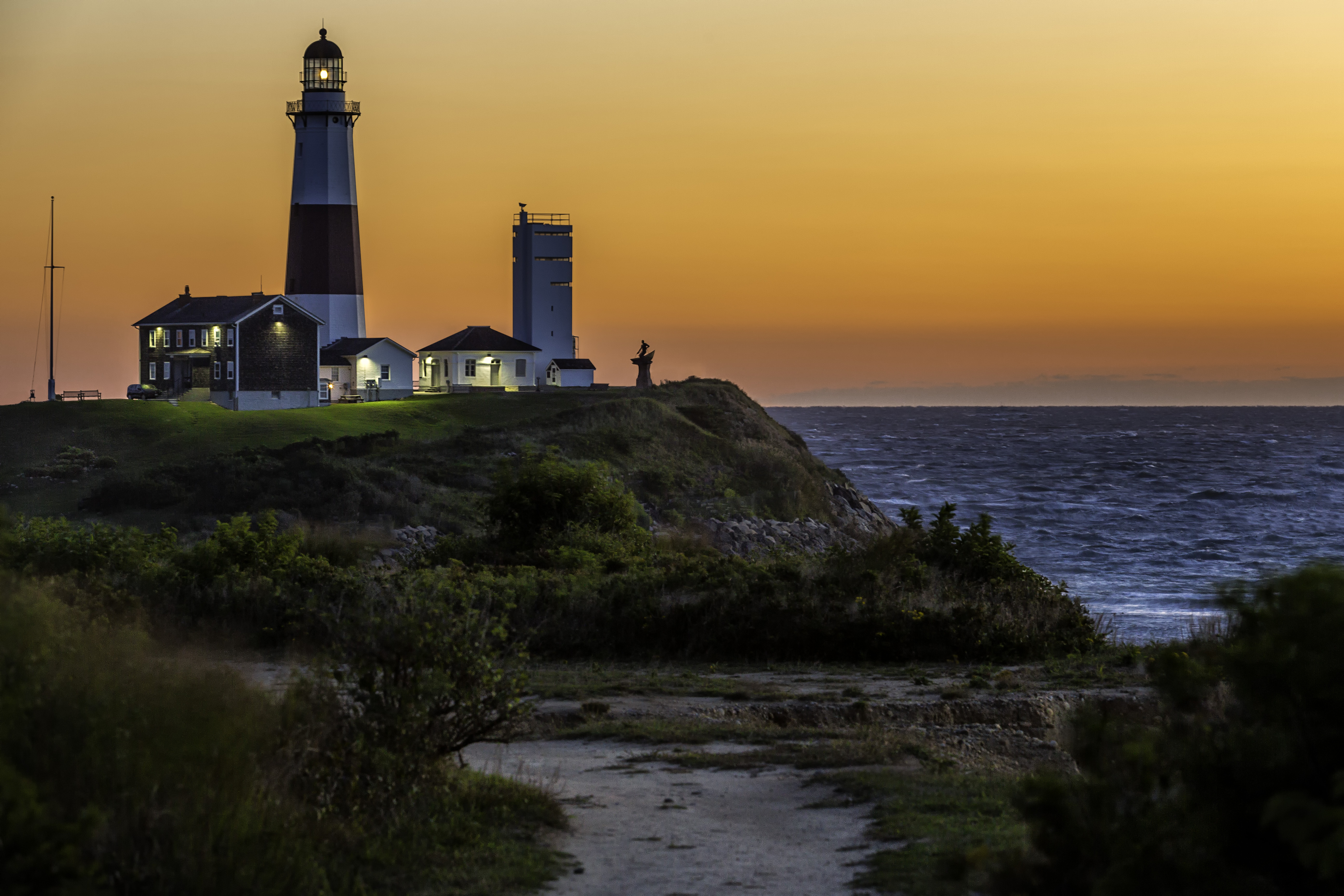
- Dawn over Montauk Point Light winter

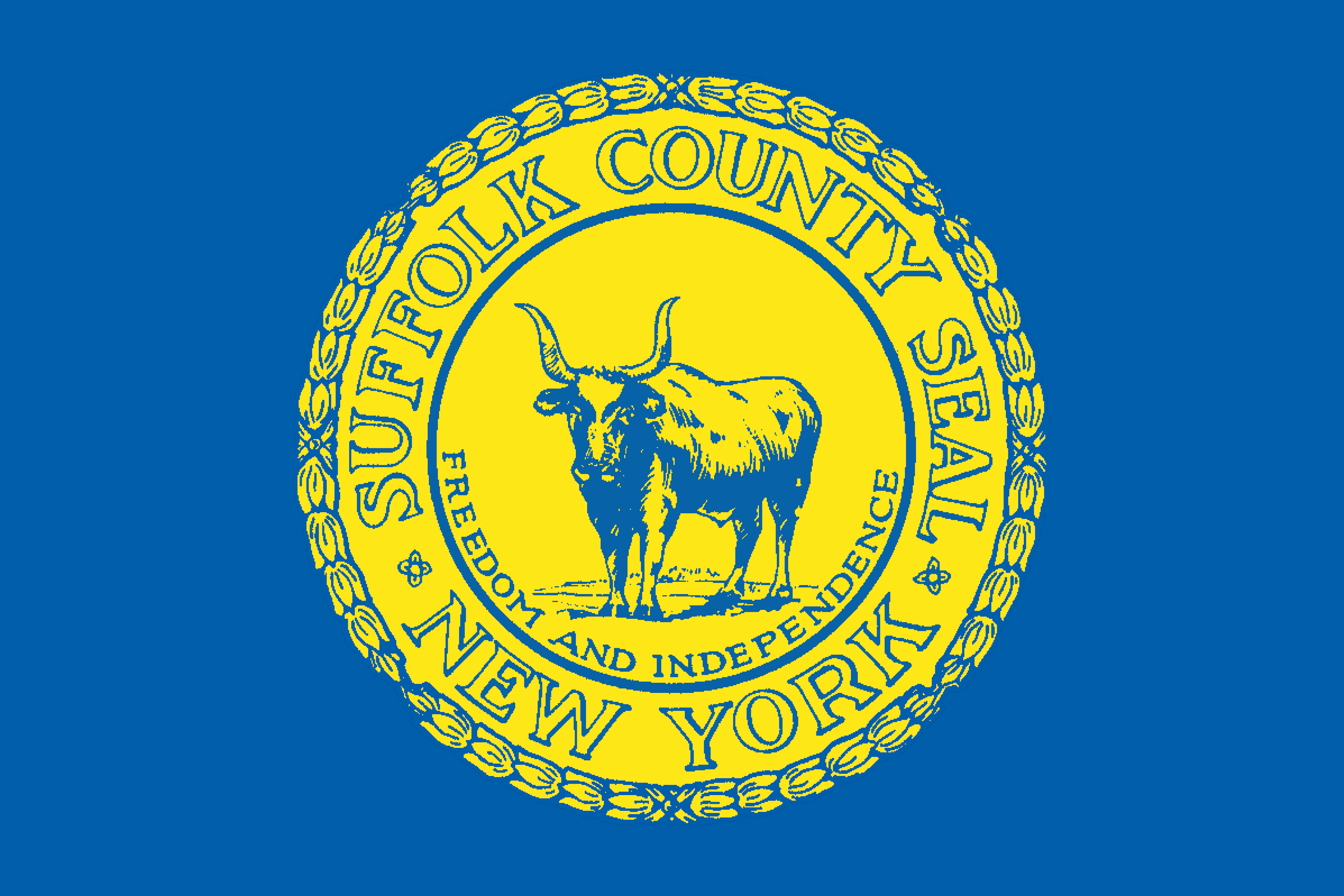
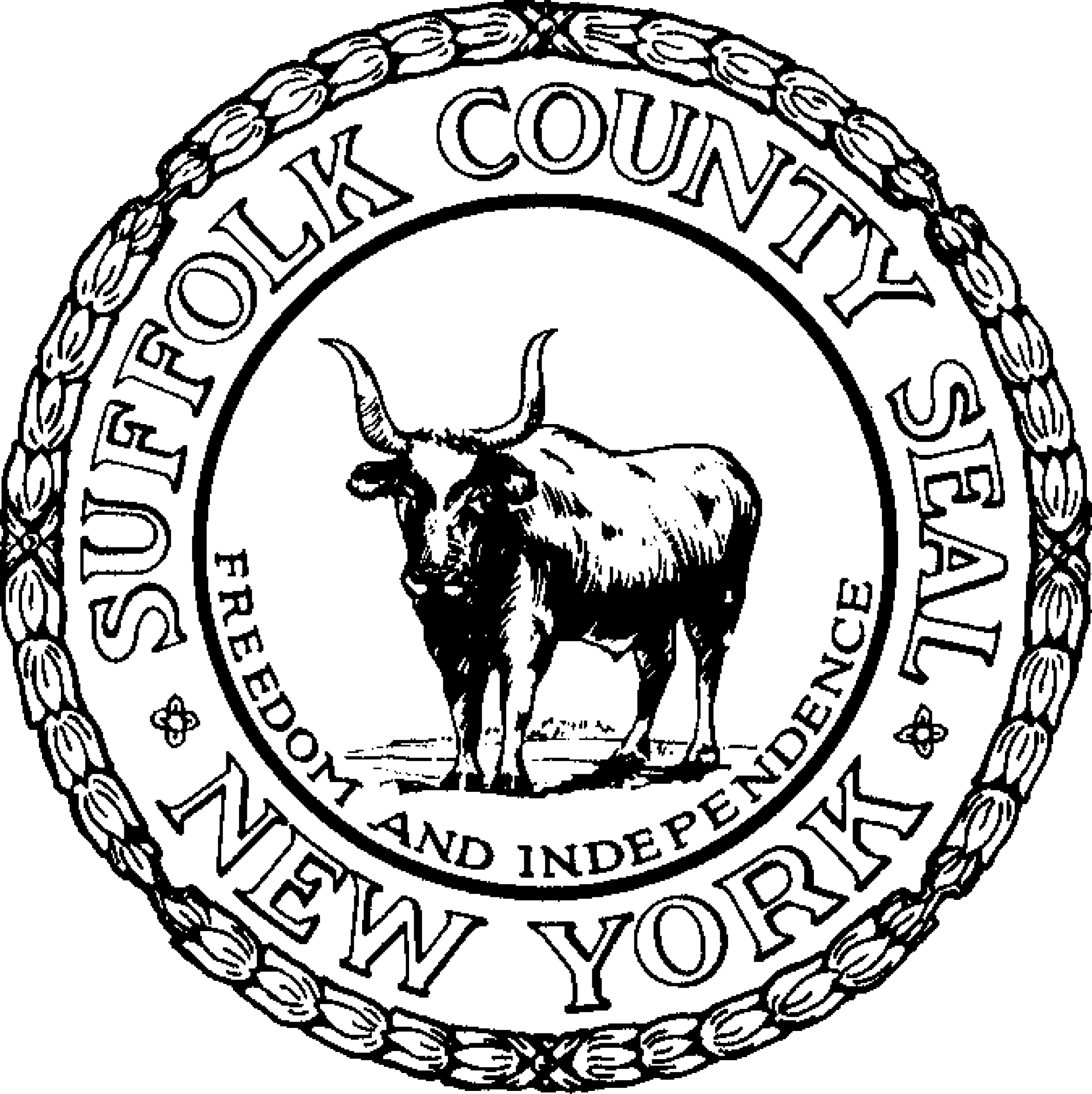
- Flag Seal

- Location within the U.S. state of New York
- Coordinates: 40.94°N 72.68°W
- Country: United States
- State: New York
- Founded: 1683
- Named for: Suffolk, England
- Seat: Riverhead
- Largest town: Brookhaven

Government
  - Executive: Edward P. Romaine (R)

Area
  - Total: 2,373 sq mi (6,150 km^{2})
  - Land: 912 sq mi (2,360 km^{2})
  - Water: 1,461 sq mi (3,780 km^{2}) 62%

Population (2020)
  - Total: 1,525,920
  - Estimate (2025): 1,546,090 ▲
  - Density: 1,670/sq mi (646/km^{2})

GDP
  - Total: US$139.014 billion (2024)
  - Per capita: US$90,074 (2024)
- Time zone: UTC−5 (Eastern)
  - Summer (DST): UTC−4 (EDT)
- Congressional districts: 1st, 2nd, 3rd
- Website: www.suffolkcountyny.gov

Interactive map of Suffolk County, New York

Suffolk County (/ˈsʌfək/ SUF-ək) is the easternmost county in the U.S. state of New York, constituting the eastern two-thirds of Long Island. Suffolk is bordered to its west by Nassau County, to its east by Gardiners Bay and the open Atlantic Ocean, to its north by Long Island Sound, and to its south by the Atlantic Ocean.

As of the 2020 United States census, Suffolk County's population was 1,525,920, its highest decennial count ever, making Suffolk the fourth-most populous county in the State of New York and the most populous outside of the boroughs of New York City. Its county seat is Riverhead, though most county offices are in Hauppauge. The county was named after the county of Suffolk in England, the origin of its earliest European settlers.

Suffolk County incorporates the easternmost extreme of both the New York City metropolitan area and New York State. The geographically largest of Long Island's four counties and the second-largest of New York's 62 counties, Suffolk County is 86 miles (138 km) in length and 26 miles (42 km) in width at its widest (including water). Most of the island is near sea level, with over 1,000 miles (1,600 kilometers) of coastline.

Like other parts of Long Island, the county's high population density and proximity to New York City has resulted in a diverse economy, including industry, science, agriculture, fishery, and tourism. Housing affordability has become a significant concern in Suffolk County, as the median home price has climbed above US$760,000. Prominent scientific research facilities in Suffolk County include Brookhaven National Laboratory in Upton and Plum Island Animal Disease Center on Plum Island. The county is home to Stony Brook University in Stony Brook and Farmingdale State College in East Farmingdale.

== History ==
Suffolk County was part of the Connecticut Colony before becoming an original county of the province of New York, one of twelve created in 1683. From 1664 until 1683, it had been the East Riding of Yorkshire. Its boundaries were essentially the same as at present, with only minor changes in the boundary with its western neighbor, which was originally Queens County but has been Nassau County since the separation of Nassau from Queens in 1899.

During the American Revolutionary War, Great Britain occupied Suffolk County after the retreat of George Washington's forces in the Battle of Long Island, and the county remained under occupation until the British evacuation of New York on November 25, 1783.

According to the Suffolk County website, the county is the leading agricultural county in the state of New York, saying that: "The weather is temperate, clean water is abundant, and the soil is so good that Suffolk is the leading agricultural county in New York State. That Suffolk is still number one in farming, even with the development that has taken place, is a tribute to thoughtful planning, along with the excellent soil, favorable weather conditions, and the work of the dedicated farmers in this region."

== Geography ==
According to the U.S. Census Bureau, the county has an area of 2,373 square miles (6,150 km^{2}), of which 912 square miles (2,360 km^{2}) is land and 1,461 square miles (3,780 km^{2}) (62%) is water. It is the second-largest county in New York by total area and occupies 66% of the land area of Long Island.

Suffolk County occupies the central and eastern part of Long Island, in the extreme east of the State of New York. The eastern end of the county splits into two peninsulas, known as the North Fork and the South Fork. The county is surrounded by water on three sides, including the Atlantic Ocean and Long Island Sound, with 980 miles (1,580 km) of coastline. The eastern end contains large bays.

The highest elevation in the county, and on Long Island as a whole, is Jayne's Hill in West Hills, at 401 feet (122 m) above sea level. A low-lying coastal geography overall has led to Sufflok County incorporating shoreline resilience strategies related to sea level rise into urban planning.

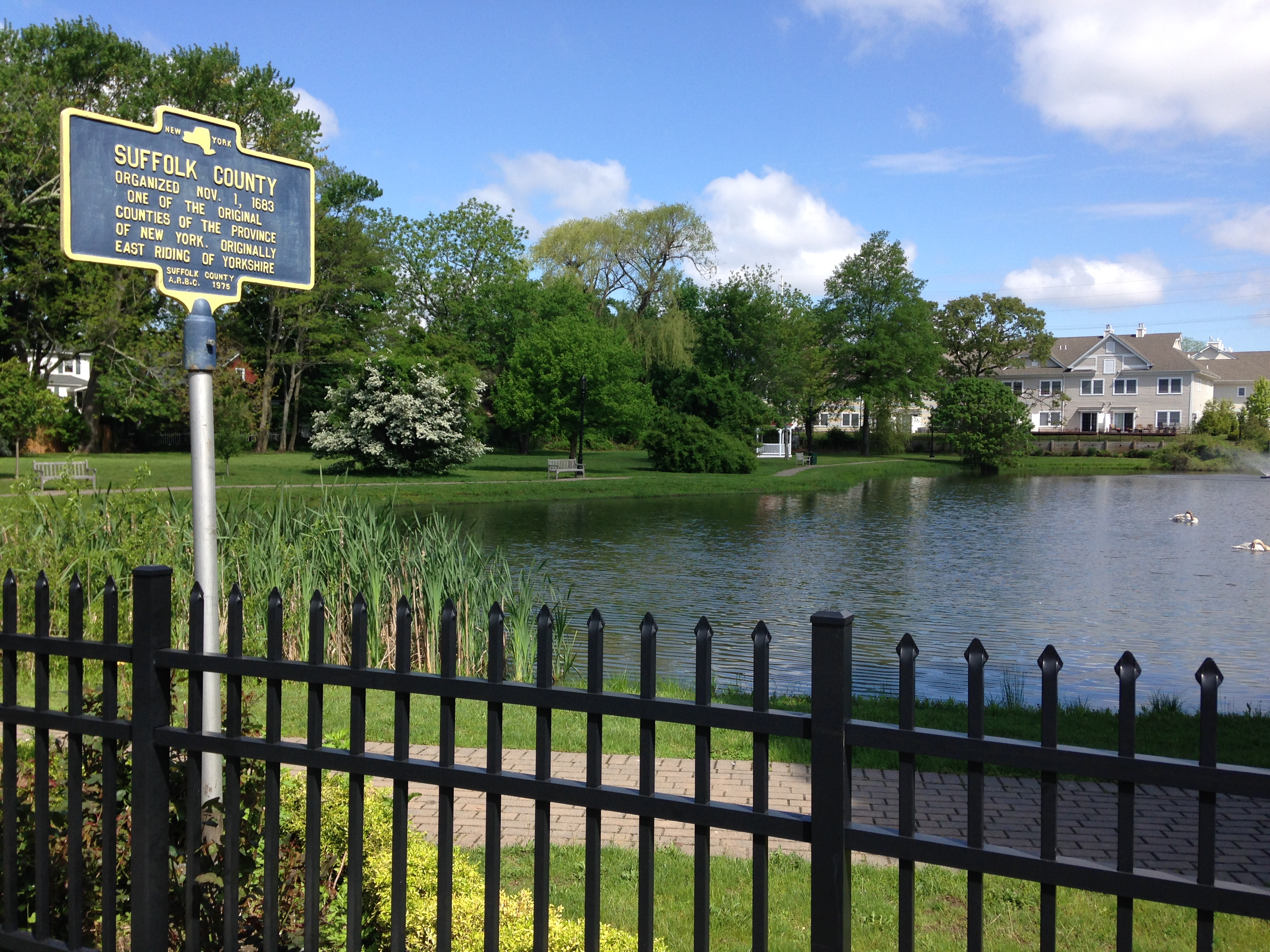
Sign referring to Suffolk County's 1683 founding located in Peterkin Park on Oak Street in Amityville.

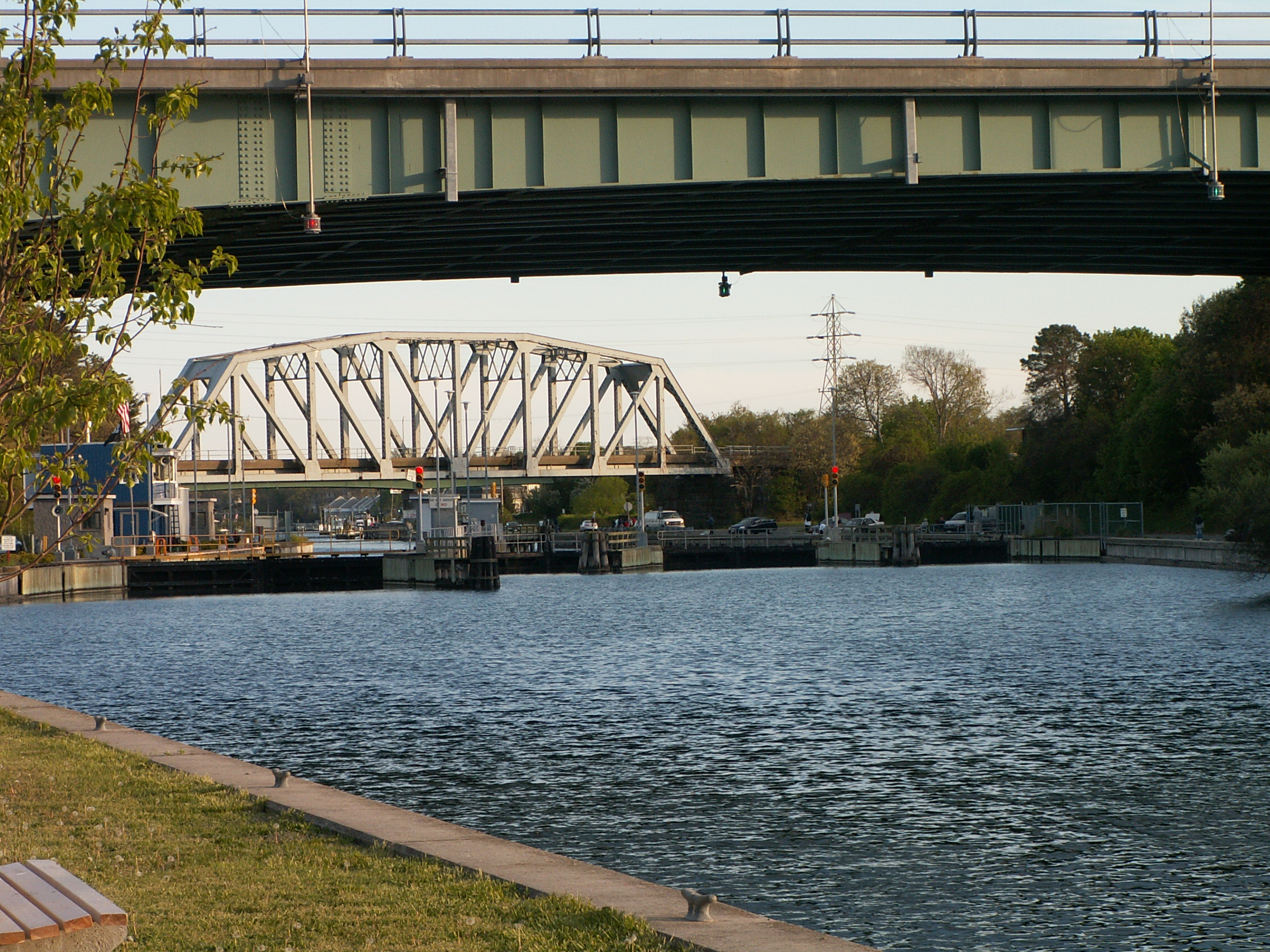
Shinnecock Canal, located in Hampton Bays, New York

=== Climate ===
Suffolk County sits at the convergence of climate zones including the humid continental (Dfa) and humid subtropical (Cfa), bordering closely on an oceanic climate (Cfb). The majority of the county by land area is in the Dfa zone. Summers are cooler at the East end than in the western part of the county. The hardiness zone is 7a, except in Copiague Harbor, Lindenhurst, and Montauk, where it is 7b. Average monthly temperatures in Hauppauge range from 31.0 °F (−0.6 °C) in January to 74.0 °F (23.3 °C) in July, and in the Riverhead town center they range from 30.1 °F (−1.1 °C) in January to 72.8 °F (22.7 °C) in July, which includes both daytime and nighttime temperatures. On February 23, 2026, Central Islip in Suffolk County was besieged by 31 inches of snow, making it the largest single-day snowfall on record in Suffolk.

Climate data for Montauk, New York (1981–2010 normals)
Month	Jan	Feb	Mar	Apr	May	Jun	Jul	Aug	Sep	Oct	Nov	Dec	Year
Mean daily maximum °F (°C)	38.1 (3.4)	40.1 (4.5)	45.6 (7.6)	54.5 (12.5)	64.2 (17.9)	73.3 (22.9)	79.3 (26.3)	78.9 (26.1)	71.9 (22.2)	62.6 (17.0)	53.0 (11.7)	43.6 (6.4)	58.8 (14.9)
Daily mean °F (°C)	32.3 (0.2)	33.7 (0.9)	39.0 (3.9)	47.5 (8.6)	56.6 (13.7)	66.4 (19.1)	72.4 (22.4)	72.2 (22.3)	65.7 (18.7)	56.4 (13.6)	47.2 (8.4)	37.9 (3.3)	52.3 (11.3)
Mean daily minimum °F (°C)	26.4 (−3.1)	27.3 (−2.6)	32.4 (0.2)	40.4 (4.7)	48.9 (9.4)	59.5 (15.3)	65.5 (18.6)	65.5 (18.6)	59.4 (15.2)	50.3 (10.2)	41.4 (5.2)	32.3 (0.2)	45.8 (7.7)
Average precipitation inches (mm)	2.87 (73)	3.38 (86)	4.75 (121)	3.45 (88)	2.21 (56)	3.80 (97)	3.81 (97)	3.92 (100)	3.93 (100)	3.66 (93)	4.22 (107)	3.58 (91)	43.58 (1,109)
Source: NOAA

=== Adjacent counties ===
Suffolk County has maritime boundaries with five other U.S. counties and is connected by land only to Nassau County.

- Nassau County—west
- Fairfield County, Connecticut—northwest
- New Haven County, Connecticut—north
- Middlesex County, Connecticut—north
- New London County, Connecticut—north
- Washington County, Rhode Island—northeast

=== National protected areas ===
- Amagansett National Wildlife Refuge
- Conscience Point National Wildlife Refuge
- Elizabeth A. Morton National Wildlife Refuge
- Fire Island National Seashore
- Sayville National Wildlife Refuge
- Seatuck National Wildlife Refuge
- Target Rock National Wildlife Refuge
- Wertheim National Wildlife Refuge
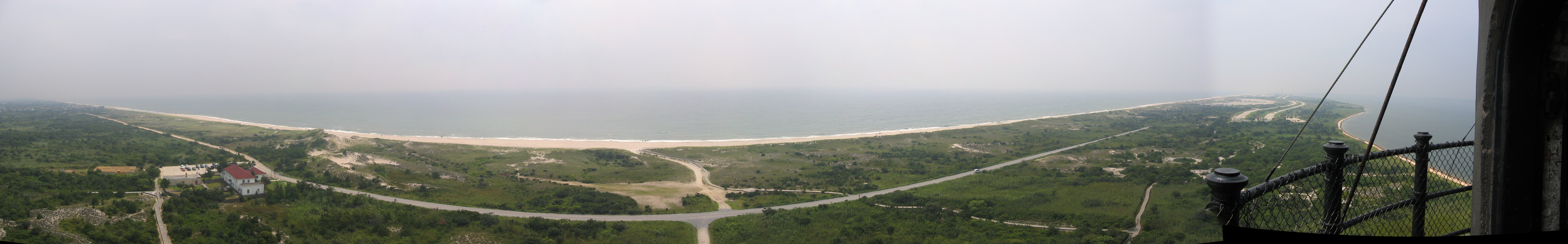
Western Fire Island from Fire Island Lighthouse

== Demographics ==
Historical population
Census	Pop.	Note	%±
1790	16,400		—
1800	19,735		20.3%
1810	21,113		7.0%
1820	23,936		13.4%
1830	26,780		11.9%
1840	32,469		21.2%
1850	36,922		13.7%
1860	43,275		17.2%
1870	46,924		8.4%
1880	52,888		12.7%
1890	62,491		18.2%
1900	77,582		24.1%
1910	96,138		23.9%
1920	110,246		14.7%
1930	161,055		46.1%
1940	197,355		22.5%
1950	276,129		39.9%
1960	666,784		141.5%
1970	1,124,950		68.7%
1980	1,284,231		14.2%
1990	1,321,864		2.9%
2000	1,419,369		7.4%
2010	1,493,350		5.2%
2020	1,525,920		2.2%
2025 (est.)	1,546,090	▲	1.3%
U.S. Decennial Census; 1790–1960 1900–1990 1990–2000; 2010, 2020, and 2025

=== Race and ethnicity ===
Suffolk County, New York – Racial and ethnic composition Note: the US Census treats Hispanic/Latino as an ethnic category. This table excludes Latinos from the racial categories and assigns them to a separate category. Hispanics/Latinos may be of any race.
Race / Ethnicity (NH = Non-Hispanic)	Pop 1980	Pop 1990	Pop 2000	Pop 2010	Pop 2020	% 1980	% 1990	% 2000	% 2010	% 2020
White alone (NH)	1,141,000	1,130,694	1,118,405	1,068,728	967,330	88.85%	85.54%	78.80%	71.57%	63.39%
Black or African American alone (NH)	69,558	77,303	93,262	102,117	107,268	5.42%	5.85%	6.57%	6.84%	7.03%
Native American or Alaska Native alone (NH)	1,966	2,592	2,981	2,906	3,102	0.15%	0.20%	0.21%	0.19%	0.20%
Asian alone (NH)	10,297	22,415	34,355	50,295	65,019	0.80%	1.70%	2.42%	3.37%	4.26%
Native Hawaiian or Pacific Islander alone (NH)	x	x	260	275	241	x	x	0.02%	0.02%	0.02%
Other race alone (NH)	2,721	1,008	2,217	3,041	9,479	0.21%	0.08%	0.16%	0.20%	0.62%
Mixed race or Multiracial (NH)	x	x	18,478	19,749	40,522	x	x	1.30%	1.32%	2.66%
Hispanic or Latino (any race)	58,689	87,852	149,411	246,239	332,959	4.57%	6.65%	10.53%	16.49%	21.82%
Total	1,284,231	1,321,864	1,419,369	1,493,350	1,525,920	100.00%	100.00%	100.00%	100.00%	100.00%

=== 2010 census ===
According to the 2010 U.S. census there were 1,493,350 people and 569,985 households residing in the county. The census estimated Suffolk County's population decreased slightly to 1,481,093 in 2018, representing 7.5% of the census-estimated New York State population of 19,745,289 and 19.0% of the census-estimated Long Island population of 7,869,820. The population density in 2010 was 1,637 people per square mile (632 people/km^{2}), with 569,985 households at an average density of 625 per square mile (241/km^{2}). However, by 2012, with an estimated total population increasing moderately to 1,499,273 there were 569,359 housing units. As of 2006, Suffolk County was the 21st-most populous county in the United States.

By 2014, the county's racial makeup was estimated at 85.2% White, 8.3% African American, 0.6% Native American, 4.0% Asian, 0.1% Pacific Islander, and 1.8% from two or more races. Those identifying as Hispanic or Latino, of any race, were 18.2% of the population. Those who identified as "white alone", not being of Hispanic or Latino origin, represented 69.3% of the population. In 2006, the county's racial or ethnic makeup was 83.6% White (75.4% White Non-Hispanic). African Americans were 7.4% of the population. Asians stood at 3.4% of the population. 5.4% were of other or mixed race. Latinos were 13.0% of the population. In 2007, Suffolk County's most common ethnicities were Italian (29.5%), Irish (24.0%), and German (17.6%).

In 2002, The New York Times cited a study by the non-profit group ERASE Racism, which determined Suffolk and its neighboring county, Nassau, to be the most racially segregated suburbs in the United States.

In 2006, there were 469,299 households, of which 37.00% had children under the age of 18 living with them, 62.00% were married couples living together, 10.80% had a female householder with no husband present, and 23.20% were non-families. 18.30% of all households were made up of individuals, and 7.80% had someone living alone who was 65 years of age or older. The average household size was 2.96 and the average family size was 3.36.

In the county, the population was spread out, with 26.10% under the age of 18, 7.60% from 18 to 24, 31.20% from 25 to 44, 23.30% from 45 to 64, and 11.80% who were 65 years of age or older. The median age was 36 years. For every 100 females, there were 95.90 males. For every 100 females age 18 and over, there were 92.80 males.

In 2008, Forbes magazine released its American Community Survey and named Suffolk County number 4 in its list of the top 25 richest counties in America. In 2016, according to Business Insider, the 11962 zip code encompassing Sagaponack, within Southampton, was listed as the most expensive in the U.S., with a median home sale price of $8.5 million.

The median income for a household in the county was $84,767, and the median income for a family was $72,112. Males had a median income of $50,046 versus $33,281 for females. The per capita income for the county was $26,577. Using a weighted average from 2009 to 2014 about 6.40% of the population were below the poverty line. In earlier censuses, the population below the poverty line included 2.70% of those under age 18 and 2.30% of those age 65 or over.

Racial groups, ethnicity, and religious groups on Long Island compared to state and nation
Place	Population 2010 census	% white	% black or African American	% Asian	% Other	% mixed race	% Hispanic/ Latino of any race	% Catholic	% not affiliated	% Jewish	% Protestant	Estimate of % not reporting
		Race					Ethnicity	Religious groups				
Nassau County	1,339,532	73.0	11.1	7.6	5.9	2.4	14.6	52	9	17	7	15
Suffolk County	1,493,350	80.8	7.4	3.4	5.9	2.4	16.5	52	21	7	8	11
Long Island Total (including Brooklyn and Queens)	7,568,304	54.7	20.4	12.3	9.3	3.2	20.5	40	18	15	7	20
NY State	19,378,102	65.7	15.9	7.3	8.0	3.0	17.6	42	20	9	10	16
USA	308,745,538	72.4	12.6	4.8	7.3	2.9	16.3	22	37	2	23	12
Source for Race and Ethnicity: 2010 Census; American Indian, Native Alaskan, Native Hawaiian, and Pacific Islander make up just 0.5% of the population of Long Island, and have been included with "Other".
Source for religious groups: ARDA2000

== Law and government ==
United States presidential election results for Suffolk County, New York
Year	Republican		Democratic		Third party(ies)	
Year	No.	%	No.	%	No.	%
1884	5,876	45.85%	6,429	50.17%	510	3.98%
1888	7,167	50.23%	6,600	46.26%	500	3.50%
1892	7,001	49.29%	6,274	44.17%	928	6.53%
1896	9,388	66.60%	3,872	27.47%	837	5.94%
1900	9,584	60.24%	5,711	35.90%	615	3.87%
1904	9,937	57.19%	6,795	39.11%	642	3.70%
1908	10,689	60.29%	5,877	33.15%	1,164	6.57%
1912	5,595	28.47%	7,878	40.08%	6,182	31.45%
1916	12,742	59.20%	8,422	39.13%	358	1.66%
1920	26,737	73.10%	8,852	24.20%	985	2.69%
1924	31,456	69.20%	10,024	22.05%	3,975	8.74%
1928	41,199	65.07%	19,497	30.79%	2,619	4.14%
1932	40,247	55.49%	30,799	42.46%	1,482	2.04%
1936	48,970	58.07%	33,078	39.22%	2,287	2.71%
1940	63,712	65.12%	33,853	34.60%	270	0.28%
1944	65,650	67.59%	31,231	32.15%	253	0.26%
1948	75,519	69.75%	29,104	26.88%	3,642	3.36%
1952	115,570	74.58%	39,120	25.25%	262	0.17%
1956	167,805	77.64%	48,323	22.36%	0	0.00%
1960	166,644	59.32%	114,033	40.59%	268	0.10%
1964	144,350	44.37%	180,598	55.51%	385	0.12%
1968	218,027	58.18%	122,590	32.71%	34,150	9.11%
1972	316,452	70.34%	132,441	29.44%	1,005	0.22%
1976	248,908	54.10%	208,263	45.27%	2,877	0.63%
1980	256,294	57.00%	149,945	33.35%	43,416	9.66%
1984	335,485	66.03%	171,295	33.72%	1,276	0.25%
1988	311,242	60.51%	199,215	38.73%	3,893	0.76%
1992	229,467	40.40%	220,811	38.88%	117,677	20.72%
1996	182,510	36.13%	261,828	51.83%	60,875	12.05%
2000	240,992	41.99%	306,306	53.37%	26,646	4.64%
2004	309,949	48.53%	315,909	49.46%	12,854	2.01%
2008	307,021	46.53%	346,549	52.53%	6,209	0.94%
2012	282,131	47.48%	304,079	51.17%	8,056	1.36%
2016	350,570	51.46%	303,951	44.62%	26,733	3.92%
2020	381,253	49.30%	381,021	49.27%	11,013	1.42%
2024	417,549	54.51%	341,812	44.63%	6,586	0.86%

Active Voter Registration and Party Enrollment as of February 20, 2026
Party	Number of voters	Percentage
Democratic	371,050	32.74%
Republican	356,218	31.43%
Unaffiliated	350,168	30.90%
Conservative	21,675	1.91%
Working Families	4,415	0.39%
Other	29,680	2.62%
Total	1,133,206	100%

County officials
Position	Name	Party	Term
Sheriff	Errol D. Toulon Jr.	Dem	2018–present
District Attorney	Raymond A. Tierney	Rep	2022–present
County Clerk	Vincent A. Puleo	Rep	2023–present
Comptroller	John M. Kennedy Jr.	Rep	2015–present

=== State Senate Officials for Suffolk County ===
District	Senator	Party
1	Anthony Palumbo	Republican
2	Mario Mattera	Republican
3	L. Dean Murray	Republican
4	Monica Martinez	Democratic
8	Alexis Weik	Republican

=== State Assembly Officials for Suffolk County ===
District	Representative	Party
1	T. John Schiavoni	Democratic
2	Jodi Giglio	Republican
3	Joe DeStefano	Republican
4	Rebecca Kassay	Democratic
5	Douglas M. Smith	Republican
6	Philip Ramos	Democratic
7	Jarett Gandolfo	Republican
8	Michael Fitzpatrick	Republican
9	Michael Durso	Republican
10	Steven H. Stern	Democratic
11	Kwani O'Pharrow	Democratic
12	Keith Brown	Republican

=== United States House of Representatives Officials for Suffolk County ===
District	Representative	Party
1	Nick LaLota	Republican
2	Andrew Garbarino	Republican

=== United States Senate ===
Senator	Party
Chuck Schumer	Democratic
Kirsten Gillibrand	Democratic

In 2003, Democrat Steve Levy was elected county executive, ending longtime Republican control. In 2001, Democrat Thomas Spota was elected District Attorney, and ran unopposed in 2005. Although Suffolk voters gave George H. W. Bush a victory here in 1992, the county voted for Bill Clinton in 1996 and continued the trend by giving Al Gore an 11-percent victory in the county in 2000. 2004 Democratic candidate John Kerry won by a much smaller margin of under one percent, in 2008 Democratic candidate Barack Obama won by a slightly larger 6 percent margin, 52.5%-46.5%. In 2012, he carried the county by a slightly smaller margin 51%-47%. In 2016, Republican candidate Donald Trump won Suffolk County by a 6.9 percent margin, becoming the first Republican to carry the county since 1992. In 2020, Trump again won Suffolk County; this time, however, it was decided by just 232 votes out of nearly 800,000 votes cast, making it the closest county in the nation in terms of percentage margin, and representing nearly a seven-point swing towards the Democratic ticket of former Vice President Joe Biden and junior California senator Kamala Harris. In percentage terms, it was the closest county in the state, although Ontario County and Warren County had narrower raw vote margins of just 33 and 57 votes, respectively. Suffolk was one of five counties in the state that Trump won by less than 500 votes. With Tarrant County, Texas and Maricopa County, Arizona flipping Democratic in 2020, Suffolk County was the most populous county in the nation to vote for Trump in 2020. In 2024, Trump won 54% of the vote in Suffolk county, the highest percentage since 1988.

As a whole, both Suffolk and Nassau counties are considered swing counties. However, until 2016, they tended not to receive significant attention from presidential candidates, as the state of New York has turned reliably Democratic at the national level. In 2008 and 2012, Hofstra University in Nassau County hosted a presidential debate. Hofstra hosted the first debate of the 2016 presidential election season, on September 26, 2016, making Hofstra the first college or university in the United States to host a presidential debate in three consecutive elections. The presence on the 2016 ticket of Westchester County resident Hillary Clinton and Manhattan resident Donald Trump resulted in greater attention by the candidates to the concerns of Long Island. Trump visited Long Island voters and donors at least four times while Clinton made one stop for voters and one additional stop in the Hamptons for donors.

After the 2022 midterm election results were counted, Suffolk appears to have moved further to the right. Republican gubernatorial candidate and Suffolk County native Lee Zeldin won the county by more than 17 points over the Democratic candidate Kathy Hochul. Republicans, as of 2024, hold both congressional districts covering that being New York's 1st congressional district represented by Nick LaLota and New York's 2nd congressional district represented by Andrew Garbarino.

The 2023 election saw this trend continue, with Republican Edward P. Romaine defeating Democrat David Calone by 14 points to become the next County Executive. Republicans also gained a 12-6 supermajority in the County Legislature, seeing a net gain of one seat.

=== Suffolk County Executives ===
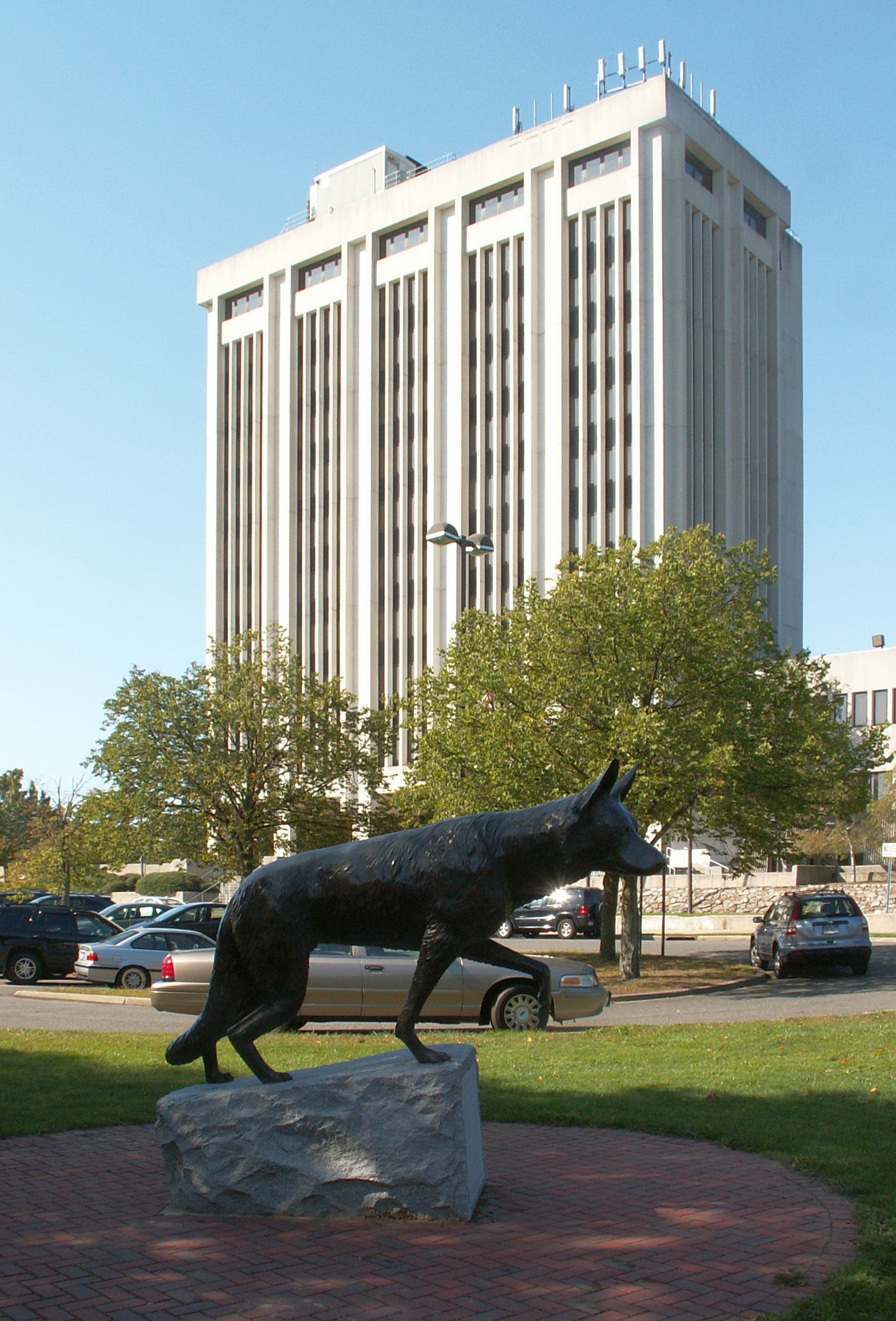
H. Lee Dennison County Executive Building in Hauppauge

Suffolk County Executives
Name	Party	Term
H. Lee Dennison	Democratic	1960–1972
John V.N. Klein	Republican	1972–1979
Peter F. Cohalan	Republican	1980–1986
Michael A. LoGrande*	Republican	1986–1987
Patrick G. Halpin	Democratic	1988–1991
Robert J. Gaffney	Republican	1992–2003
Steve Levy**	Democratic	2004–2010
Steve Levy**	Republican	2010–2011
Steve Bellone	Democratic	2012–2023
Edward P. Romaine	Republican	2024–present

* Appointed to complete Cohalan's term.

** Levy was originally elected as a Democrat, but became a Republican in 2010.

=== Suffolk County Legislature ===
The county has 18 legislative districts, each represented by a legislator. As of 2026, there are 9 Republicans, 7 Democrats, and 2 Conservatives.

==== Historical composition of the Suffolk County Legislature ====
Year	1	2	3	4	5	6	7	8	9	10	11	12	13	14	15	16	17	18	Partisan Breakdown
2026	Greg Doroski (D)	Ann Welker (D)	James Mazzarella (DPO)(R)	Nicholas Caracappa (MajL) (C)	Steven Englebright (D)	Chad Lennon (C)	Dominick Thorne (R)	Anthony Piccirillo (PO)(R)	Samuel Gonzalez (D)	Trish Bergin (R)	Steven J. Flotteron (R)	Leslie Kennedy (R)	Salvatore Formica (R)	Richard J. Renna (R)	Jason Richberg (MinL) (D)	Rebecca Sanin (D)	Tom Donnelly (D)	Stephanie Bontempi (R)	11–7 Republican
2025	Catherine Stark (R)	Ann Welker (D)	James Mazzarella (R)	Nicholas Caracappa (MajL) (C)	Steven Englebright (D)	Chad Lennon (C)	Dominick Thorne (R)	Anthony Piccirillo (R)	Samuel Gonzalez (D)	Trish Bergin (R)	Steven J. Flotteron (DPO) (R)	Leslie Kennedy (R)	Robert Trotta (R)	Kevin J. McCaffrey (PO)(R)	Jason Richberg (MinL) (D)	Rebecca Sanin (D)	Tom Donnelly (D)	Stephanie Bontempi (R)	12–6 Republican
2024	Catherine Stark (R)	Ann Welker (D)	James Mazzarella (R)	Nicholas Caracappa (MajL) (C)	Steven Englebright (D)	Chad Lennon (C)	Dominick Thorne (R)	Anthony Piccirillo (R)	Samuel Gonzalez (D)	Trish Bergin (R)	Steven J. Flotteron (DPO) (R)	Leslie Kennedy (R)	Robert Trotta (R)	Kevin J. McCaffrey (PO)(R)	Jason Richberg (MinL) (D)	Rebecca Sanin (D)	Tom Donnelly (D)	Stephanie Bontempi (R)	12–6 Republican
2023	Al Krupski (D)	Bridget Fleming (D)	James Mazzarella (R)	Nicholas Caracappa (MajL) (C)	Kara Hahn (D)	Sarah Anker (D)	Dominick Thorne (R)	Anthony Piccirillo (R)	Samuel Gonzalez (D)	Trish Bergin (R)	Steven J. Flotteron (DPO) (R)	Leslie Kennedy (R)	Robert Trotta (R)	Kevin J. McCaffrey (PO)(R)	Jason Richberg (MinL) (D)	Manuel Esteban (R)	Tom Donnelly (D)	Stephanie Bontempi (R)	11–7 Republican
2022	Al Krupski (D)	Bridget Fleming (D)	James Mazzarella (R)	Nicholas Caracappa (MajL) (C)	Kara Hahn (D)	Sarah Anker (D)	Dominick Thorne (R)	Anthony Piccirillo (R)	Samuel Gonzalez (D)	Trish Bergin (R)	Steven J. Flotteron (DPO) (R)	Leslie Kennedy (R)	Robert Trotta (R)	Kevin J. McCaffrey (PO)(R)	Jason Richberg (MinL) (D)	Manuel Esteban (R)	Tom Donnelly (D)	Stephanie Bontempi (R)	11–7 Republican
2021	Al Krupski (D)	Bridget Fleming (D)	James Mazzarella (R)	Nicholas Caracappa (C)	Kara Hahn (DPO) (D)	Sarah Anker (D)	Robert Calarco (PO) (D)	Anthony Piccirillo (R)	Samuel Gonzalez (D)	Tom Cilmi (R)	Steven J. Flotteron (R)	Leslie Kennedy (R)	Robert Trotta (R)	Kevin J. McCaffrey (MinL)(R)	Jason Richberg (D)	Susan A. Berland (MajL)(D)	Tom Donnelly (D)	William R. Spencer (D)	10-8 Democratic
2020	Al Krupski (D)	Bridget Fleming (D)	Rudy Sunderman (R)	Thomas Muratore (R)	Kara Hahn (DPO) (D)	Sarah Anker (D)	Robert Calarco (PO) (D)	Anthony Piccirillo (R)	Samuel Gonzalez (D)	Tom Cilmi (MinL) (R)	Steven J. Flotteron (R)	Leslie Kennedy (R)	Robert Trotta (R)	Kevin J. McCaffrey (R)	Jason Richberg (D)	Susan A. Berland (MajL)(D)	Tom Donnelly (D)	William R. Spencer (D)	10-8 Democratic
2019	Al Krupski (D)	Bridget Fleming (D)	Rudy Sunderman (R)	Thomas Muratore (R)	Kara Hahn (MajL)(D)	Sarah Anker (D)	Robert Calarco (DPO) (D)	William J. Lindsay III (D)	Samuel Gonzalez (D)	Tom Cilmi (R)	Steven J. Flotteron (R)	Leslie Kennedy (R)	Robert Trotta (R)	Kevin J. McCaffrey (MinL) (R)	DuWayne Gregory(PO) (D)	Susan A. Berland (MajL)(D)	Tom Donnelly (D)	William R. Spencer (D)	11-7 Democratic
2018	Al Krupski (D)	Bridget Fleming (D)	Rudy Sunderman (R)	Thomas Muratore (R)	Kara Hahn (MajL)(D)	Sarah Anker (D)	Robert Calarco (DPO) (D)	William J. Lindsay III (D)	Monica R. Martinez (D)	Tom Cilmi (R)	Steven J. Flotteron (R)	Leslie Kennedy (R)	Robert Trotta (R)	Kevin J. McCaffrey (MinL) (R)	DuWayne Gregory (PO) (D)	Susan A. Berland (MajL) (D)	Tom Donnelly (D)	William R. Spencer (D)	11–7 Democratic
2017	Al Krupski (D)	Bridget Fleming (D)	Kate M. Browning (WF)	Thomas Muratore (R)	Kara Hahn (MajL)(D)	Sarah Anker (D)	Robert Calarco (DPO) (D)	William J. Lindsay III (D)	Monica R. Martinez (D)	Tom Cilmi (R)	Thomas F. Barraga (R)	Leslie Kennedy (R)	Robert Trotta (R)	Kevin J. McCaffrey (MinL) (R)	DuWayne Gregory (PO) (D)	Steven H. Stern (D)	Louis D'Amaro (D)	William R. Spencer (D)	12–6 Democratic
2016	Al Krupski (D)	Bridget Fleming (D)	Kate M. Browning (WF)	Thomas Muratore (R)	Kara Hahn (MajL)(D)	Sarah Anker (D)	Robert Calarco (DPO) (D)	William J. Lindsay III (D)	Monica R. Martinez (D)	Tom Cilmi (R)	Thomas F. Barraga (R)	Leslie Kennedy (R)	Robert Trotta (R)	Kevin J. McCaffrey (MinL) (R)	DuWayne Gregory (PO) (D)	Steven H. Stern (D)	Louis D'Amaro (D)	William R. Spencer (D)	12–6 Democratic
2015	Al Krupski (D)	Jay Schneiderman (DPO) (I)	Kate M. Browning (WF)	Thomas Muratore (R)	Kara Hahn (MajL)(D)	Sarah Anker (D)	Robert Calarco (DPO) (D)	William J. Lindsay III (D)	Monica R. Martinez (D)	Tom Cilmi (R)	Thomas F. Barraga (R)	Leslie Kennedy (R)	Robert Trotta (R)	Kevin J. McCaffrey (MinL) (R)	DuWayne Gregory (PO) (D)	Steven H. Stern (D)	Louis D'Amaro (D)	William R. Spencer (D)	12–6 Democratic
2014	Al Krupski (D)	Jay Schneiderman (DPO) (I)	Kate M. Browning (WF)	Thomas Muratore (R)	Kara Hahn (MajL)(D)	Sarah Anker (D)	Robert Calarco (DPO) (D)	William J. Lindsay III (D)	Monica R. Martinez (D)	Tom Cilmi (R)	Thomas F. Barraga (R)	John M. Kennedy, Jr. (MinL) (R)	Robert Trotta (R)	Kevin J. McCaffrey (MinL) (R)	DuWayne Gregory (PO) (D)	Steven H. Stern (D)	Louis D'Amaro (D)	William R. Spencer (D)	12–6 Democratic
2013	Al Krupski (D)	Jay Schneiderman (DPO) (I)	Kate M. Browning (WF)	Thomas Muratore (R)	Kara Hahn (D)	Sarah Anker (D)	Robert Calarco (MajL) (D)	William J. Lindsay III (D)	Ricardo Montano (D)	Tom Cilmi (R)	Thomas F. Barraga (R)	John M. Kennedy, Jr. (MinL) (R)	Lynne C. Nowick (R)	Wayne R. Horsley (PO) (D)	DuWayne Gregory (D)	Steven H. Stern (D)	Louis D'Amaro (D)	William R. Spencer (D)	13–5 Democratic
2012	Edward P. Romaine (R)	Jay Schneiderman (I)	Kate M. Browning (WF)	Thomas Muratore (R)	Vivian Viloria-Fisher (D)	Sarah Anker (D)	Robert Calarco (D)	William J. Lindsay(PO) (D)	Ricardo Montano (D)	Tom Cilmi (R)	Thomas F. Barraga (R)	John M. Kennedy, Jr. (MinL) (R)	Lynne C. Nowick (R)	Wayne R. Horsley (DPO) (D)	DuWayne Gregory (D)	Steven H. Stern (D)	Louis D'Amaro (D)	William R. Spencer (D)	12–6 Democratic
2011	Edward P. Romaine (R)	Jay Schneiderman (I)	Kate M. Browning (WF)	Thomas Muratore (R)	Vivian Viloria-Fisher (D)	Sarah Anker (D)	Jack Eddington (I)	William J. Lindsay (PO) (D)	Ricardo Montano (D)	Tom Cilmi (R)	Thomas F. Barraga (R)	John M. Kennedy, Jr. (MinL) (R)	Lynne C. Nowick (R)	Wayne R. Horsley (DPO) (D)	DuWayne Gregory (D)	Steven H. Stern (D)	Louis D'Amaro (D)	Jon Cooper (D)	12–6 Democratic
2010	Edward P. Romaine (R)	Jay Schneiderman (I)	Kate M. Browning (WF)	Thomas Muratore (R)	Vivian Viloria-Fisher (D)	Daniel P. Losquadro (MinL) (R)	Jack Eddington (I)	William J. Lindsay (PO) (D)	Ricardo Montano (D)	Tom Cilmi (R)	Thomas F. Barraga (R)	John M. Kennedy, Jr. (R)	Lynne C. Nowick (R)	Wayne R. Horsley (DPO) (D)	DuWayne Gregory (D)	Steven H. Stern (D)	Louis D'Amaro (D)	Jon Cooper (D)	11–7 Democratic
2009	Edward P. Romaine (R)	Jay Schneiderman (I)	Kate M. Browning (WF)	Brian Beedenbender (D)	Vivian Viloria-Fisher (D)	Daniel P. Losquadro (MinL) (R)	Jack Eddington (I)	William J. Lindsay (PO) (D)	Ricardo Montano (D)	Cameron Alden (R)	Thomas F. Barraga (R)	John M. Kennedy, Jr. (R)	Lynne C. Nowick (R)	Wayne R. Horsley (DPO) (D)	DuWayne Gregory (D)	Steven H. Stern (D)	Louis D'Amaro (D)	Jon Cooper (D)	12-6 Democratic
2008	Edward P. Romaine (R)	Jay Schneiderman (I)	Kate M. Browning (WF)	Brian Beedenbender (D)	Vivian Viloria-Fisher (D)	Daniel P. Losquadro (MinL) (R)	Jack Eddington (I)	William J. Lindsay (PO) (D)	Ricardo Montano (D)	Cameron Alden (R)	Thomas F. Barraga (R)	John M. Kennedy, Jr. (R)	Lynne C. Nowick (R)	Wayne R. Horsley (DPO) (D)	DuWayne Gregory (D)	Steven H. Stern (D)	Louis D'Amaro (D)	Jon Cooper (D)	12–6 Democratic
2007	Edward P. Romaine (R)	Jay Schneiderman (R)	Kate M. Browning (WF)	Joseph T. Caracappa (R)	Vivian Viloria-Fisher (D)	Daniel P. Losquadro (MinL) (R)	Jack Eddington (I)	William J. Lindsay (PO) (D)	Ricardo Montano (D)	Cameron Alden (R)	Thomas F. Barraga (R)	John M. Kennedy, Jr. (R)	Lynne C. Nowick (R)	Wayne R. Horsley (DPO) (D)	Elie Mystal (D)	Steven H. Stern (D)	Louis D'Amaro (D)	Jon Cooper (D)	10–8 Democratic
2006	Edward P. Romaine (R)	Jay Schneiderman (R)	Kate M. Browning (WF)	Joseph T. Caracappa (R)	Vivian Viloria-Fisher (D)	Daniel P. Losquadro (MinL) (R)	Jack Eddington (I)	William J. Lindsay (PO) (D)	Ricardo Montano (D)	Cameron Alden (R)	Thomas F. Barraga (R)	John M. Kennedy, Jr. (R)	Lynne C. Nowick (R)	Wayne R. Horsley (DPO) (D)	Elie Mystal (D)	Steven H. Stern (D)	Louis D'Amaro (D)	Jon Cooper (D)	10–8 Democratic
2005	Michael J. Caracciolo (R)	Jay Schneiderman (R)	Peter O'Leary (MajL) (R)	Joseph T. Caracappa (PO) (R)	Vivian Viloria-Fisher (D)	Daniel P. Losquadro (R)	Brian X. Foley (D)	William J. Lindsay (MinL) (D)	Ricardo Montano (D)	Cameron Alden (R)	Angie Carpenter (R)	John M. Kennedy, Jr. (R)	Lynne C. Nowick (R)	David Bishop (D)	Elie Mystal (D)	Allan Binder (R)	Paul J. Tonna (R)	Jon Cooper (D)	11–7 Republican

Republicans controlled the county legislature until a landmark election in November 2005 where three Republican seats switched to the Democrats, giving them control. In November 2007, the Democratic Party once again retained control over the Suffolk County Legislature, picking up one seat in the process. In November 2009, the Republican Party regained the seat lost in 2007 but remained in the minority for the 2010–2011 session. In November 2011, the Democratic Party maintained control over the Suffolk County Legislature picking up one seat that had been held by an Independence Party member. In November 2013, the Republican Party gained the 14th district seat, but remained in the minority until 2021, when the GOP flipped the county legislature, picking up three seats with incumbents Robert Calarco (the sitting Presiding Officer) and Susan Berland (the sitting Majority Leader) losing their bids for re-election. The Suffolk GOP built on these gains in the 2023 general election, gaining a 12–6 supermajority.

=== Law enforcement ===
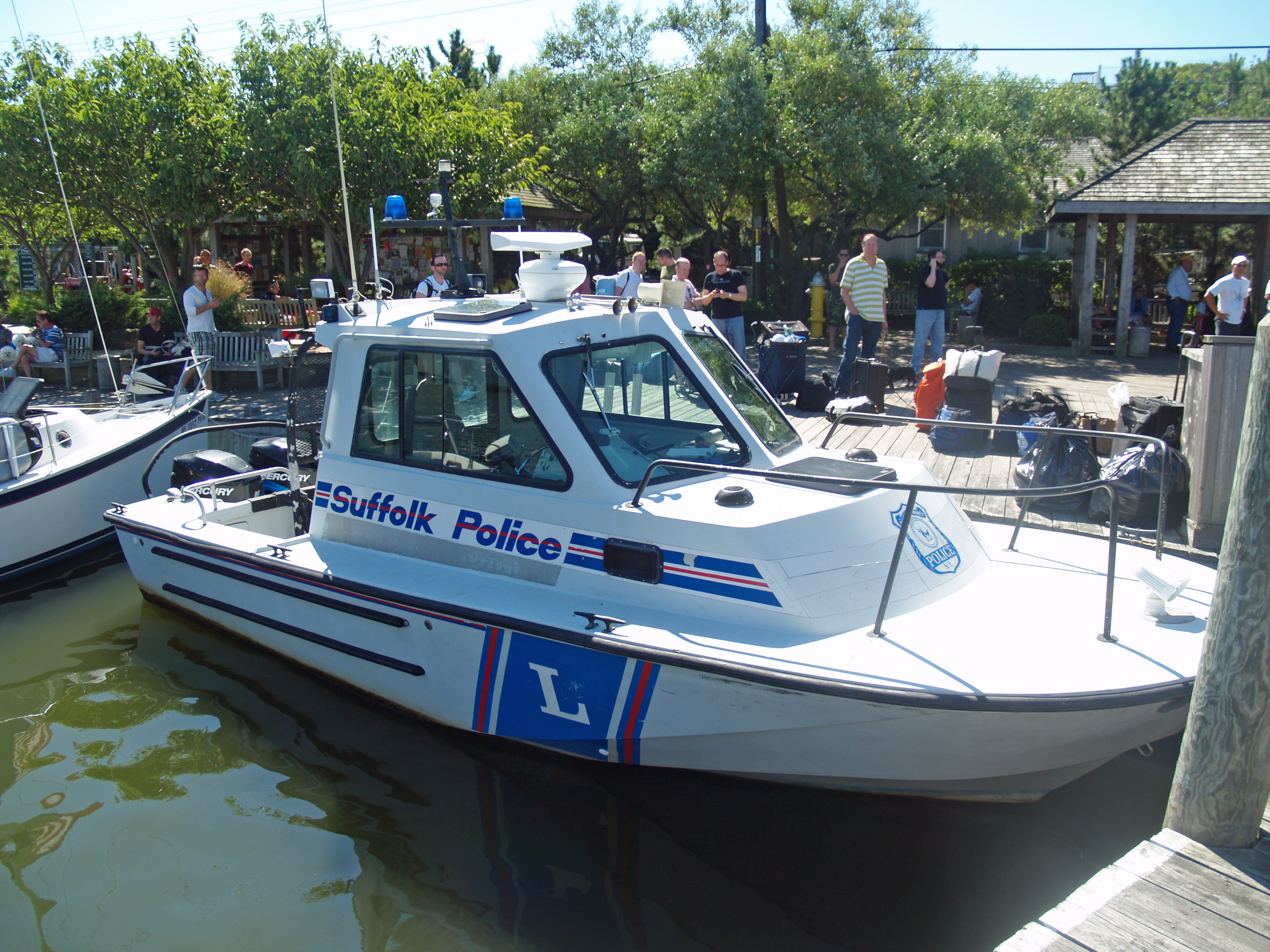
A Suffolk County police boat docked on Fire Island

Police services in the five western towns (Babylon, Huntington, Islip, Smithtown and Brookhaven) are provided primarily by the Suffolk County Police Department. The five "East End" towns (Riverhead, Southold, Shelter Island, East Hampton, and Southampton), maintain their own police and other law enforcement agencies. Also, there are a number of villages, such as Amityville, Asharoken, Lloyd Harbor, Northport, and Westhampton Beach that maintain their own police forces. In 1994, the Village of Greenport voted to abolish its police department and turn responsibility for law and order over to the Southold police department.

After the Long Island State Parkway Police was disbanded in 1980, all state parkways in Suffolk County became the responsibility of Troop L of the New York State Police, headquartered at Republic Airport. State parks, such as Robert Moses State Park, are the responsibility of the New York State Park Police, based at Belmont Lake State Park. In 1996, the Long Island Rail Road Police Department was consolidated into the Metropolitan Transportation Authority Police, which has jurisdiction over all rail lines in the county. Since the New York state legislature created the New York State University Police in 1999, they are in charge of all law enforcement services for State University of New York property and campuses. The State University Police have jurisdiction in Suffolk County at Stony Brook University and Farmingdale State College.

The Suffolk County Sheriff's Office is a separate agency. The sheriff, an elected official who serves a four-year term, operates the two Suffolk County correctional facilities (in Yaphank and Riverhead), provides county courthouse security and detention, service and enforcement of civil papers, evictions and warrants. The Sheriff's Office is also responsible for securing all county-owned property, such as county government office buildings, as well as the campuses of the Suffolk County Community College. As of 2008, the Suffolk County Sheriff's Office employed 275 Deputy Sheriffs, 850 corrections officers, and about 200 civilian staff.

Suffolk County has a long maritime history with several outer barrier beaches and hundreds of square miles of waterways. The Suffolk Police Marine Bureau patrols the 500 square miles (1,000 km^{2}) of navigable waterways within the police district, from the Connecticut and Rhode Island state line which bisects Long Island Sound to the New York state line 3 miles (5 km) south of Fire Island in the Atlantic Ocean. Some Suffolk County towns (Islip, Brookhaven, Southampton, East Hampton, Babylon, Huntington, Smithtown) also employ various bay constables and other local marine patrol, which are sworn armed peace officers with full arrest powers, providing back up to the Suffolk Police Marine Bureau as well as the United States Coast Guard.

This includes Fire Island and parts of Jones Island barrier beaches and the islands of the Great South Bay. Marine units also respond to water and ice rescues on the inland lakes, ponds, and streams of the District.

In February 2019, legislator Robert Trotta (R-Fort Salonga) put forward a resolution to recover salary and benefits from James Burke, the county's former police chief. Burke had pled guilty to beating a man while in police custody and attempting to conceal it, and the county had paid the victim $1.5 million in a settlement; it had also paid Burke more than $500,000 in benefits and salary while Burke was concealing his conduct. Trotta said that the faithless servant doctrine in New York common law gave him the power to claw back the compensation. The Suffolk County Legislature supported the suit unanimously. The following month Suffolk County Executive Steve Bellone signed the bill.

Also in February 2019, a court ruled against the Suffolk County jail in the case of a former inmate who was denied hormone replacement therapy by the jail's doctors. Documents introduced in the trial indicate 11 other inmates were also denied treatment.

=== Courts ===
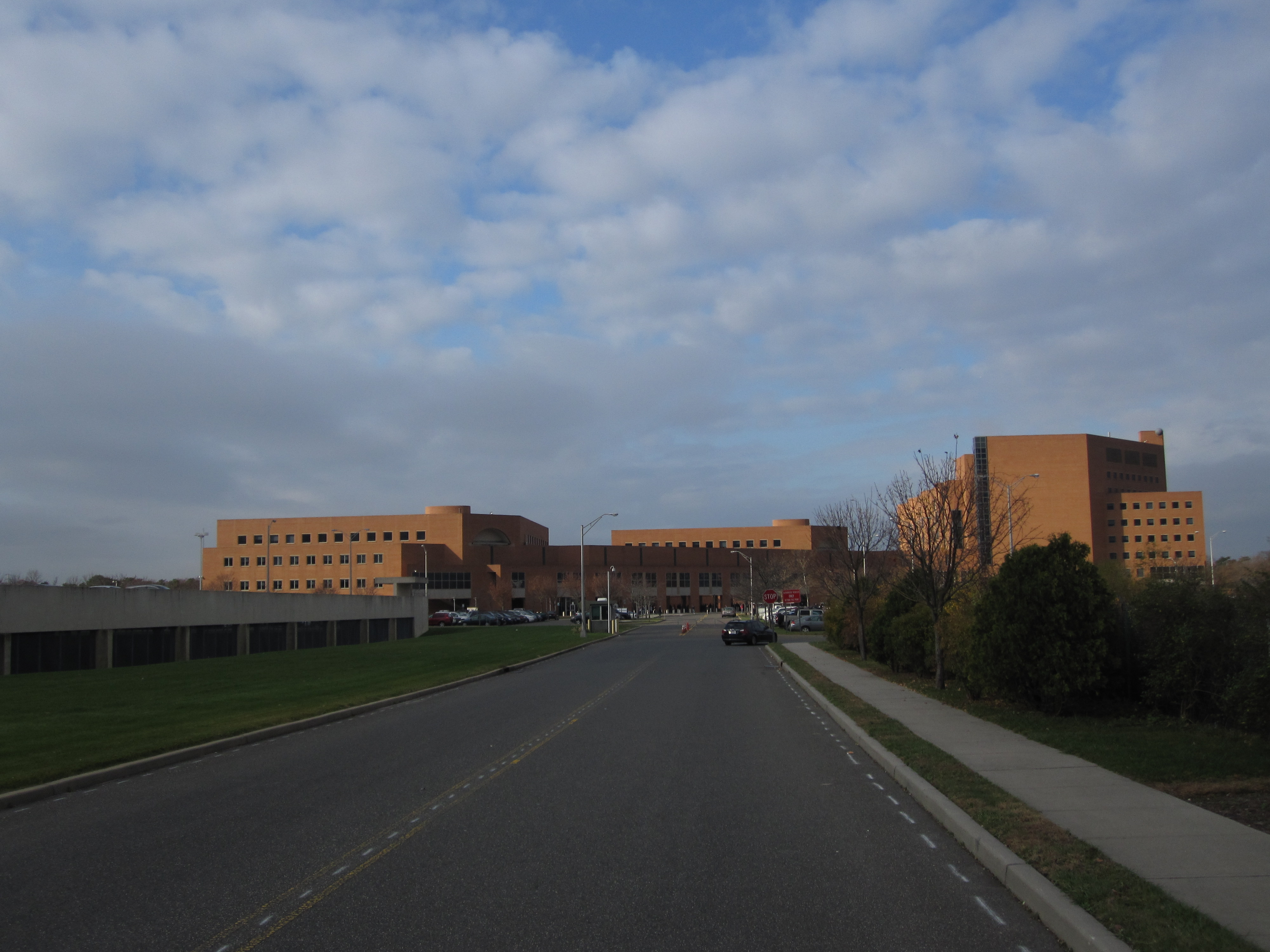
Cohalan Court Complex in Central Islip

Suffolk County is part of the 10th Judicial District of the New York State Unified Court System; is home to the Alfonse M. D'Amato Courthouse of the Federal U.S. District Court, Eastern District of New York; and has various local municipal courts. The State Courts are divided into Supreme Court, which has general jurisdiction over all cases, and lower courts that either hear claims of a limited dollar amount, or of a specific nature. Similarly, the local courts hear claims of a limited dollar amount, or hear specific types of cases. The Federal Court has jurisdiction over Federal Claims, State Law claims that are joined with Federal claims, and claims where there is a diversity of citizenship.

==== Supreme Court ====
- The Suffolk County Supreme Court is a trial court of unlimited general original jurisdiction (except as to matters which the federal courts have exclusive jurisdiction), but it generally only hears cases that are outside the subject-matter jurisdiction of other trial courts of more limited jurisdiction. The Suffolk County Clerk is the Clerk of the Court of the Supreme Court.
- The main courthouse for the Supreme Court is in Riverhead, which has been the court's home since 1729. The original courthouse was replaced in 1855, and that courthouse was expanded in 1881. The courthouse was damaged by fire and rebuilt in 1929. In 1994, a new court building was added to the complex. This Courthouse was dedicated as the "Alan D. Oshrin Supreme Court Building" on August 1, 2011.
- The Supreme Court also shares space in the Cohalan Court Complex in Central Islip with several other courts and county agencies. Matrimonial actions are heard in the Supreme Court, and those matters are generally heard in the Supreme Court section of the Cohalan Court Complex.

==== Other Superior Courts ====
- The Suffolk County Court is a trial court of limited jurisdiction. It has jurisdiction over all of Suffolk County, and is authorized to handle criminal prosecutions of both felonies and lesser offenses committed within the county, although in practice most minor offenses are handled by the local courts. It is the trial court for felonies, or where a person is indicted by a Grand Jury in Suffolk County. The County Court also has limited jurisdiction in civil cases, generally involving amounts up to $25,000. The County Court is in the Cromarty Court Complex Criminal Courts Building in Riverhead.
- The Suffolk County Surrogate's Court hears cases involving the affairs of decedents, including the probate of wills and the administration of estates, guardianships, and adoptions. The Surrogate's Court is in the County Center in Riverhead.
- The Suffolk County Family Court has jurisdiction over all of Suffolk County in petitions filed for Neglect & Abuse, Juvenile Delinquency/Designated Felonies, Persons in Need of Supervision, Adoption, Guardianship, Foster Care, Family Offense (Order of Protection), Custody & Visitation, Paternity, Support Matters (Child & Spousal), Consent to Marry. The court also has a Juvenile Drug Court and Family Treatment Court. Individuals, attorneys, and agencies may initiate a proceeding in the Family Court with the filing of a petition. The Suffolk County Family Court is in the Cohalan Court Complex in Central Islip and maintains a facility in Riverhead. Case assignment is dependent upon the geographical location of the parties.

==== Local courts ====
The District Court and the Town and Village Courts are the local courts of Suffolk County. There are more than 30 local courts, each with limited criminal and civil subject matter and geographic jurisdictions. The local criminal courts have trial jurisdiction over misdemeanors, violations and infractions; preliminary jurisdiction over felonies; and traffic tickets charging a crime. The local civil courts calendar small claims, evictions, and civil actions.

- Suffolk County District Court has geographic jurisdiction over the 5 western towns of Suffolk County (Babylon, Brookhaven, Huntington, Islip & Smithtown). The Criminal division of the Suffolk District Court is in the Cohalan Court Complex, Central Islip, and includes Domestic Violence Courts, Drug Court, and a Mental Health Court. The Civil division is divided up in the 5 "outlying" courthouses in Lindenhurst, Huntington Station, Hauppauge, Ronkonkoma, and Patchogue. Civil actions may be filed up to $15,000, and small claims actions up to $5000. Actions are commenced by filing with the court. Summary proceedings under the RPAPL are filed in the district where the property is located.
- The Town Courts of East Hampton, Riverhead, Shelter Island, Southampton, and Southold have geographic jurisdiction over the 5 eastern towns of Suffolk County. Each town maintains a courthouse where judges hear criminal cases (including a regional Drug Court) and civil actions. Civil actions are commenced by serving a summons and complaint for claims up to $3,000, and small claims actions are heard up to $3000. Summary proceedings under the RPAPL are filed in the town where the property is located.
- The Village Courts of Amityville, Asharoken, Babylon, Belle Terre, Bellport, Brightwaters, Head of the Harbor, Huntington Bay, Islandia, Lake Grove, Lindenhurst, Lloyd Harbor, Nissequogue, Northport, Ocean Beach, Old Field, Patchogue, Poquott, Port Jefferson, Quogue, Sag Harbor, Saltaire, Shoreham, Southampton, Village of the Branch, West Hampton Dunes, and Westhampton Beach have geographic jurisdiction within each incorporated village. Criminal and civil subject matter jurisdiction varies in each court.

Most non-criminal moving violation tickets issued in the five west towns are handled by the Traffic Violations Bureau, which is part of the New York State Department of Motor Vehicles, not the court system.

== Education ==
=== Colleges and universities ===
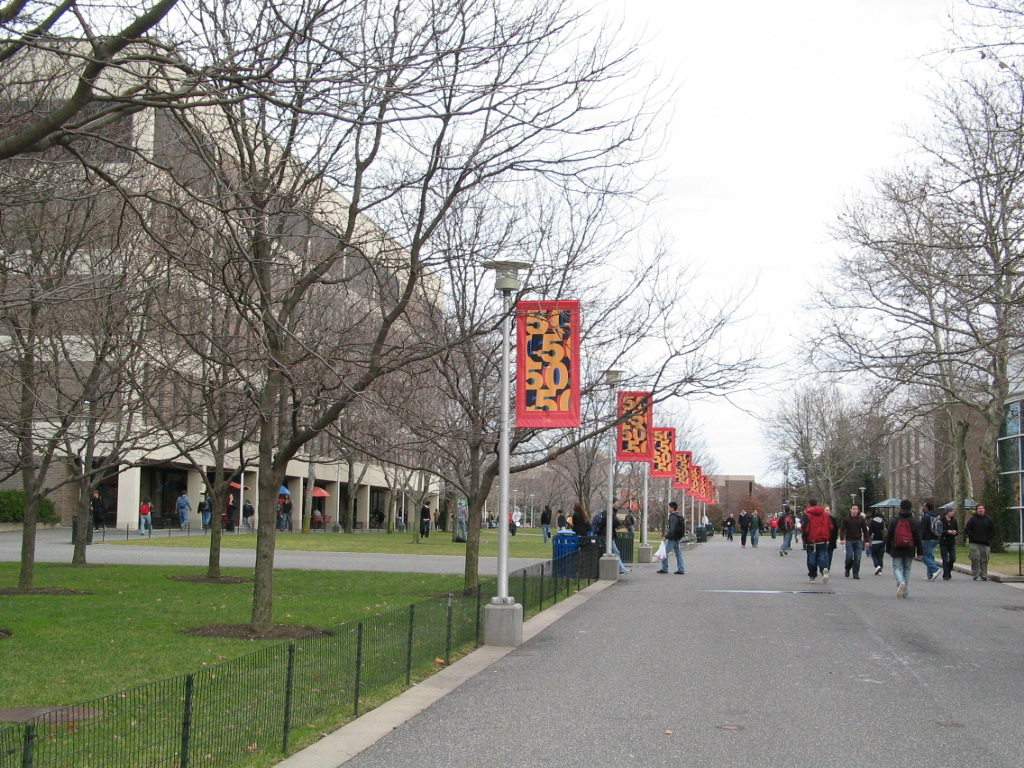
Stony Brook University in Stony Brook

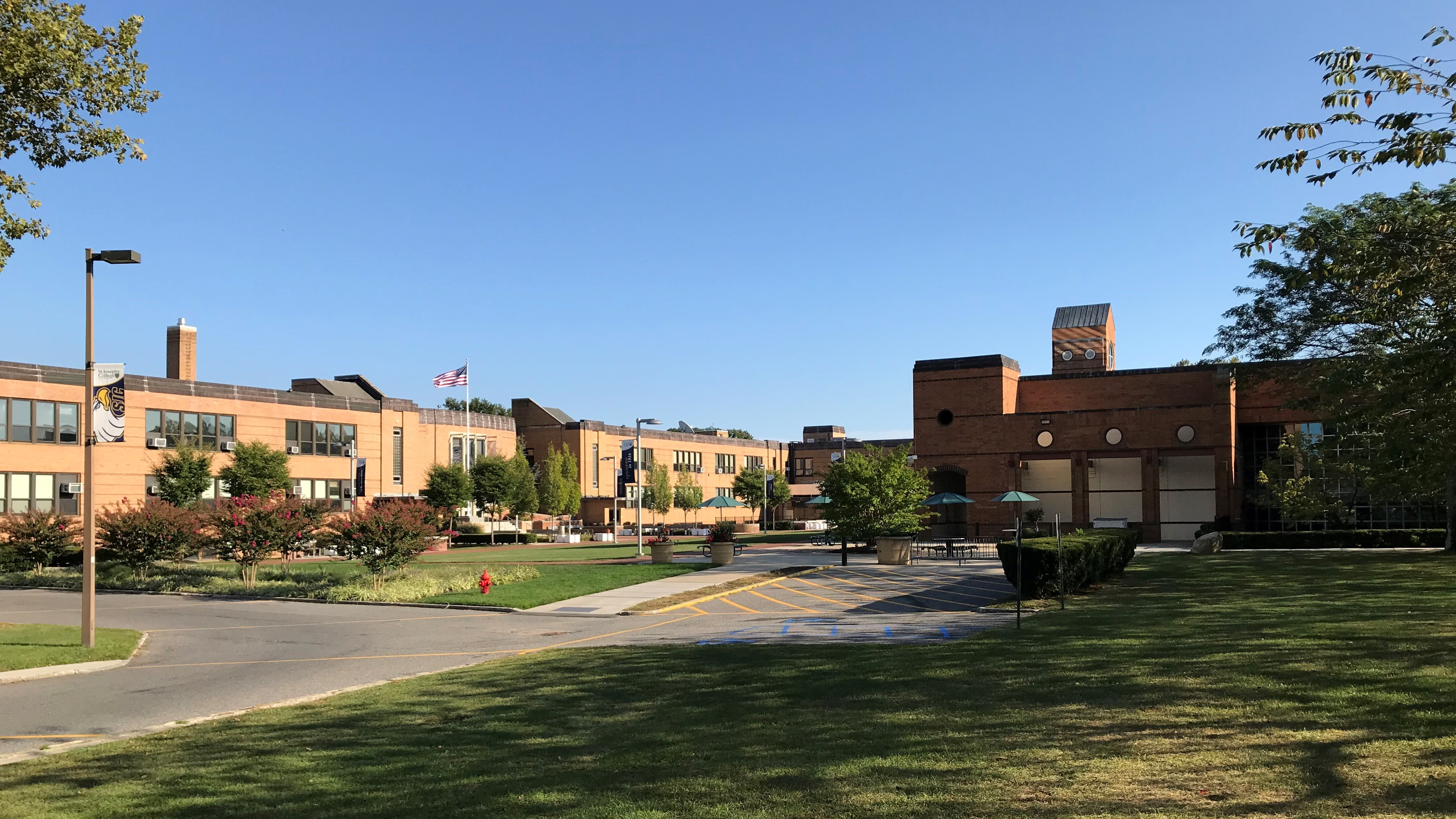
St. Joseph's University in Patchogue

- State University of New York
  - Stony Brook University in Stony Brook with a satellite campus in Southampton
  - Farmingdale State College in East Farmingdale
  - Suffolk County Community College in Selden, Riverhead, and Brentwood, satellite centers in Sayville and Riverhead
- Private
  - Five Towns College in Dix Hills
  - St. Joseph's University in Patchogue
  - Touro University System with its School of Health Sciences in Central Islip and its Law Center in Central Islip
  - Cold Spring Harbor Laboratory School of Biological Sciences in Cold Spring Harbor
- Satellite and branch campuses
  - Adelphi University in Hauppauge
  - Long Island University in Brentwood and Riverhead, on the campuses of Suffolk County Community College
  - Molloy University in Amityville

=== School districts ===
School districts (all officially designated for grades K-12) include:

- Amagansett Union Free School District
- Amityville Union Free School District
- Babylon Union Free School District
- Bay Shore Union Free School District
- Bayport-Blue Point School District
- Brentwood Union Free School District
- Bridgehampton Union Free School District
- Comsewogue School District
- Center Moriches Union Free School District
- Central Islip Union Free School District
- Cold Spring Harbor Central School District
- Commack Union Free School District
- Connetquot Central School District
- Copiague Union Free School District
- Deer Park Union Free School District
- East Hampton Union Free School District
- East Islip Union Free School District
- East Moriches Union Free School District
- East Quogue Union Free School District
- Eastport-South Manor Central School District
- Elwood Union Free School District
- Farmingdale Union Free School District
- Fire Island Union Free School District (only operates elementary school)
- Fishers Island Union Free School District
- Greenport Union Free School District
- Half Hollow Hills Central School District
- Hampton Bays Union Free School District
- Harborfields Central School District
- Hauppauge Union Free School District
- Huntington Union Free School District
- Islip Union Free School District
- Kings Park Central School District
- Lindenhurst Union Free School District
- Middle Country Central School District
- Longwood Central School District
- Mattituck-Cutchogue Union Free School District
- Miller Place Union Free School District
- Montauk Union Free School District
- Mount Sinai School District
- New Suffolk Common School District
- North Babylon Union Free School District
- Northport-East Northport Union Free School District
- Oysterponds Union Free School District
- Patchogue-Medford School District
- Port Jefferson Union Free School District
- Quogue Union Free School District
- Remsenburg-Speonk Union Free School District
- Riverhead Central School District
- Rocky Point Union Free School District
- Sachem Central School District
- Sag Harbor Union Free School District
- Sagaponack Common School District
- Sayville School District
- Shelter Island Union Free School District
- Shoreham-Wading River Central School District
- Smithtown Central School District
- South Country Central School District
- South Huntington Union Free School District
- Southampton Union Free School District
- Southold Union Free School District
- Springs Union Free School District
- Three Village Central School District
- Tuckahoe Common School District
- Wainscott Common School District
- West Babylon Union Free School District
- West Islip Union Free School District
- Westhampton Beach Union Free School District
- William Floyd Union Free School District
- Wyandanch Union Free School District

== Media ==
=== Newspapers ===
- Amityville Record
- Bayport-Blue Point Gazette
- Dan's Papers
- Fire Island News
- Newsday
- Sayville Gazette
- Shelter Island Reporter
- The Beacon
- The Brookhaven Messenger
- The East Hampton Press
- The East Hampton Star
- The Islip Bulletin
- The Islip Messenger
- The Long Island Advance
- The Long–Islander
- The Port Times Record
- The Riverhead News-Review
- The Shelter Island Reporter
- The Smithtown Messenger
- The Southampton Press
- The Suffolk County News
- The Suffolk Times
- The Tide of Moriches and Manorville
- The Times Beacon Record
- The Times of Huntington
- The Times of Middle Country
- The Times of Northport and East Northport
- The Times of Smithtown
- The Village Beacon Record
- The Village Times Herald

=== Radio stations ===
- WALK-FM, Patchogue
- WAPP-LP, Westhampton
- WBAB, Babylon
- WBAZ, Bridgehampton
- WBEA, Southold
- WBLI, Patchogue
- WBWD, Islip
- WBZO, Westhampton
- WDRE, Riverhead
- WEER, Montauk
- WEGB, Napeague
- WEGQ, Quogue
- WEHM, Manorville
- WEHN, East Hampton
- WELJ, Montauk
- WFRS, Smithtown
- WGSS, Copiague
- WHFM, Southampton
- WJJF, Montauk
- WJVC, Center Moriches
- WLID, Patchogue
- WLIM, Medford
- WLIR-FM, Hampton Bays
- WLIW-FM, Southampton
- WLIX-LP, Ridge
- WLNG, Sag Harbor
- WNYG, Patchogue
- WNYH, Huntington
- WPLF, Shelter Island
- WPTY, Calverton-Roanoke
- WRCN-FM, Riverhead
- WRIV, Riverhead
- WRLI, Southampton
- WSHR, Lake Ronkonkoma
- WSUF, Noyack
- WUSB, Stony Brook
- WWSK, Smithtown
- WWWF-FM, Bay Shore
- WXBA, Brentwood

=== Television stations ===
- WFTY-DT, Smithtown
- WLNY-TV, Riverhead
- WVVH-CD, Southampton

== Suffolk seashore ==
Fire Island Lighthouse was an important landmark for many trans-Atlantic ships coming into New York Harbor in the early 20th century. For many European immigrants, the Fire Island Light was their first sight of land upon arrival in America.

The Fire Island Inlet span of the Robert Moses Causeway connects to Robert Moses State Park on the western tip of Fire Island.

The Great South Bay Bridge, the first causeway bridge, had only one northbound and one southbound lane, was opened to traffic in April 1954. The span of 2 miles (3 km) across Great South Bay to Captree Island features a main span of 600 feet (200 m), with a clearance for boats of 60 feet (20 m).

After crossing the State Boat Channel over its 665-foot-long (203 m) bascule bridge, the causeway meets the Ocean Parkway at a cloverleaf interchange. This interchange provides access to Captree State Park, Gilgo State Park and Jones Beach State Park.

The Fire Island Inlet Bridge continues the two-lane road, one lane in each direction, across Fire Island Inlet to its terminus at Robert Moses State Park and The Fire Island Lighthouse. Robert Moses Causeway opened in 1964.

Suffolk County has the most lighthouses of any United States county, with 15 of its original 26 lighthouses still standing. Of these 15, eight are in Southold township alone, giving it more lighthouses than any other township in the United States.

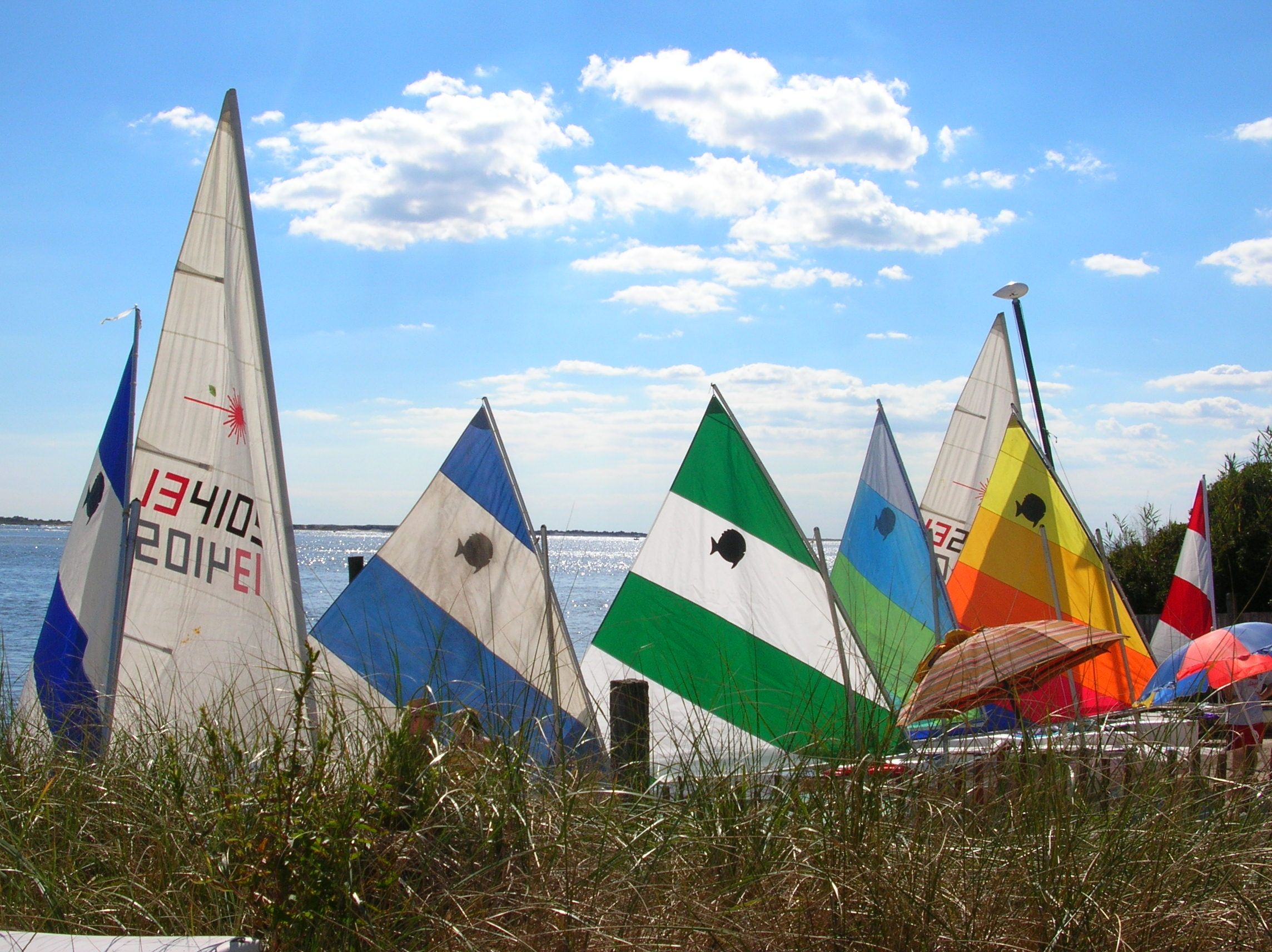
West Gilgo Beach, New York – Oak Beach

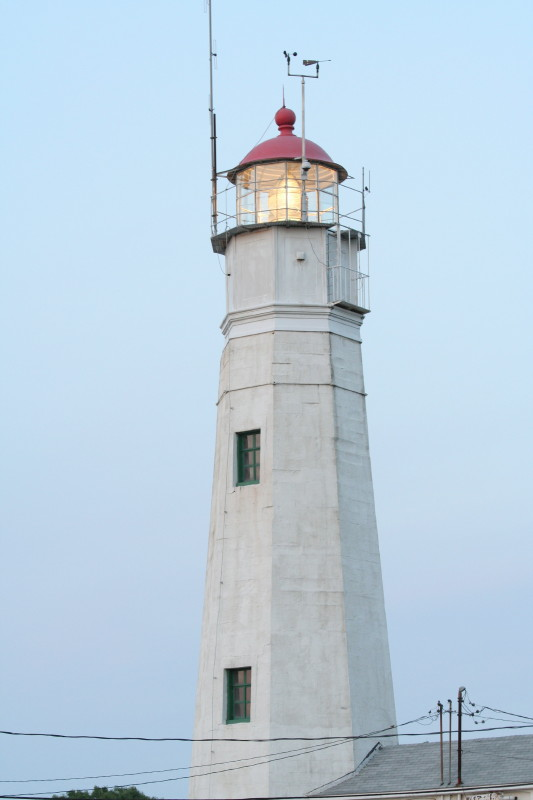
Huntington Bay, New York

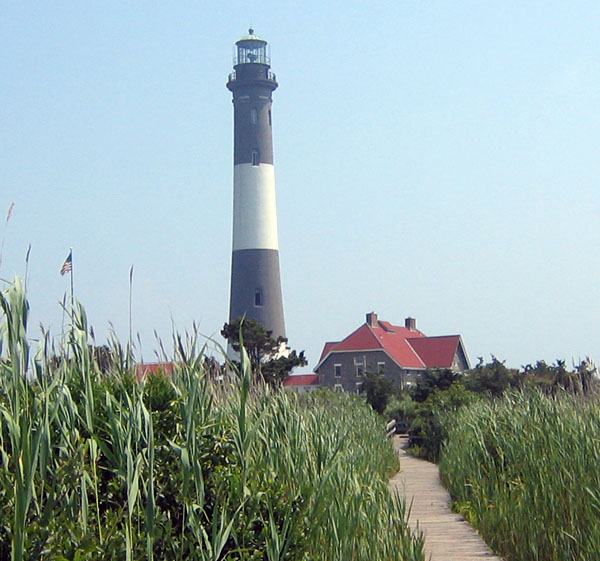
Fire Island Lighthouse

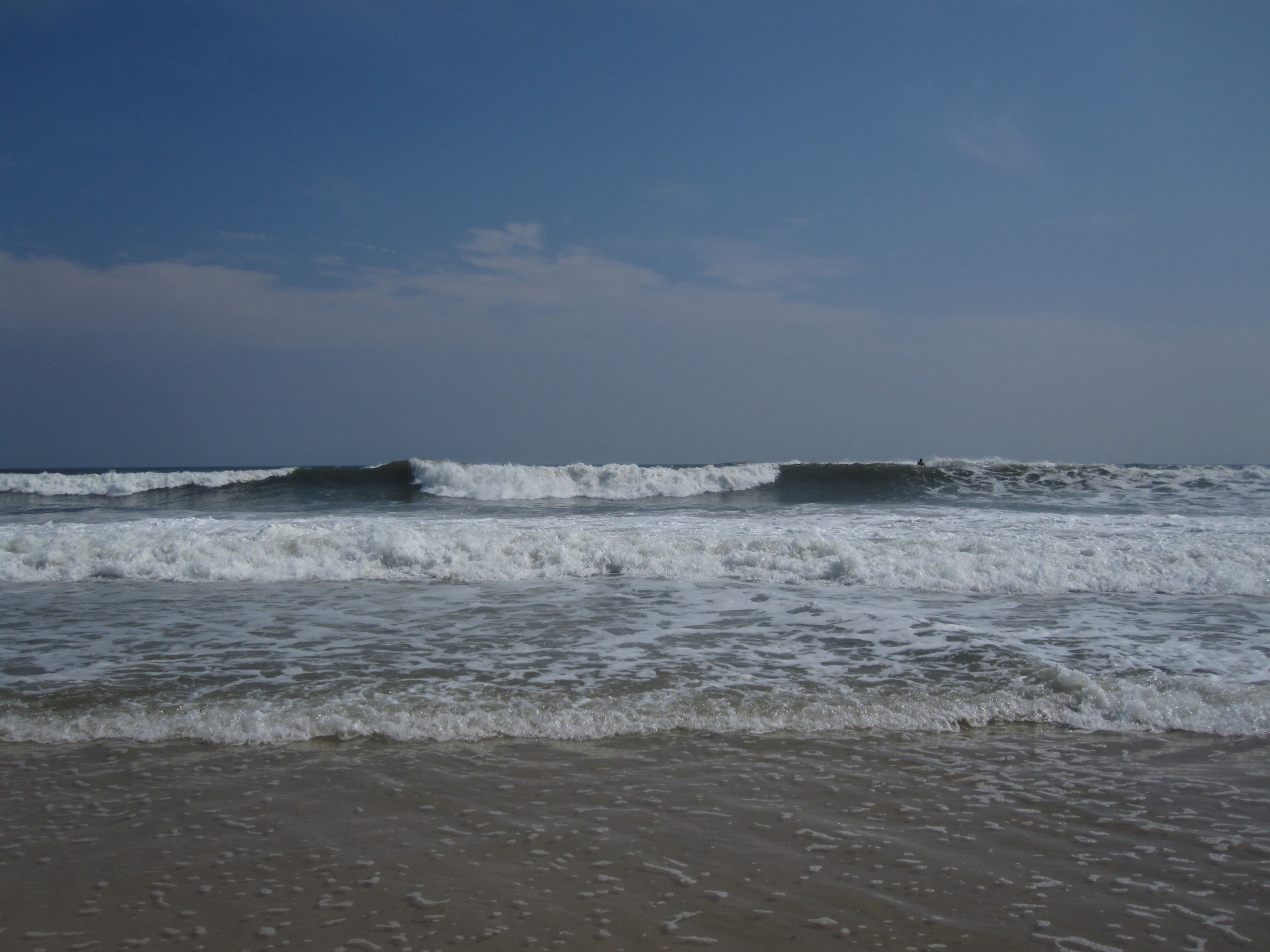
Fire Island National Seashore

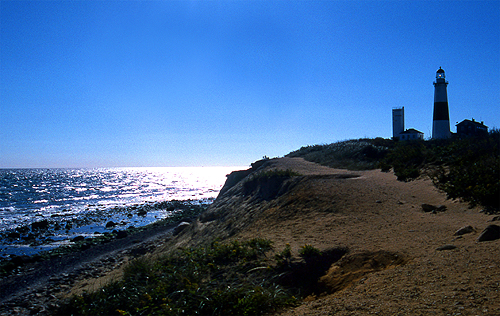
Montauk Lighthouse, a Suffolk County landmark pictured in 1997

== Secessionist movements ==
At various times, there have been proposals for a division of Suffolk County into two counties. The western portion would be called Suffolk County, while the eastern portion of the current Suffolk County would comprise a new county to be called Peconic County. Peconic County would consist of the five easternmost towns of Suffolk County: East Hampton, Riverhead, Shelter Island, Southampton and Southold, plus the Shinnecock Indian Reservation.

The proposed Peconic County flag showed the two forks at the east end of Long Island separated by Peconic Bay. The star on the north represents Southold. The stars on the South Fork represent Southampton and East Hampton. Riverhead is at the fork mouth and Shelter Island is between the forks. The secessionist movement has not been active since 1998.

The End of the Hamptons: Scenes from the Class Struggle in America's Paradise, by Corey Dolgon (New York University Press, 2005) examined the class roots of the secessionist movement in the Hamptons. In his review, Howard Zinn wrote that the book "[t]akes us beyond the much-romanticized beaches of Long Island to the rich entrepreneurs and their McMansions, the Latino workers, and the stubborn indigenous residents refusing to disappear. The book is important because it is in so many ways a microcosm of the nation." The book won the Association for Humanist Sociology's 2005 Book Prize and the American Sociological Association's Marxist Section Book Award in 2007.

== Finance and taxation ==
Suffolk County has an 8.625% sales tax, compared to an overall New York State sales tax of 4%, consisting of an additional 4.25% on top of the state and MTA assessment of .375%

== Health ==
In March 2020, the COVID-19 pandemic first affected the county. As of December 12, 2020, there have been a total of 73,281 cases and 2,153 deaths from the virus.

== Hospitals ==
Tertiary care hospitals:

- Good Samaritan University Hospital
- South Shore University Hospital
- Stony Brook University Hospital

Community hospitals:

- Huntington Hospital
- Mather Hospital
- NYU Langone Hospital — Suffolk
- Peconic Bay Medical Center
- Stony Brook Eastern Long Island Hospital
- Stony Brook Southampton Hospital
- St. Charles Hospital
- Saint Catherine of Siena Medical Center

Specialty care hospitals:

- South Oaks Hospital
- Stony Brook Children's Hospital

== Communities ==
Municipalities of Suffolk County

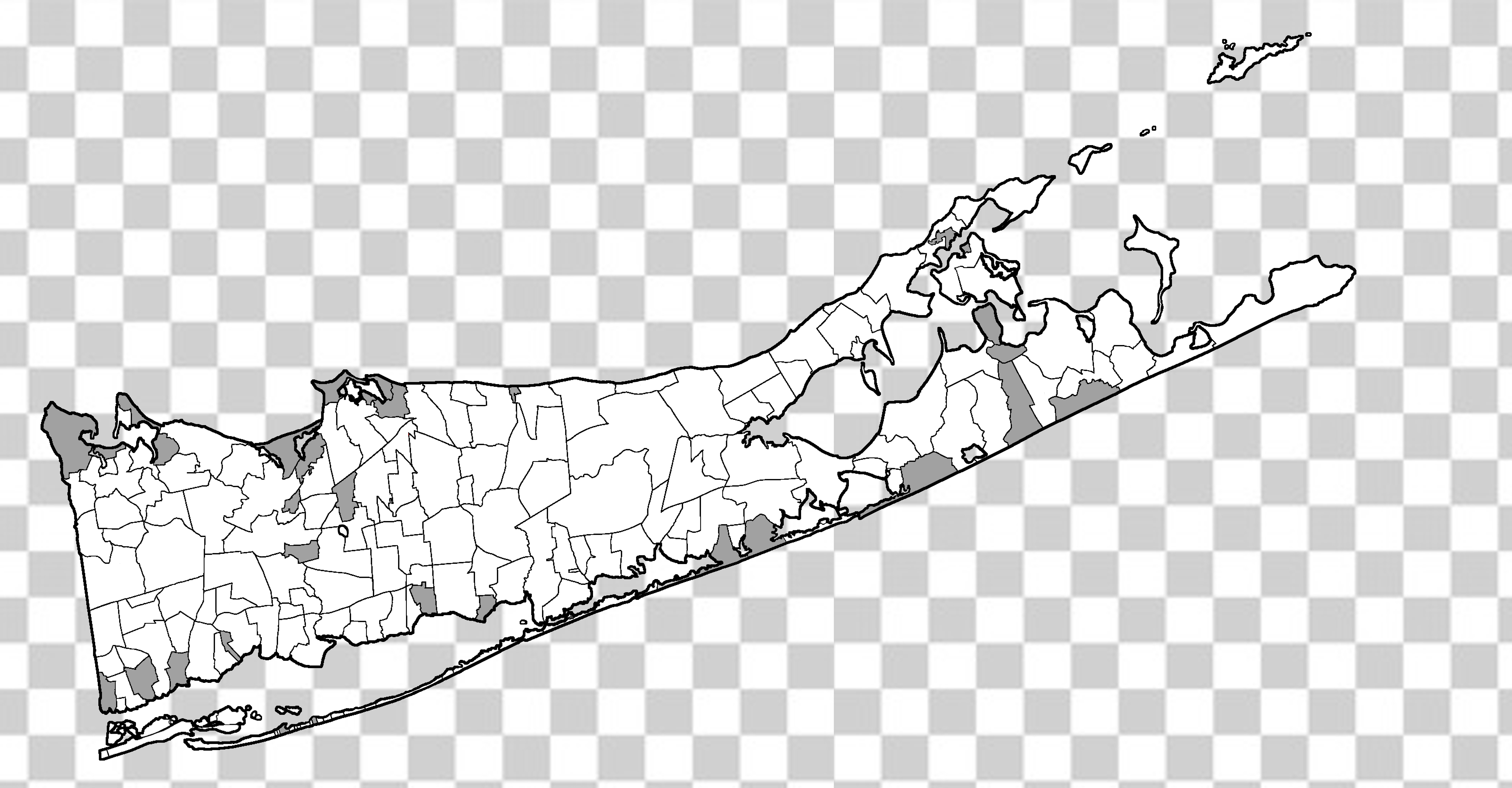
A map outlining the villages (grey), hamlets, and CDPs of Suffolk County

In the State of New York, a town is the major subdivision of each county. Towns provide or arrange for most municipal services for residents of hamlets and selected services for residents of villages. All residents of New York who do not live in a city or on an Indian reservation live in a town. A village is an incorporated area which is usually, but not always, within a single town. A village is a clearly defined municipality that provides the services closest to the residents, such as garbage collection, street and highway maintenance, street lighting and building codes. Some villages provide their own police and other optional services. A hamlet is an informally defined populated area within a town that is not part of a village.

Figures in parentheses are 2022 population estimates from the Census Bureau.

=== Towns ===
- Babylon (217,656)
- Brookhaven (488,497)
- East Hampton (28,607)
- Huntington (203,243)
- Islip (337,922)
- Riverhead (35,834)
- Shelter Island (3,276)
- Smithtown (115,768)
- Southampton (69,490)
- Southold (23,912)

=== Villages (incorporated) ===
- Amityville (9,573)
- Asharoken (603)
- Babylon (12,146)
- Belle Terre (782)
- Bellport (2,197)
- Brightwaters (3,170)
- Dering Harbor (36)
- East Hampton (1,531)
- Greenport (2,583)
- Head of the Harbor (1,481)
- Huntington Bay (1,427)
- Islandia (3,568)
- Lake Grove (11,041)
- Lindenhurst (27,064)
- Lloyd Harbor (3,551)
- Nissequogue (1,603)
- North Haven (1,161)
- Northport (7,300)
- Ocean Beach (171)
- Old Field (906)
- Patchogue (12,344)
- Poquott (925)
- Port Jefferson (8,059)
- Quogue (1,687)
- Sag Harbor (2,785)
- Sagaponack (736)
- Saltaire (110)
- Shoreham (521)
- Southampton (4,615)
- Village of the Branch (1,759)
- Westhampton Beach (2,183)
- West Hampton Dunes (115)

=== Census-designated places (unincorporated) ===
- Amagansett
- Aquebogue
- Baiting Hollow
- Bay Shore
- Bayport
- Baywood
- Blue Point
- Bohemia
- Brentwood
- Bridgehampton
- Brookhaven
- Calverton
- Captree
- Center Moriches
- Centereach
- Centerport
- Central Islip
- Cold Spring Harbor
- Commack
- Copiague
- Coram
- Cutchogue
- Deer Park
- Dix Hills
- East Farmingdale
- East Hampton North
- East Islip
- East Marion
- East Moriches
- East Northport
- East Patchogue
- East Quogue
- East Setauket
- East Shoreham
- Eastport
- Eatons Neck
- Elwood
- Farmingville
- Fire Island
- Fishers Island
- Flanders
- Fort Salonga
- Gilgo
- Gordon Heights
- Great River
- Greenlawn
- Greenport West
- Halesite
- Hampton Bays
- Hauppauge
- Holbrook
- Holtsville
- Huntington
- Huntington Station
- Islip
- Islip Terrace
- Jamesport
- Kings Park
- Lake Ronkonkoma
- Laurel
- Manorville
- Mastic
- Mastic Beach
- Mattituck
- Medford
- Melville
- Middle Island
- Miller Place
- Montauk
- Moriches
- Mount Sinai
- Napeague
- Nesconset
- New Suffolk
- North Amityville
- North Babylon
- North Bay Shore
- North Bellport
- North Great River
- North Lindenhurst
- North Patchogue
- North Sea
- Northampton
- Northville
- Northwest Harbor
- Noyack
- Oak Beach
- Oakdale
- Orient
- Peconic
- Port Jefferson Station
- Quiogue
- Remsenburg-Speonk
- Ridge
- Riverhead
- Riverside
- Rocky Point
- Ronkonkoma
- Sayville
- Selden
- Setauket
- Shelter Island
- Shelter Island Heights
- Shinnecock Hills
- Shirley
- Smithtown
- Sound Beach
- South Huntington
- Southold
- Springs
- St. James
- Stony Brook
- Stony Brook University
- Terryville
- Tuckahoe
- Wading River
- Wainscott
- Water Mill
- West Babylon
- West Bay Shore
- West Hills
- West Islip
- West Sayville
- Westhampton
- Wheatley Heights
- Wyandanch
- Yaphank
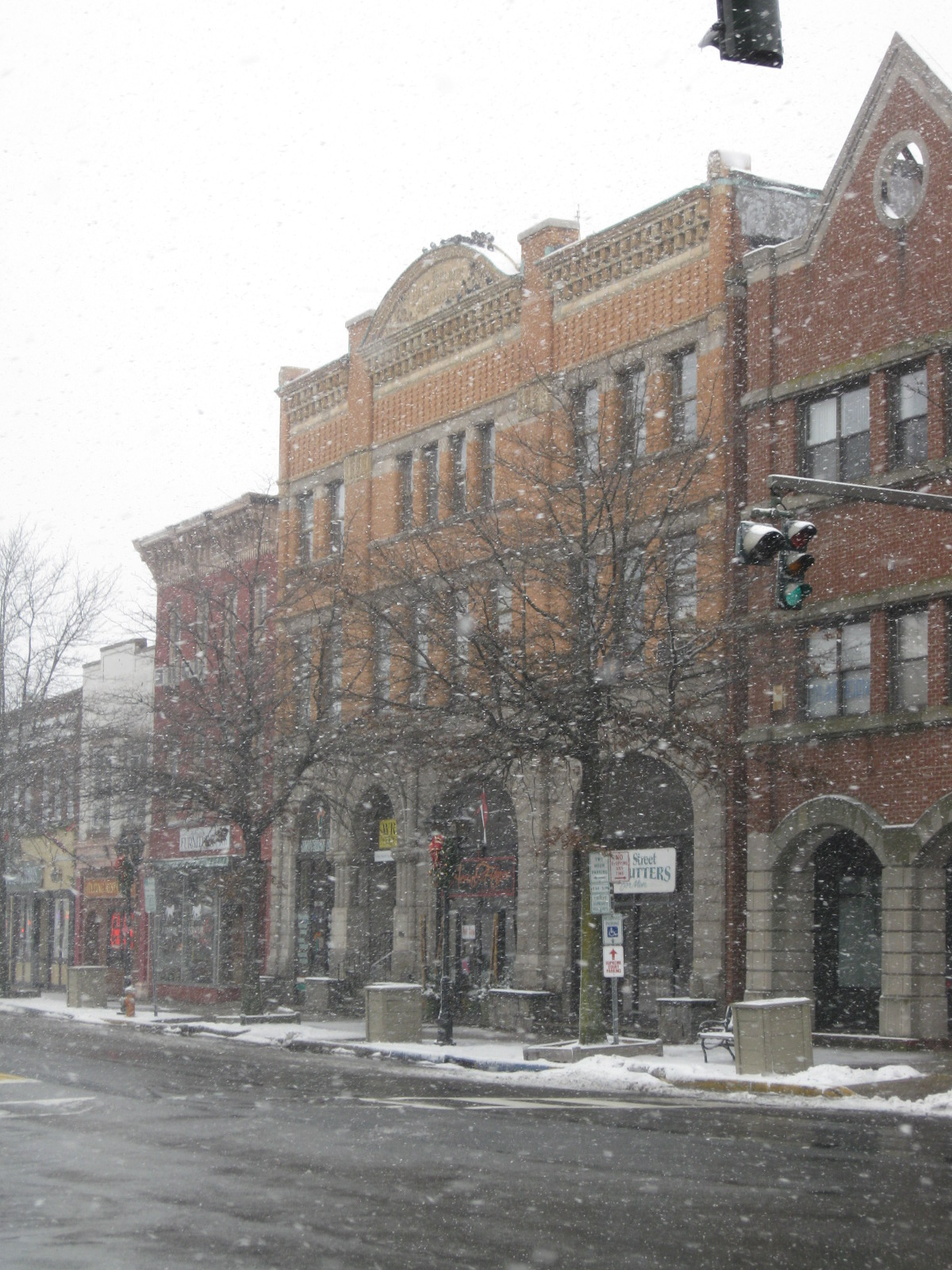
Riverhead, New York

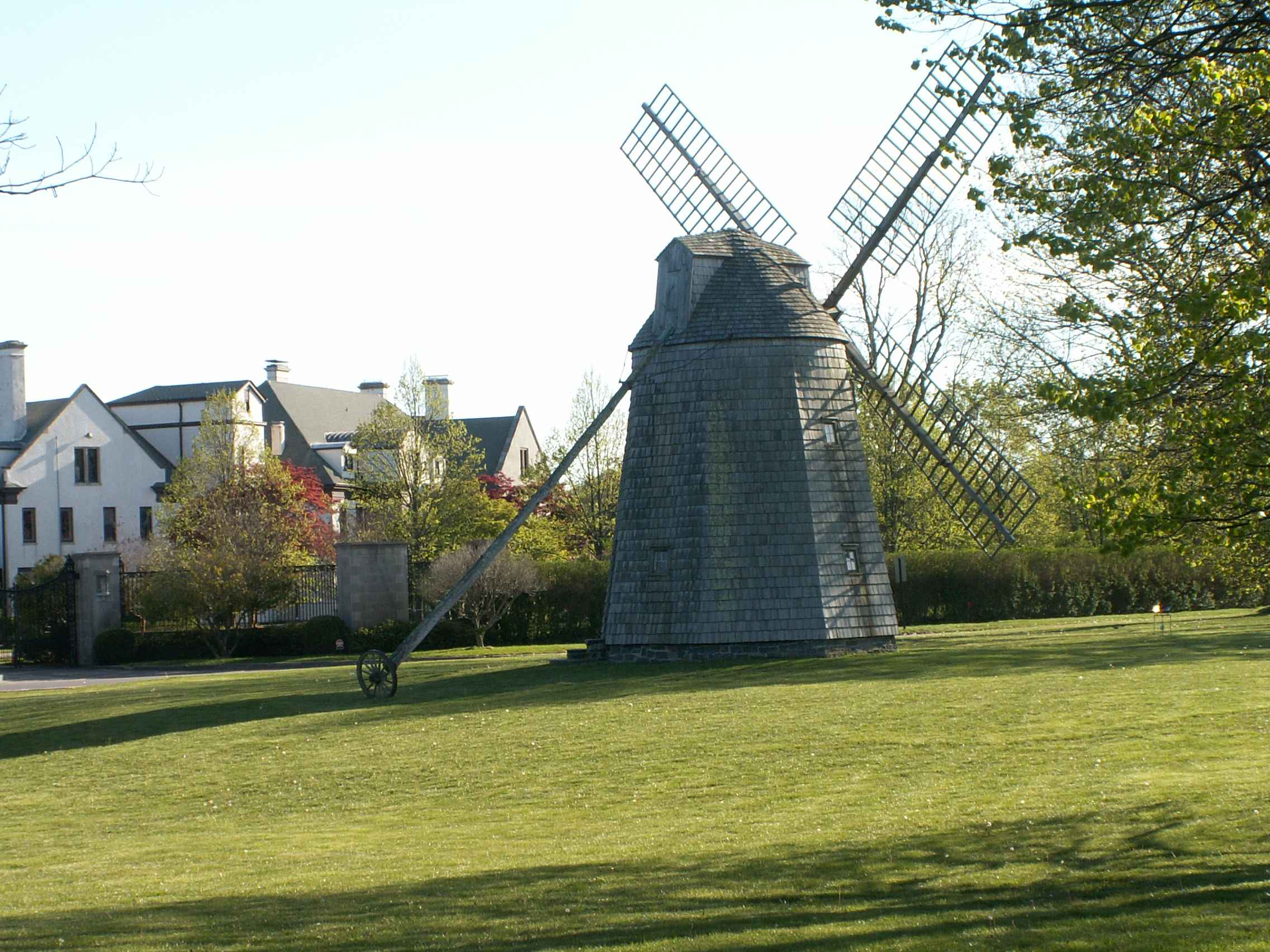
Watermill, New York

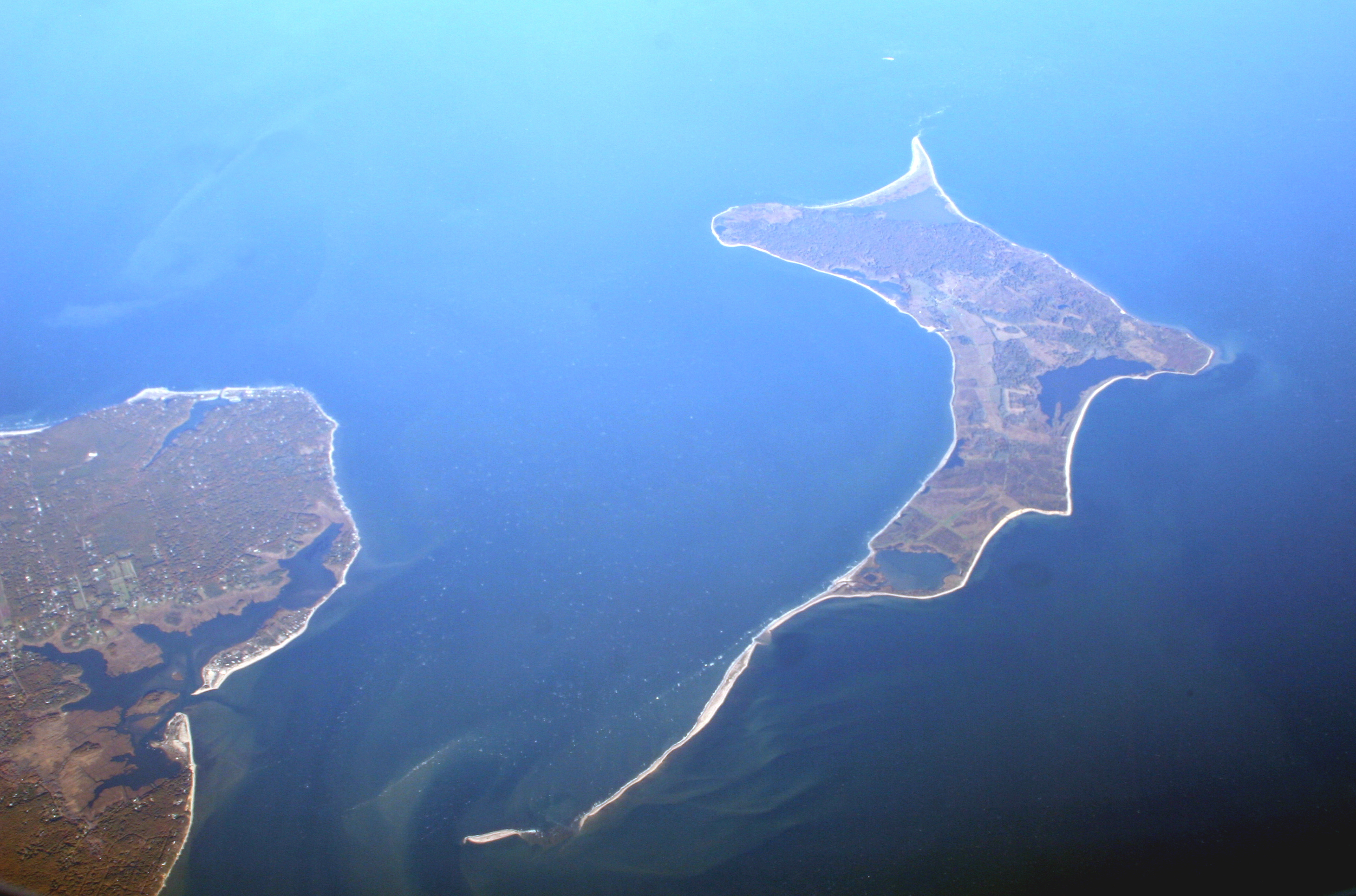
Gardiners Island in Suffolk County

=== Gardiners Island ===
Gardiners Island is an island off eastern Suffolk County. The Island is 6 miles (10 km) long, and 3 miles (5 km) wide and has 27 miles (43 km) of coastline. The same family has owned the Island for nearly 400 years; one of the largest privately owned islands in America or the world. In addition, it is the only American real estate still intact as part of an original royal grant from the English Crown.

=== Robins Island ===
Robins Island is an Island in the Peconic Bay between the North and South folks of eastern Suffolk County. It is within the jurisdiction of Town of Southold in Suffolk County, New York. The Island is 435 acres (1.8 km^{2}) and presently undeveloped. The island is privately owned and not accessible to the public.

=== Indian reservations ===
Two Indian reservations are within the borders of Suffolk County:

- Shinnecock Reservation
- Poospatuck Reservation

== Transportation ==
The county includes a lot of roadways and other public transportation infrastructure. The local Suffolk County Legislature oversees funding and regulations for the infrastructure. In 2019, the legislature required all new projects to account for future climate change caused sea level rise.

=== Major highways ===
- I-495 (Long Island Expressway) traverses the county from the Nassau County line in the West to Riverhead in the East. Original plans called for the Expressway to extend further past Riverhead and along the island's North Fork, possibly to Orient Point, where a crossing to Connecticut could be built. The expressway connects to Manhattan via the Queens-Midtown Tunnel.
- New York State Route 27 crosses the county from the Nassau County line in the West to Montauk Point in the East, which is also the easternmost point in the State of New York. The road is limited-access from West Babylon to Southampton.

=== Airports ===
Commercial airport:

- Long Island MacArthur Airport (ISP/KISP)

General aviation airports:

- Republic Airport (FRG/KFRG)
- Brookhaven Calabro Airport (WSH/KHWV/HWV)
- Francis S. Gabreski Airport (FOK/KFOK)
- Town of East Hampton Airport (JPX/KJPX)
- Elizabeth Field (Fisher's Island) (FID/0B8)

=== Public transportation ===
Suffolk County is served by Suffolk County Transit. Long Island Rail Road, the Hampton Jitney, and Hampton Luxury Liner connect Suffolk County to New York City. Some parts of Suffolk County are also served by NICE bus.

== Notable people ==
- Craig Biggio, Kings Park
- Jimmy Buffett, Sag Harbor
- Mariah Carey, Huntington
- Boomer Esiason, East Islip
- Mick Foley, East Setauket
- Ted Gregory, East Islip
- Kevin James, Stony Brook
- Billy Joel, Amagansett
- Carl Yastrzemski, Southampton

== See also ==
- List of counties in New York
- National Register of Historic Places listings in Suffolk County, New York
- Suffolk County, Farmland Development Rights
- USS Suffolk County (LST-1173)

== Bibliography ==
- Portrait and Biological Record of Suffolk County (Long Island) New York – Containing Portraits and Biographical Sketches of Prominent and Representative Citizens of the County – Together with Biographies and Portraits of All the Presidents of the United States. Chapman Publishing Company. 1896. LCCN 01014266. OCLC 35905707 – via Google Books (New York Public Library).
