= Sayville National Wildlife Refuge =

Protected area in New York, US

- IUCN category IV (habitat/species management area)
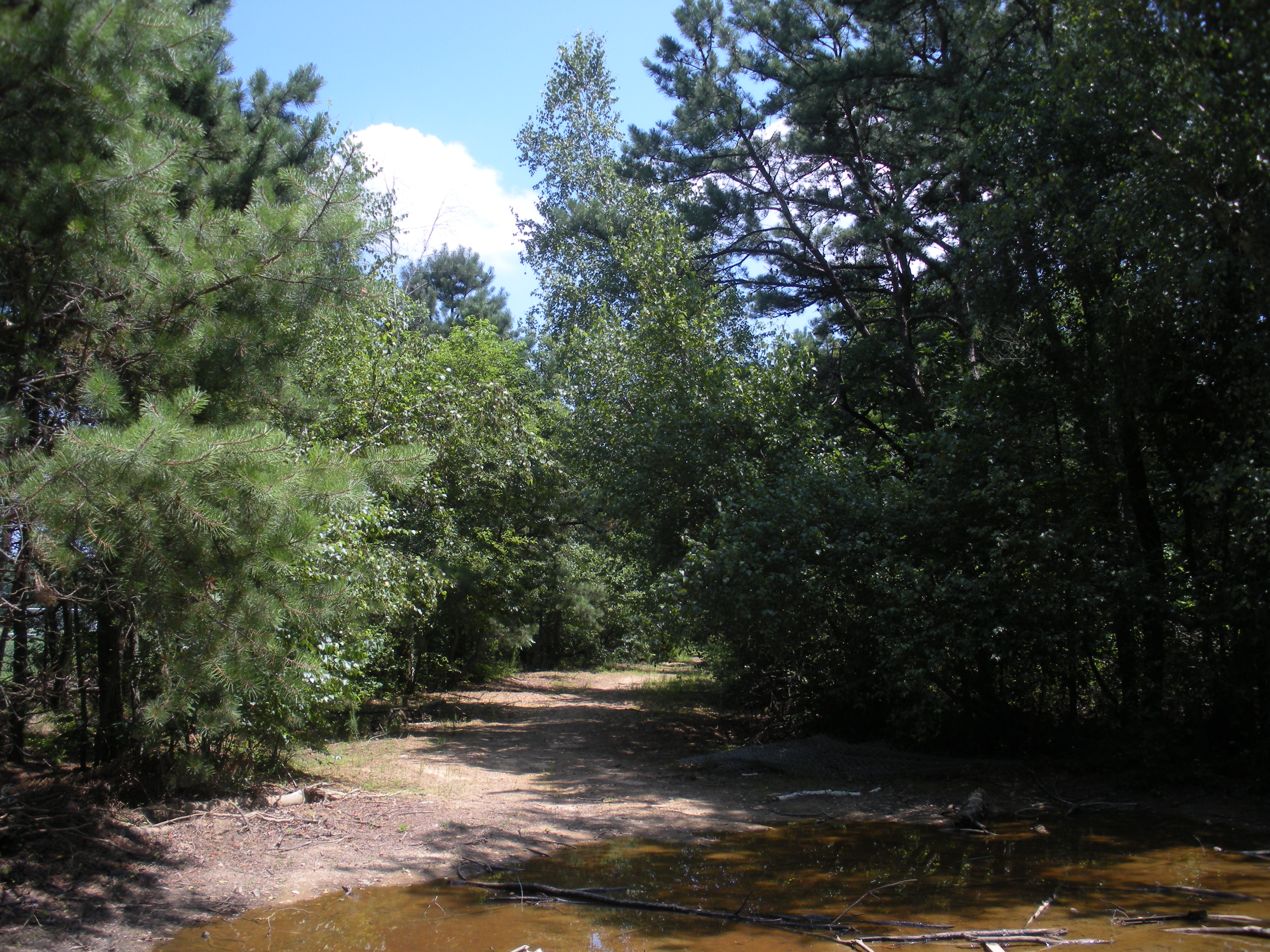

- Location within New York Location within the United States
- Location: Suffolk County, New York, United States
- Nearest city: West Sayville, New York
- Coordinates: 40°44′52″N 73°06′18″W
- Area: 127 acres (51 ha)
- Established: 1992
- Governing body: U.S. Fish and Wildlife Service
- Website: Sayville National Wildlife Refuge

The Sayville National Wildlife Refuge is a 127-acre (51 ha) National Wildlife Refuge (NWR) located in West Sayville, New York about two miles (3.2 km) inland from the Great South Bay. Sayville NWR is managed by the U.S. Fish and Wildlife Service as a sub-unit of Wertheim National Wildlife Refuge and part of the Long Island National Wildlife Refuge Complex. It is the only land-locked refuge in the complex.

Sayville consists primarily of oak-pitch pine forests interspersed with grasslands. This sub-unit supports a diversity of migratory songbirds and raptors. The refuge contains the largest population of sandplain gerardia (a federally endangered plant) in the state of New York. Management activities focus on protecting and enhancing habitat for this endangered plant and for migratory birds.

== History ==
The refuge was established in 1992 by the transfer of a 26-acre (11 ha) parcel of vacant Federal Aviation Administration land. In 1990, Congress legislated the transfer of an additional 101-acre (41 ha) parcel from the FAA to the refuge. That exchange was to be completed after the FAA had removed all buildings and improvements. Those have since been removed, and the transfer was completed in February 2007.
