= Long Island National Wildlife Refuge Complex =

Wildlife refuge in New York

Coordinates: 40.793734°N 72.880839°W

Long Island National Wildlife Refuge Complex is a National Wildlife Refuge complex in the state of New York. All of the component refuges are located on Long Island.

The Long Island National Wildlife Refuge Complex consists of seven national wildlife refuges, two refuge sub-units and one wildlife management area, all managed by the U.S. Fish and Wildlife Service. Collectively, the ten units are approximately 6,500 acres (26 km^{2}) in size. Each unit is unique and provides wildlife habitat amongst Long Island's urban settings essential for the livelihood of migratory birds, threatened and endangered species, fish and other wildlife. The strategic location of Long Island in the Long Island Pine Barrens and along the Atlantic Flyway make it an important nesting, wintering and migratory stop over area for hundreds of species of birds.

== Refuges within the complex ==
- Amagansett National Wildlife Refuge
- Conscience Point National Wildlife Refuge
- Elizabeth A. Morton National Wildlife Refuge
- Lido Beach Wildlife Management Area
- Oyster Bay National Wildlife Refuge
- Sayville National Wildlife Refuge
- Seatuck National Wildlife Refuge
- Target Rock National Wildlife Refuge
- Wertheim National Wildlife Refuge
