= Amagansett National Wildlife Refuge =

Protected area in New York, US

- IUCN category IV (habitat/species management area)
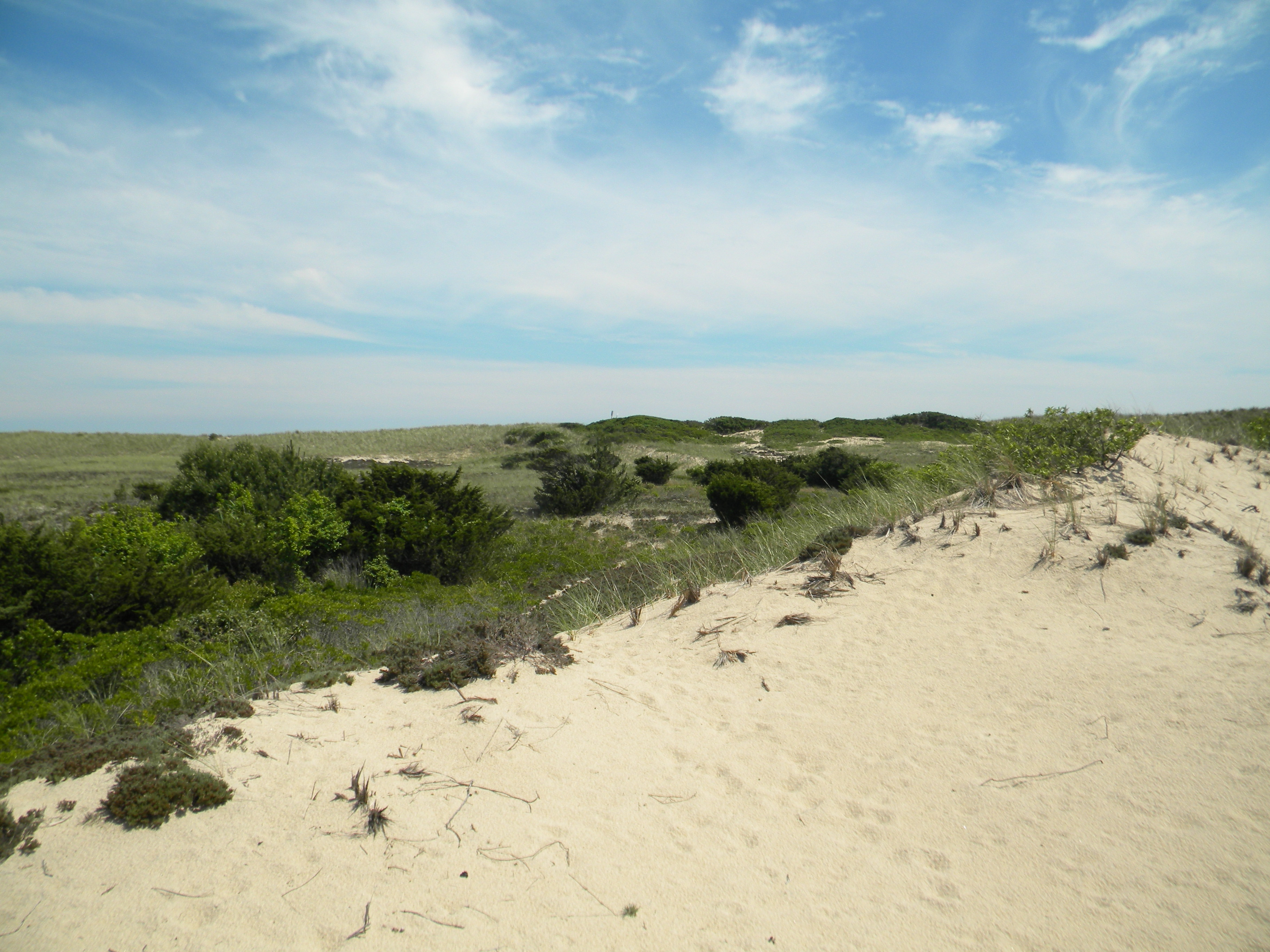
- Dunes at Amagansett National Wildlife Refuge

- Location within New York Location within the United States
- Location: Suffolk County, New York, United States
- Nearest city: Amagansett, New York
- Coordinates: 40.96972°N 72.12638°W
- Area: 36 acres (15 ha)
- Established: 1968
- Governing body: U.S. Fish and Wildlife Service
- Website: Amagansett National Wildlife Refuge

The Amagansett National Wildlife Refuge, in Amagansett, New York, is located along the shore of the Atlantic Ocean on Long Island's south fork. The refuge is managed by the United States Fish and Wildlife Service as part of the Long Island National Wildlife Refuge Complex.

Established December 16, 1968, the 36-acre (15 ha) refuge is of special significance in the protection and management of fragile shore habitat and wildlife. A major purpose of the refuge is the protection of the secondary dunes, which have become scarce on Long Island due to development. The double dune system encompasses marine sand beach, primary dunes, secondary dunes, swales, fens, cranberry bogs, and oak scrub. Many rare plants, including several orchids, occur on the refuge.

Long-tailed ducks, white-winged scoter, common loon and horned grebe spend winter off the refuge shore, while shorebirds, songbirds and raptors are present during spring and fall. Merlin, Cooper's hawk, kestrel, sharp-shinned hawk, and peregrine falcon pass over the dunes during migration. Ipswich sparrow, rough-legged hawk, and short-eared owl spend winter at the refuge. In late spring and summer the beach hosts piping plover, and common and least terns (protected by the Endangered Species Act) as well as sandpiper and other shorebirds. The eastern hognose snake, a New York State designated species of special concern, can still be found on the refuge.
