= Target Rock National Wildlife Refuge =

Wildlife refuge in Suffolk County, New York

- IUCN category IV (habitat/species management area)
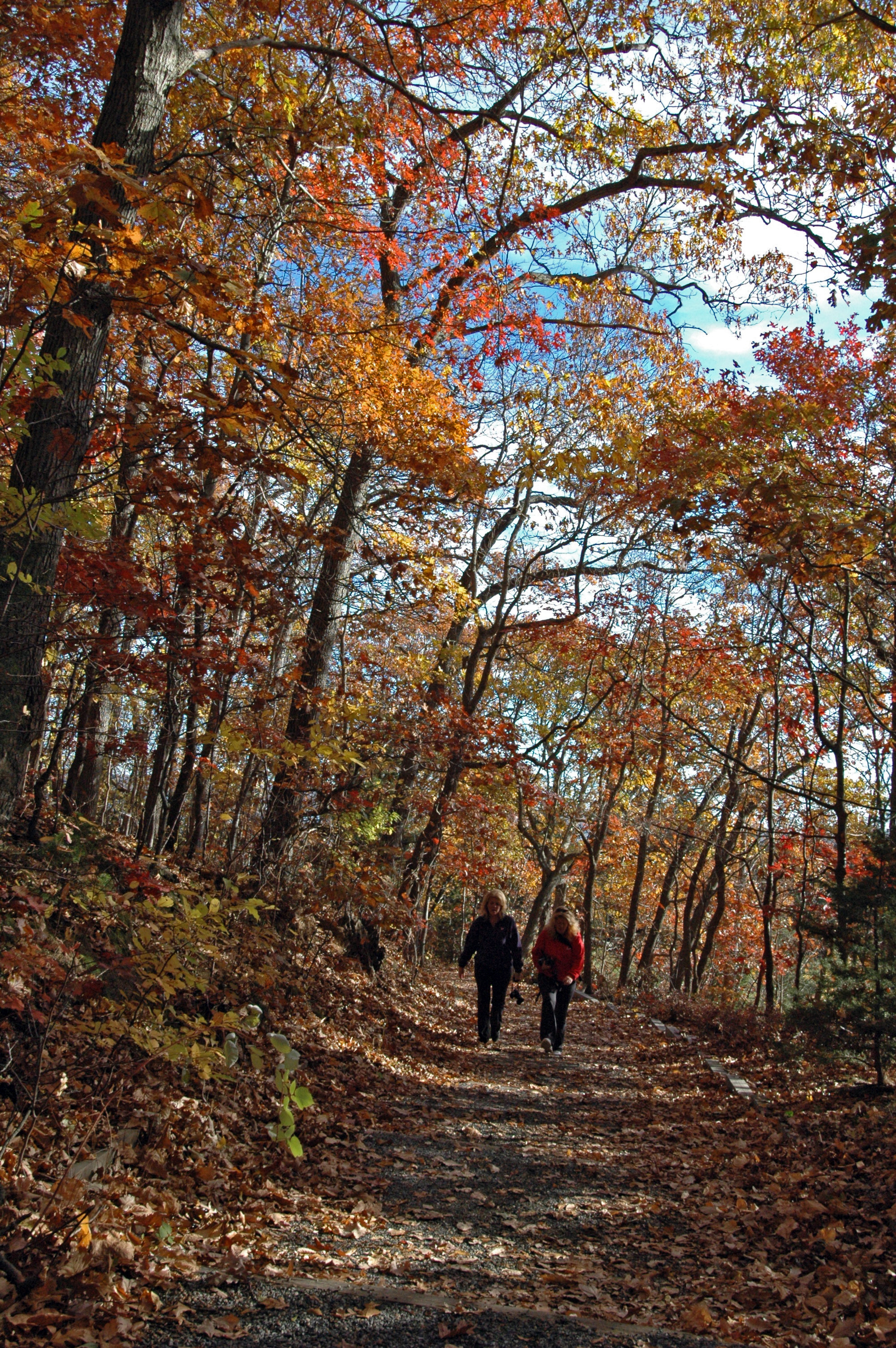

- Location within New York Location within the United States
- Location: Suffolk County, New York, United States
- Nearest city: Lloyd Harbor, New York
- Coordinates: 40°55′22″N 73°25′51″W
- Area: 80 acres (0.32 km^{2})
- Established: 1967
- Governing body: U.S. Fish and Wildlife Service
- Website: Target Rock National Wildlife Refuge

The Target Rock National Wildlife Refuge is located within the village of Lloyd Harbor, New York, on the North Shore of Long Island, approximately 25 miles (40 km) east of New York City. It is managed by the U.S. Fish and Wildlife Service as part of the Long Island National Wildlife Refuge Complex.

== Description ==
The 80-acre (32 ha) refuge is composed of mature oak-hickory forest, a one-half-mile (0.80 km) rocky beach, a brackish pond, and several vernal ponds. The land and waters support a variety of songbirds (particularly warblers during spring migration), mammals, shorebirds, fish, reptiles and amphibians. During the colder months, diving ducks are common offshore, while harbor seals occasionally use the beach and nearby rocks as resting sites. New York State and federally protected piping plover, least tern, and common tern depend on the refuge's rocky shore for foraging and rearing young.

The spring bloom at Target Rock is a reminder of its days as a garden estate, with flowering rhododendrons and mountain laurel.

The property was donated to the federal government by Ferdinand Eberstadt.

== See also ==
- Oyster Bay National Wildlife Refuge
