= Corey Dolgon =

American author and sociologist

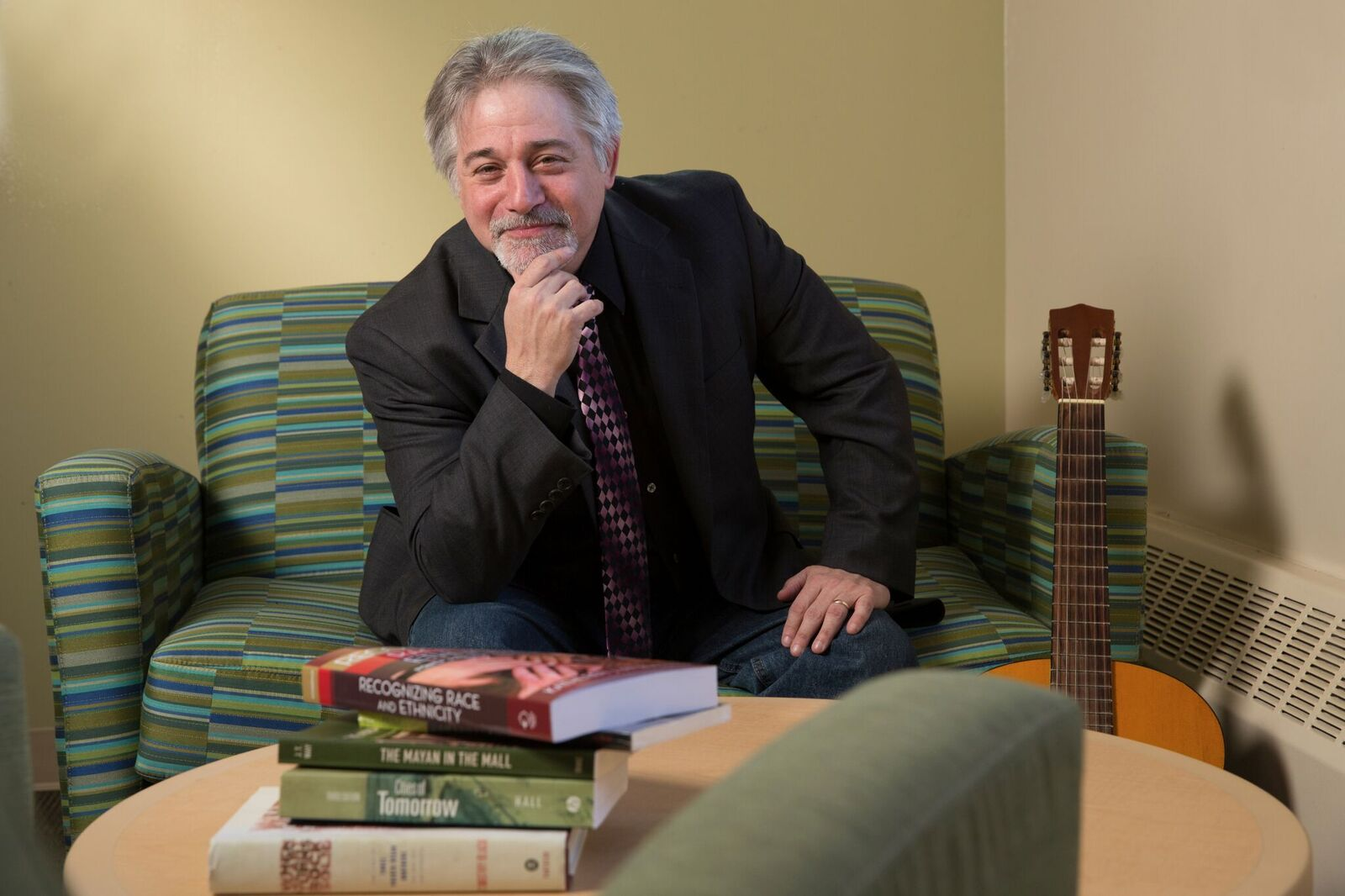
- Born: December 13, 1961 (age 64); Brooklyn, New York, U.S.
- Education: Boston University B.A.; Baylor University M.A.; University of Michigan, Ph.D.
- Occupations: Author; Sociologist
- Spouse: Deborah Milbauer married 2001-present
- Children: Bailey Dolgon, Ruby Dolgon
- Parent(s): Arlene and Fred Dolgon

Corey Dolgon is an American author and sociologist.

== Early life ==
Dolgon was born in Brooklyn, NY. He grew up in Brooklyn and on Long Island before moving to Cherry Hill, NJ, where he graduated from Cherry Hill West High School in 1980.

== Career ==
Dolgon's undergraduate thesis on folksongs and the American labor movement formed the foundation for a “singing lecture” that he has performed at dozens of colleges and universities and other venues around the country and around the world for almost two decades.

After working as a dorm director at Boston University and an organizer for the Public Interest research group in Michigan (PIRGIM), Dolgon obtained his PhD at the University of Michigan in 1987. While at the University of Michigan, Dolgon was an environmental activist, an anti-racism activist, a union organizer (Graduate Employees Organization), and a community activist.

He ran for Washtenaw County Commissioner in 1992.

Dolgon completed his PhD in American culture in 1994, entitled Innovators and Gravediggers: capital restructuring and class formation in Ann Arbor, Michigan, 1945-1994. Additionally, he has published numerous articles in scholarly journals, such as Junk Freedom, published in Critical Sociology, and Dim Mirrors, Dark Glasses: But This is Not Our Fate, published in Humanity & Society.

Dolgon worked with the Friends World Program of Long Island University from 1994 until 1997. After that, Dolgon began working as a sociology professor at Worcester State College [WSC], where he served as departmental chair from 1999 until 2009. Dolgon also served as editor of Humanity & Society: The Journal of the Association for Humanist Sociology Humanity & Society from 2000 to 2006, and was president of the organization in 2008.

In 2009, Dolgon became the inaugural director of Stonehill College's Office of Community Based Learning. He is also a tenured, full professor at Stonehill College. As a scholar, Dolgon has published five books, textbooks and anthologies. His first monograph, The End of the Hamptons: Scenes from the Class Struggle in America’s Paradise, won two book awards including The Association for Humanist Sociology's 2005 Book of the Year Award and the American Sociology Association's Marxist Section Book of the Year in 2007.

== Published works ==
- Dolgon, Corey (2017). Kill it to save it: an autopsy of capitalism's triumph over democracy. Bristol: Policy press. ISBN 978-1-4473-1713-5.
- Dolgon, Corey; Mitchell, Tania D.; Eatman, Timothy K. (February 1, 2017). The Cambridge Handbook of Service Learning and Community Engagement. Cambridge University Press. ISBN 978-1-316-88326-6.
- Dolgon, Corey; Baker, Chris (2010-08-03). Social Problems. Los Angeles London: SAGE Publications, Incorporated. ISBN 978-0-7619-2947-5.
- Dolgon, Corey; Chayko, Mary (March 2010). Pioneers of Public Sociology. Cornwall-on-Hudson, NY: Sloan Pub. ISBN 978-1-59738-026-3.
- Dolgon, Corey (2005). The End of the Hamptons: Scenes from the Class Struggle in America's Paradise. NYU Press. ISBN 978-0-8147-1958-9.

== Personal life ==
Dolgon is married to Deborah Milbauer, a public health consultant and instructor at Northeastern University. They have two daughters.

Dolgon's uncle, Herman Dolgon, was a WWII veteran who was a community organizer and activist in Sheepshead Bay, Brooklyn NY. Herman Dolgon helped organize veterans and supporters to pressure the New York City Housing Authority to build low-income public housing for returning vets. The New York City Department of Parks & Recreation Department named a playground for Herman Dolgon in 1951.
