= Wertheim National Wildlife Refuge =

Protected area in New York, USA

- IUCN category IV (habitat/species management area)
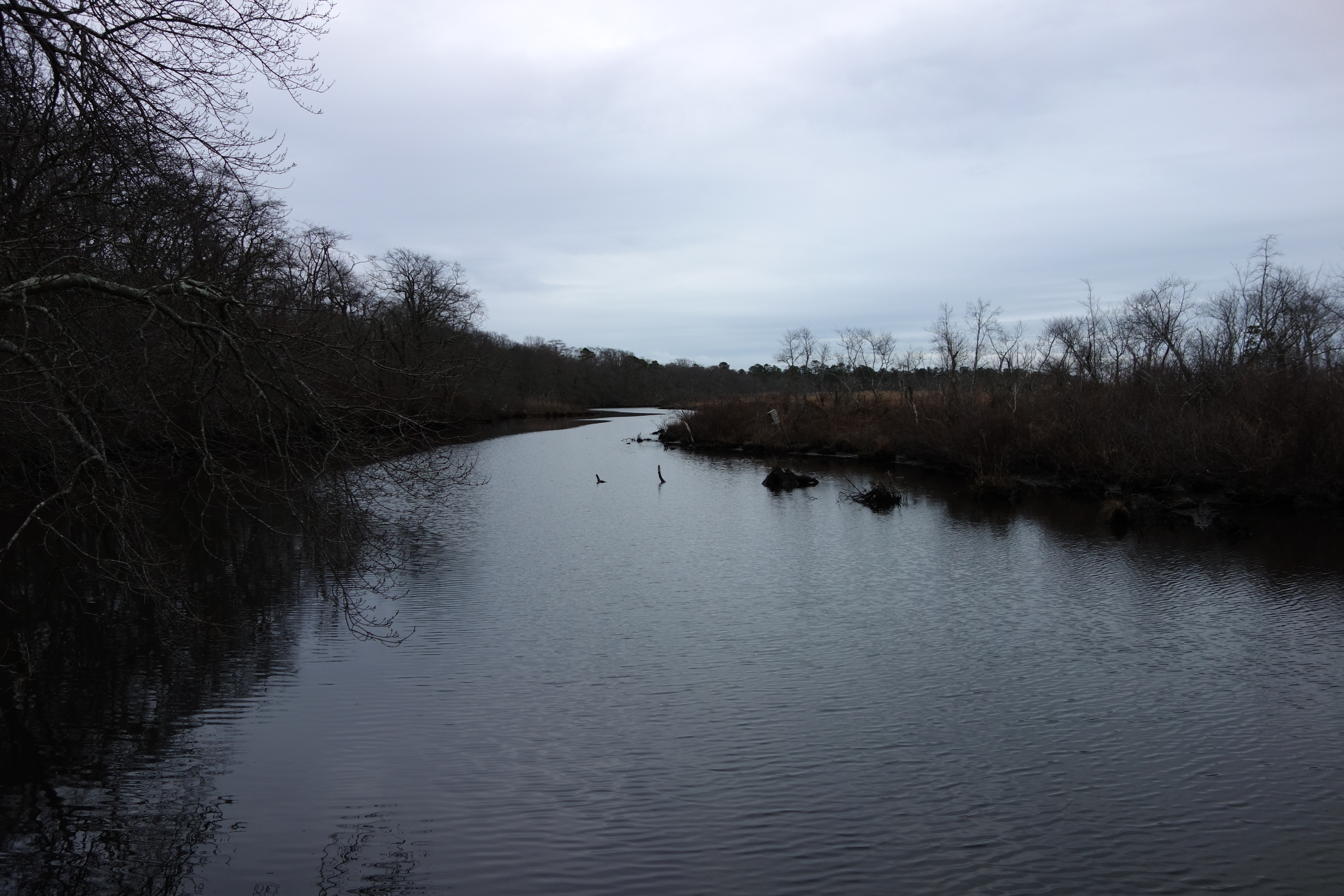
- Carmans River Estuary as it flows through Wertheim National Wildlife Refuge

- Location within New York Location within the United States
- Location: Long Island, New York
- Nearest city: Shirley / Brookhaven (CDP)
- Coordinates: 40°46′30″N 72°52′29″W
- Area: 2,550 acres (10.3 km^{2})
- Established: 1947
- Governing body: U.S. Fish and Wildlife Service
- Website: Wertheim National Wildlife Refuge

The Wertheim National Wildlife Refuge is located on the south shore of Long Island and is one of the undeveloped estuary systems on Long Island. In 1947, Maurice Wertheim donated 2,000 acres (8.1 km^{2}) on eastern Long Island to the United States government; the donated land subsequently became the Wertheim National Wildlife Refuge. The refuge's purpose is to protect the Carmans River Estuary for migratory birds. Wertheim hosts a variety of habitats including oak-pine woodlands, grasslands, and fresh, brackish and salt water wetlands. These habitats attract and support many types of wildlife including white-tailed deer, osprey, muskrat, fox, turtles, frogs and fish. The refuge also serves as a haven for waterfowl, shorebirds, raptors, and songbirds.

In 2012 the Long Island National Wildlife Refuge Complex opened a new visitor center and headquarters facility in the Wertheim National Wildlife Refuge. The building includes an interactive exhibit hall, environmental education classroom and administrative offices.

== Population ==
The refuge's wildlife populations are mainly diverse. There are about 300 species of birds at the refuge. The refuge winters up to 5,000 waterfowl, most of them being black ducks - a species that is declining. The coastal location also makes this refuge an excellent migration place for shorebirds, raptors and songbirds.
