= Islip Terrace, New York =

Islip Terrace, New York Germantown, New York
- Hamlet and census-designated place
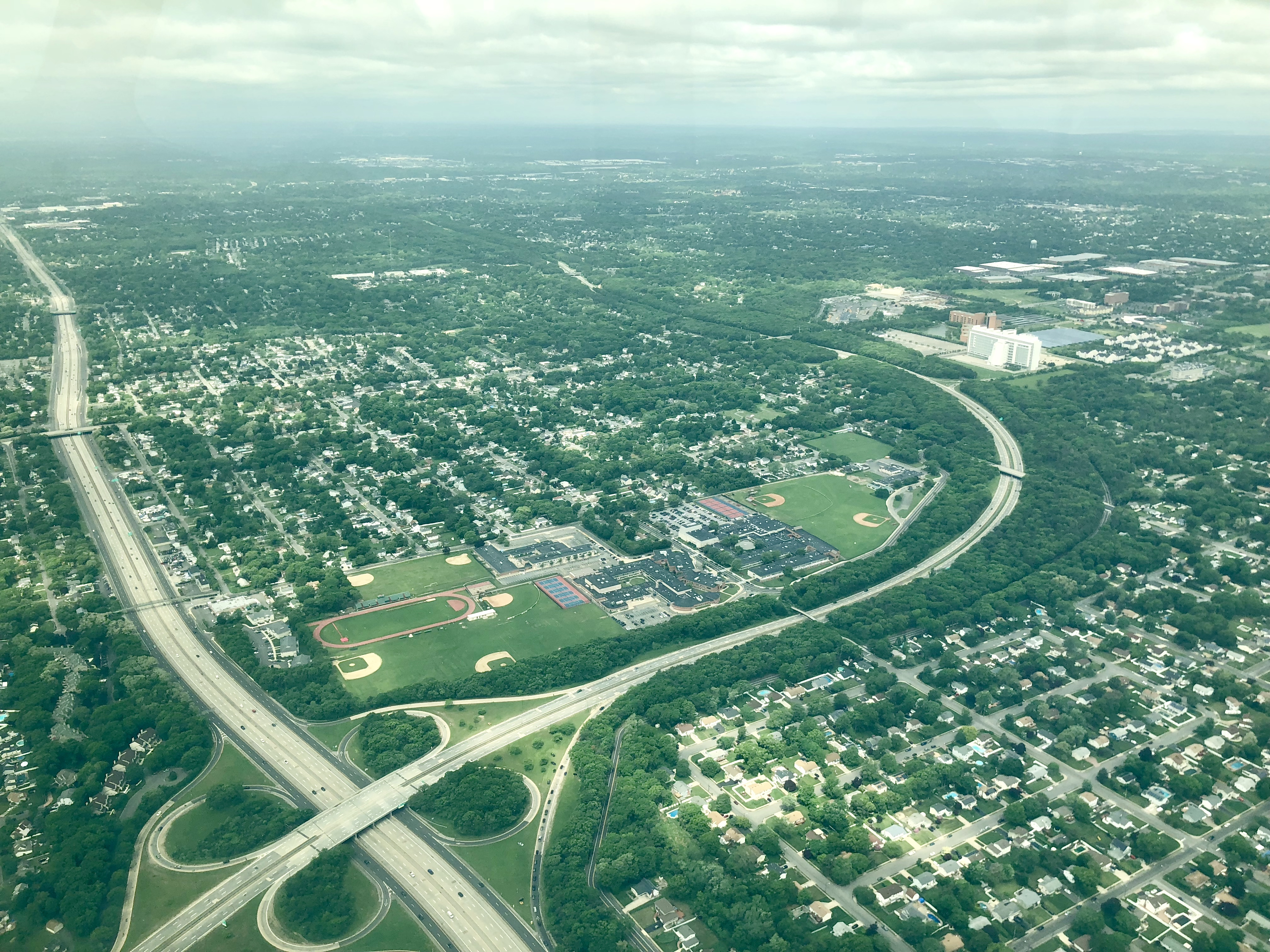
- Islip Terrace, as seen from the air on June 3, 2018.

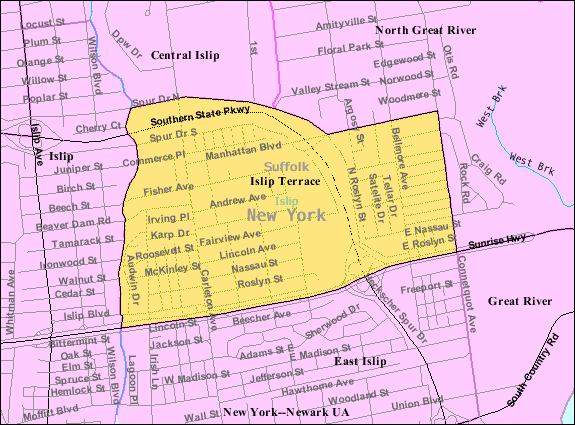
- U.S. Census map

- Location on Long Island Location within the state of New York
- Coordinates: 40°44′55″N 73°11′11″W
- Country: United States
- State: New York
- County: Suffolk
- Town: Islip

Area
  - Total: 1.27 sq mi (3.30 km^{2})
  - Land: 1.27 sq mi (3.30 km^{2})
  - Water: 0 sq mi (0.00 km^{2})
- Elevation: 23 ft (7 m)

Population (2020)
  - Total: 5,323
  - Density: 4,179.7/sq mi (1,613.78/km^{2})
- Time zone: UTC-5 (Eastern (EST))
  - Summer (DST): UTC-4 (EDT)
- ZIP code: 11752
- Area codes: 631, 934
- FIPS code: 36-38022
- GNIS feature ID: 0953844

Islip Terrace (formerly known as Germantown) is a hamlet and census-designated place (CDP) in the Town of Islip in Suffolk County, on the South Shore of Long Island, in New York, United States. The population was 5,323 at the time of the 2020 census.

== History ==
In 1914, a New York City real estate agent developed houses in the woods between East Islip and Central Islip State Hospital. Many who worked in the hospital lived here. The hamlet was originally called Germantown to attract people of German origin, but was renamed Islip Terrace because of German involvement in World War I.

== Geography ==
According to the United States Census Bureau, the CDP has a total area of 1.4 square miles (3.5 km^{2}), all land.

== Demographics ==
Historical population
Census	Pop.	Note	%±
2000	5,641		—
2010	5,389		−4.5%
2020	5,323		−1.2%
U.S. Decennial Census

=== 2020 census ===
As of the 2020 census, Islip Terrace had a population of 5,323. The median age was 40.8 years. 21.0% of residents were under the age of 18 and 13.6% of residents were 65 years of age or older. For every 100 females there were 97.3 males, and for every 100 females age 18 and over there were 95.8 males age 18 and over.

100.0% of residents lived in urban areas, while 0.0% lived in rural areas.

There were 1,698 households in Islip Terrace, of which 37.9% had children under the age of 18 living in them. Of all households, 61.0% were married-couple households, 11.6% were households with a male householder and no spouse or partner present, and 21.9% were households with a female householder and no spouse or partner present. About 14.4% of all households were made up of individuals and 8.0% had someone living alone who was 65 years of age or older.

There were 1,774 housing units, of which 4.3% were vacant. The homeowner vacancy rate was 0.7% and the rental vacancy rate was 3.7%.

Racial composition as of the 2020 census
Race	Number	Percent
White	4,254	79.9%
Black or African American	166	3.1%
American Indian and Alaska Native	21	0.4%
Asian	151	2.8%
Native Hawaiian and Other Pacific Islander	3	0.1%
Some other race	264	5.0%
Two or more races	464	8.7%
Hispanic or Latino (of any race)	836	15.7%

=== 2000 census ===
As of the census of 2000, there were 5,641 people, 1,755 households, and 1,463 families residing in the CDP. The population density was 3,985.3 inhabitants per square mile (1,538.7/km^{2}). There were 1,784 housing units at an average density of 1,260.4 per square mile (486.6/km^{2}). The racial makeup of the CDP was 95.82% White, 0.50% African American, 0.04% Native American, 1.49% Asian, 1.08% from other races, and 1.08% from two or more races. Hispanic or Latino of any race were 6.61% of the population.

There were 1,755 households, out of which 43.6% had children under the age of 18 living with them, 67.6% were married couples living together, 11.5% had a female householder with no husband present, and 16.6% were non-families. 13.2% of all households were made up of individuals, and 4.4% had someone living alone who was 65 years of age or older. The average household size was 3.21 and the average family size was 3.51.

In the CDP, the population was spread out, with 29.5% under the age of 18, 6.7% from 18 to 24, 33.6% from 25 to 44, 20.6% from 45 to 64, and 9.6% who were 65 years of age or older. The median age was 35 years. For every 100 females, there were 96.9 males. For every 100 females age 18 and over, there were 93.6 males.

The median income for a household in the CDP was $66,644, and the median income for a family was $69,389. Males had a median income of $51,036 versus $30,714 for females. The per capita income for the CDP was $23,269. About 1.7% of families and 2.4% of the population were below the poverty line, including 2.1% of those under age 18 and 3.1% of those age 65 or over.

== Education ==
Islip Terrace, in its entirety, is served by the East Islip Union Free School District. As such, all children who reside within Islip Terrace and attend public schools go to East Islip schools.

Additionally, East Islip High School is located within the hamlet.

East Islip High School is a public high school, serving approximately 2,000 students in grades 9 through 12 from the hamlets of East Islip, Great River and Islip Terrace. The school's athletic teams previously competed as the Remden before changing the mascot to comply with state regulations.

The school offers an athletic program that includes football, bowling, baseball, softball and lacrosse. Several teams, including football - highlighted by a championship season in 2007 - as well as baseball, softball, bowling, have frequently ranked among the top programs in Long Island.

== Parks and recreation ==
Beaver Dam Park is located within Islip Terrace.

== Transportation ==
=== Roads ===
Major roads within the hamlet of Islip Terrace are:

- NY 27, also known as Sunrise Highway (Exit 46N)
- Heckscher State Parkway (Exit 43A,43W,43E)
- CR 17Suffolk County Route 17, also known as Carleton Avenue, runs parallel to NY Route 111 (Islip Avenue) from its southern terminus at NY 27A in Islip to its northern terminus at NY 111 near the Long Island Expressway in Hauppauge.

=== Airport ===
Islip Terrace is approximately 6 miles (9.7 km) from Long Island MacArthur Airport in Ronkonkoma.

=== Train ===
No railroad lines run through Islip Terrace. The closest stations to the hamlet are the 1897-established Great River Station along the Long Island Rail Road Montauk Branch, originally built by the South Side Railroad of Long Island until 1876. and the nearby 1868-built Islip Station which is also on the Montauk Branch of the railroad.

=== Buses ===
There are many bus stops in Islip Terrace, mostly along branches of the 17 route. Buses are operated and maintained by the local Suffolk Transportation Service, Inc.
