= New York State Route 454 =

Highway on Long Island, New York

New York State Route 454
- Suffolk County Veterans Memorial Highway
- Map of western Suffolk County with NY 454 highlighted in red

Route information
- Maintained by NYSDOT
- Length: 13.67 mi (22.00 km)
- Existed: March 29, 1972–present

Major junctions
- West end: NY 25 in Commack
- Sunken Meadow State Parkway in Commack; Northern State Parkway in Hauppauge; NY 347 in Hauppauge; I-495 in Islandia
- East end: NY 27 / CR 97 at the Holbrook–Bayport line

Location
- Country: United States
- State: New York
- Counties: Suffolk

Highway system
- New York Highways; Interstate; US; State; Reference; Parkways
← NY 448	→ NY 456

New York State Route 454 (NY 454), also known as the Suffolk County Veterans Memorial Highway or simply Vets Highway, is a 13.67-mile (22.00 km) east–west state highway in western and central Suffolk County on Long Island in New York. It spans from NY 25 (Jericho Turnpike) in Commack to NY 27 (Sunrise Highway) in Holbrook. The route provides access to the Long Island MacArthur Airport, as well as New York State and Suffolk County government offices, and at one time the Long Island Arena. NY 454 serves as the northern terminus for the Northern State Parkway in Hauppauge, where a concurrency with NY 347 begins.

The origins of NY 454 dates back to the late 1940s when a new freeway was constructed from Commack to Holbrook for $1.4 million ($18.9 million in 2025). This new freeway was designated as a memorial for Suffolk County War Veterans. The route was designed and constructed by the Suffolk County Department of Public Works under watch and aid from the New York State Department of Public Works and the United States government. Upon completion in January 1950, the route was designated as County Route 76 (CR 76) west of Town Line Road and CR 78 southeast of Town Line Road until 1968 when the entire highway was designated CR 78. In 1972, the state took over control of the new highway and designated it NY 454. Recently, there have been plans to expand the highway and the concurrency with Route 347 with new travel lanes and a new interchange being built between the two highways.

== Route description ==
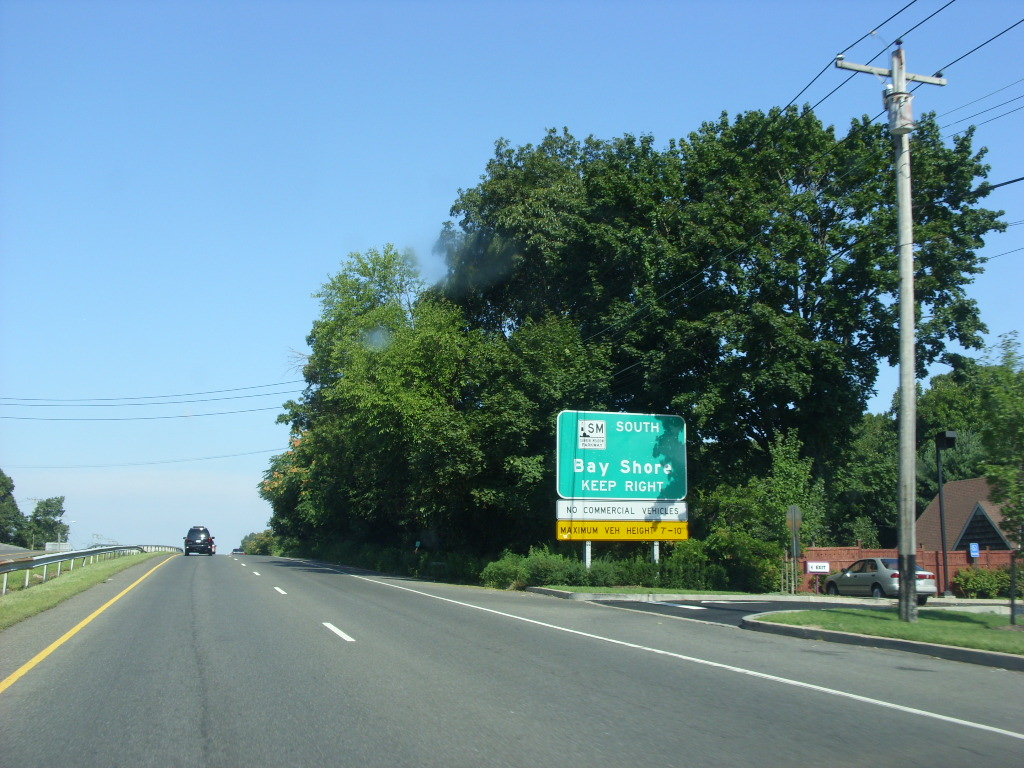
NY 454 approaching the Sunken Meadow State Parkway in Commack

NY 454 begins at a fork along NY 25 (Jericho Turnpike) in Commack. The route heads southeastward as the four-lane Veterans Memorial Highway, passing through a large commercial district built up around NY 454's interchange with the Sunken Meadow State Parkway (exit SM2). From there, NY 454 continues eastward through a residential district for several miles and passes to the south of Whitman Hollow Park. The arterial road continues southeastward through local residential areas with four lanes before meeting NY 347 and the Northern State Parkway at an interchange in Hauppauge. The junction serves as the western terminus of NY 347 and the eastern terminus of the Northern Parkway. NY 347 and NY 454 become concurrent, crossing through Hauppauge and residential properties for the next two miles (3.2 km), intersecting with local roads. After bending around Forestwood Park, Routes 454 and 347 follow the town line and pass the Stoubrough Golf Course, where NY 347 forks to the northeast.

From there, NY 454 turns to the southeast, intersecting with NY 111 (Wheeler Road) and narrowing to two lanes. After turning further to the south, the highway intersects with CR 67, the former alignment of the Long Island Motor Parkway. Here, NY 454 returns to four lanes and meets the Long Island Expressway (Interstate 495) and its frontage roads. The route enters the village of Islandia and enters a large commercial district, where the route intersects with CR 100 (Old Nichols Road). After crossing the Long Island Rail Road, NY 454 enters Connetquot River State Park, bends to the east and traverses the park. Crossing over the Connetquot River, the arterial road crosses a hiking trail and soon leaves the park.

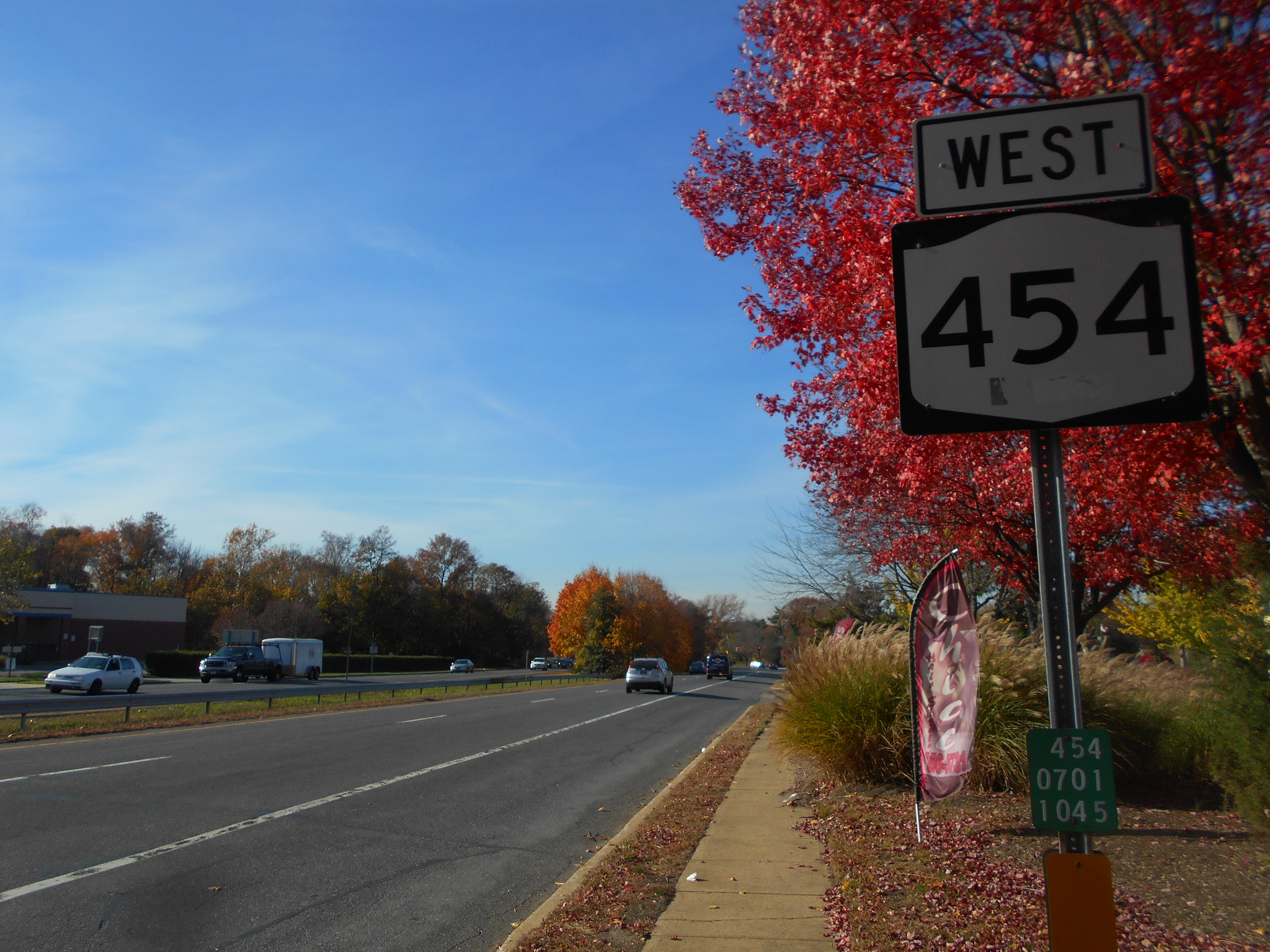
NY 454 westbound between NY 111 and NY 347 in Hauppauge

NY 454 continues as a four-lane arterial road through a large commercial district, intersecting with CR 93 (Lakeland Avenue). There, the highway passes Long Island MacArthur Airport and bends to the east through another large commercial district remaining unchanged for several miles. The route turns to the southeast at Coates Avenue as a four-lane arterial road for the last two miles (3.2 km) of NY 454. About three miles (4.8 km) from Lakeland Avenue, NY 454 connects to the Sunrise Highway (NY 27) at exit 51, a partial interchange in Holbrook. Here, the NY 454 designation ends and its right-of-way merges into the eastbound service road of NY 27. There is no access to westbound Sunrise Highway from NY 454 itself; instead, the connection is made by way of nearby Broadway Avenue.

== History ==
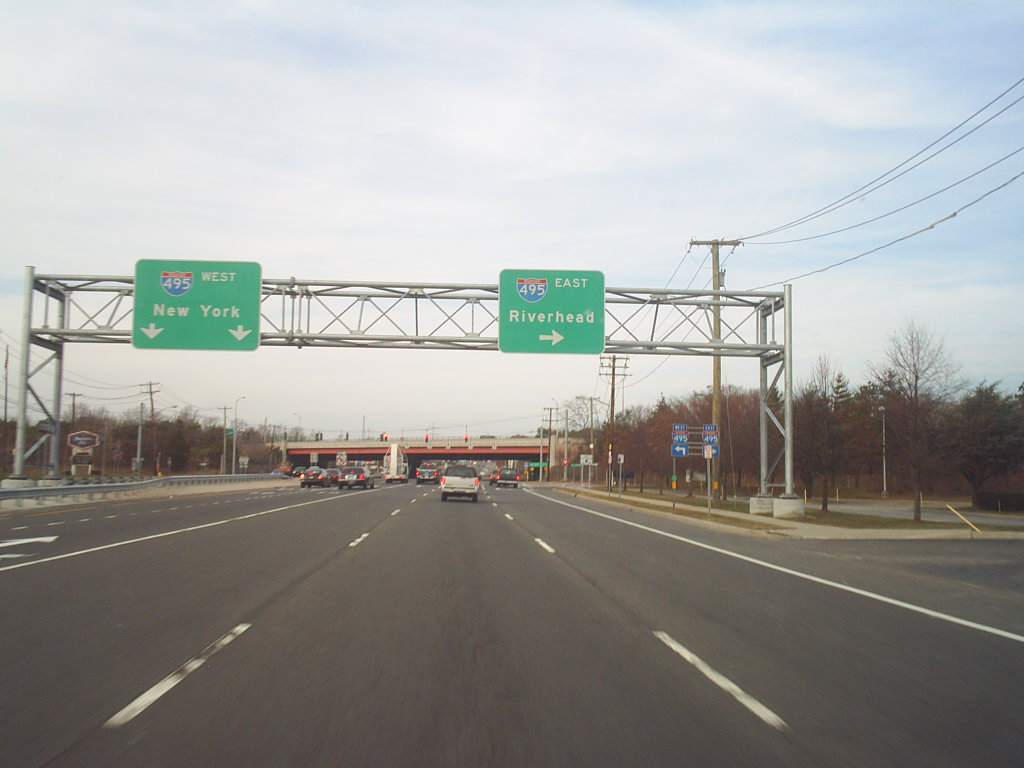
NY 454 in Islip approaching the Long Island Expressway (I-495)

Construction first began in 1948 for a new freeway from Commack to Holbrook by the Suffolk County Department of Public Works. The $1.4 million (1949 USD) project was funded by federal aid and was designated as a new memorial for the war veterans. People had been arguing since 1947 to get a new county-funded war veteran memorial installed in Suffolk, including a number of other suggested projects such as trees at a park in Yaphank to a new general-use hospital. On April 30, 1949, the sides came to agreement to name the new highway for the war veterans, and two agencies were hired to come up with a name. The design for the freeway between Commack and Holbrook included a 145-foot-wide (44 m) right-of-way, and the road was constructed under the supervision of the New York State Department of Public Works.

Construction continued throughout 1949, with the new Veterans Memorial Highway opening on January 25, 1950. The new 13.62-mile (21.92 km) highway was designated as CR 76 for 4.18 miles (6.73 km) through Smithtown and CR 78 for the remaining 9.44 miles (15.19 km) in the town of Islip. The new freeway's wide right-of-way was built with room for additional lanes if the situation became necessary. Although the state of New York and the federal government both helped aid the project, the control of the new highway was turned over to the Suffolk County Superintendent of Highways. In March 1968, CR 76 was truncated to begin at NY 347 while CR 78 was extended northwestward over CR 76's former routing to NY 25 in Commack.

In 1970, the Nassau–Suffolk Regional Planning Board brought up plans to convert CR 78 into a six-lane expressway with new service roads. A similar project was planned for the nearby four-lane NY 347 through Islip. To aid this, ownership and maintenance of CR 78 was transferred to the New York State Department of Transportation on March 29, 1972, receiving the designation of NY 454. The state immediately expanded NY 454 to six lanes, with three in each direction from Holbrook to the terminus of NY 347. In 1977, the state designated the portion of the highway in Hauppague as both NY 454 and NY 347 after it became clear that the Hauppauge Spur of the Long Island Expressway would not be constructed. The plans to expand NY 454 and NY 347 into full-blown freeways were discarded by the 1980s.

During the 1990s, the Department of Transportation looked into the expansion of NY 347 and NY 454. The studies suggested that the state would add one additional traffic lane in each direction, giving most of the highway six lanes with eight travel lanes along the concurrency in Hauppauge. The new lanes would also be capable of holding rapid-commute vehicles for the Long Island Rapid Commute. The interchange where Routes 347 and 454 fork in Hauppague is slated to go from an at-grade fork to a grade-separated interchange. The project, which will cost $359 million (2009 USD) was scheduled to be completed between 2012 and 2015.

== Major intersections ==
The entire route is in Suffolk County.

Location	mi	km	Destinations	Notes
Commack	0.00	0.00	NY 25 (Jericho Turnpike) – South Huntington, Smithtown	Western terminus
Commack	0.53	0.85	Sunken Meadow State Parkway south – Bay Shore	Exit SM2 on Sunken Meadow Parkway
Hauppauge	2.19	3.52	Northern State Parkway west – New York NY 347 begins	Interchange; no westbound entrance; western terminus of NY 347; eastern terminus of Northern Parkway
Hauppauge	4.38	7.05	NY 347 east – Port Jefferson	No eastbound entrance; eastern end of NY 347 concurrency
Hauppauge	4.62	7.44	NY 111 – Islip, Smithtown	
Islandia	6.10	9.82	I-495 – New York, Riverhead	Exit 57 on I-495
Ronkonkoma–Bohemia line	10.51	16.91	CR 93 (Lakeland Avenue) to NY 27 west	
Ronkonkoma–Bohemia line	11.32	18.22	Johnson Avenue (CR 112) – MacArthur Airport	
Holbrook	13.18	21.21	Broadway Avenue (CR 18) to NY 27 west – New York	
Holbrook–Bayport line	13.67	22.00	NY 27 east (Sunrise Highway) / CR 97 (Nicolls Road) – Montauk	Interchange; eastern terminus; exit 51 on NY 27
1.000 mi = 1.609 km; 1.000 km = 0.621 mi: Concurrency terminus; Incomplete access

== See also ==
- List of county routes in Suffolk County, New York
