= Heckscher State Parkway =

Highway on Long Island, New York

Heckscher State Parkway
- Heckscher State Parkway highlighted in red

Route information
- Maintained by NYSDOT and NYS OPRHP
- Length: 8.24 mi (13.26 km)
- Existed: 1929–present
- History: Opened 1929 south of NY 27A; completed November 3, 1962
- Restrictions: No commercial vehicles

Major junctions
- West end: Southern State Parkway / Sagtikos State Parkway in West Islip
- NY 111 in Islip; NY 27 at the Islip Terrace–East Islip line NY 27A in East Islip
- South end: Heckscher State Park in Great River

Location
- Country: United States
- State: New York
- Counties: Suffolk

Highway system
- New York Highways; Interstate; US; State; Reference; Parkways

The Heckscher State Parkway (formerly known as the Heckscher Spur) is an 8.24-mile (13.26 km) controlled-access parkway on Long Island, New York, in the United States. The parkway is located entirely within the Suffolk County town of Islip. Although it officially begins at the south end of the Sagtikos State Parkway in West Islip, it remains signed as the Southern State Parkway until it intersects with NY 27 (Sunrise Highway) in Islip Terrace. The section signed as the Southern State Parkway proceeds east as a six-lane parkway through Brentwood and Central Islip, loosely paralleling New York State Route 27 (NY 27). At Islip Terrace, the Heckscher Parkway turns southward, crossing NY 27 where it becomes signed as the Heckscher State Parkway. The parkway comprises the eastern portion of New York State Route 908M (NY 908M), an unsigned reference route, with the Southern State Parkway occupying the western section. In order to avoid confusion, the parkway is signed as an extension of the Southern State Parkway west of the NY 27 interchange (exit 44).

The parkway was originally built in 1929 as a connector between NY 27A and the newly opened Heckscher (formerly Deer Range) State Park. In 1959, bids were announced for a new Heckscher State Parkway, which would connect the original road to the Sagtikos State Parkway. This section was officially opened on November 3, 1962, with a ceremony featuring speeches by Robert Moses and Governor Nelson Rockefeller. The Long Island Transportation Plan 2000, a long-term study done in the late 1990s, called for the Heckscher Parkway to be widened west of NY 27 to accommodate a carpool and bus lane.

== Route description ==
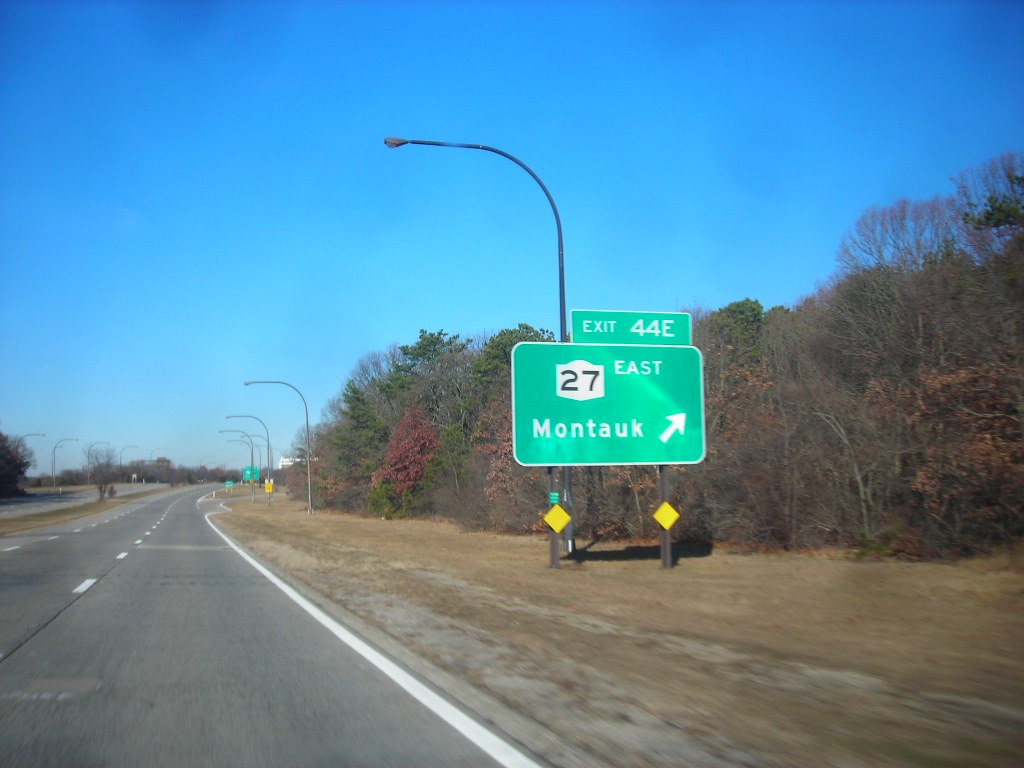
Heckscher State Parkway at exit 44E, NY 27 east toward Montauk

The Heckscher State Parkway begins at an interchange with the southern terminus of the Sagtikos State Parkway in the hamlet of West Islip on Long Island. The junction is signed as exit 41A on the Heckscher Parkway and the Southern State Parkway, the Heckscher Parkway's westward continuation toward New York City. Past the interchange, the Heckscher Parkway heads east as a six-lane divided highway, passing through residential areas in West Islip and the North Bay Shore section of town of Islip. It soon enters exit 42, a cloverleaf interchange with County Route 13 (CR 13, named Fifth Avenue). Half of the junction's ramps directly connect to CR 13 while the others use one of the parkway's two service roads, named Spur Drive South and Spur Drive North. After the interchange, the parkway continues generally eastward through Brentwood, running past dense woods buffering the highway from more developed areas.

Brentwood eventually gives way to Islip Terrace, where the parkway enters another cloverleaf interchange, exit 43 for NY 111 (Islip Avenue). Exit 43A, a junction for CR 17 (Carleton Avenue), follows shortly afterward. After exit 43A, the Heckscher State Parkway makes a gradual bend to the southeast toward exit 44, a cloverleaf interchange with NY 27 (Sunrise Highway). The two service roads flanking the Heckscher Parkway end just north of the junction, with both feeding into local streets adjacent to the parkway. Past Sunrise Highway, the Heckscher State Parkway enters East Islip, crossing over Long Island Rail Road's Montauk Branch at a point just west of the Great River station. On the other side of the tracks, the parkway begins to run along the western edge of Bayard Cutting Arboretum State Park while crossing over CR 50 (Union Boulevard). The CR 50 overpass is located just north of exit 45, a cloverleaf interchange serving NY 27A (Montauk Highway). South of here, the Heckscher narrows from six to four lanes as it heads into Great River. Here, the road passes alongside residential neighborhoods while slowly curving to the south toward Heckscher State Park. The parkway intersects Timber Point Road at exit 46 before ending shortly afterward at the tollbooth for Heckscher State Park. While the parkway designation ends here, the highway's right-of-way continues southwest into the park, 8.52 miles (13.71 km) from the Southern State.

== History ==
Heckscher State Park, formerly known as Deer Range State Park, dates back to 1925. At that time, the construction of the Northern State Parkway was opposed by area residents as they believed it would hurt their ability to hunt foxes in the area. Their representatives in the New York State Legislature refused to provide money for a park, leading a group to contact August Heckscher, a local philanthropist. He donated $262,000 (1929 USD) to the Long Island State Park Commission (LISPC) and got land appropriated for a new park, which became Deer Range State Park. On June 2, 1929, the park was rededicated in the name of August Heckscher. Former Governor Alfred E. Smith, LISPC chairman and highway designer Robert Moses, and Heckscher all made remarks at a ceremony for the name change, and Heckscher was presented with a bronze tablet honoring his work. Heckscher died in April 1941.

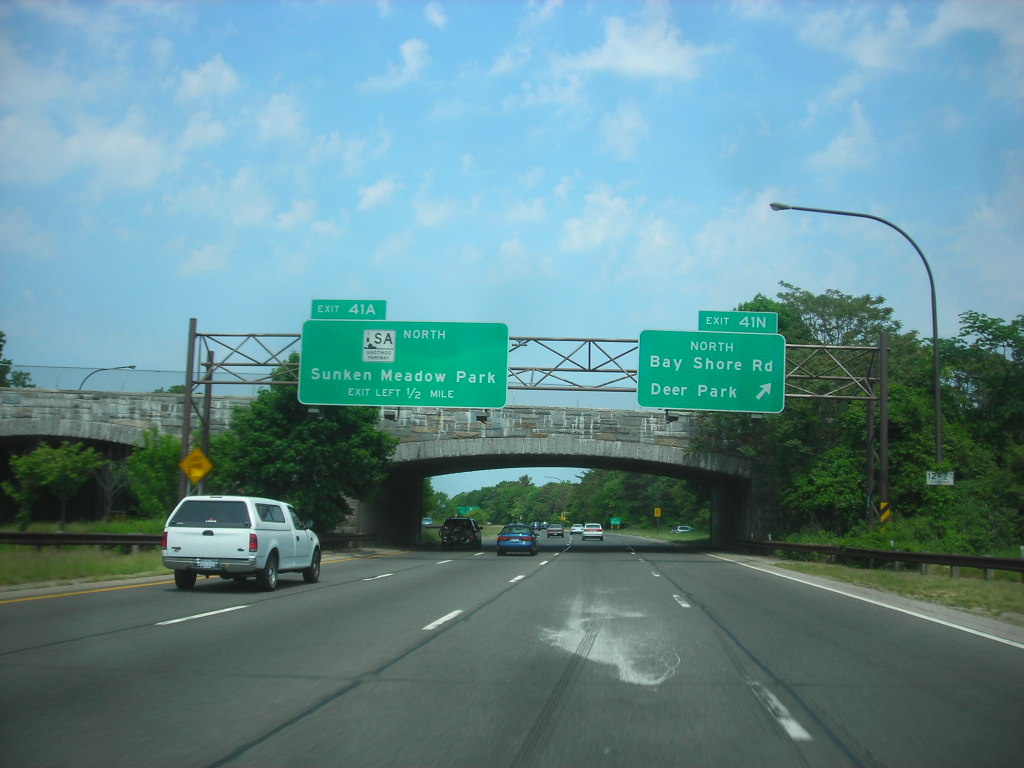
Exit 41 of the Southern State Parkway, which was built to support connections with the proposed Heckscher State Parkway

A two-lane highway providing access from NY 27A to Heckscher State Park was constructed in 1929. This highway became the basis for what eventually became the Heckscher State Parkway. Plans for the parkway called for it to extend northwest to a junction at Bay Shore Road in West Islip, where the Heckscher, Southern, Sagitkos and Captree Parkway (now the Robert Moses Causeway) would meet. Thus, when the extension of the Southern State Parkway opened in November 1949, the junction was built to accommodate the proposed Heckscher Parkway. In 1952, the state acquired the W. Bayard Cutting estate in Great River. Projections made at this time called for the Heckscher Parkway to be constructed by 1954 so the Cutting land could be turned into an arboretum.

Work on the road was delayed until March 1959 when bids were finally announced by the State of New York Department of Public Works to construct the last 6.27 miles (10.09 km) section of the Heckscher State Parkway from the Sagtikos State Parkway to NY 27A. This, along with a widening of the Southern State Parkway, would fill the gaps in the original 200-mile (320 km) parkway system proposed by Robert Moses. The estimated cost of construction was $8,327,000 (1959 USD), and the road was slated to be completed in September 1960. An additional two years were ultimately needed to finish the highway, and LISPC announced on November 1, 1962, that the parkway would open on the upcoming Saturday (November 3) with a ceremony featuring Robert Moses and Governor Nelson Rockefeller.

On the morning of November 3, the Heckscher State Parkway's full alignment was opened to traffic in rainy conditions. A motorcade of 110 vehicles followed the new parkway to the Bayard Cutting Arboretum, but Governor Rockfeller was late due to mechanical difficulties with his personal plane. The new parkway led to the expansion of facilities along the road, which included an additional 1,658 acres (671 ha) of land and 18,000 feet (5,500 m) of new beachfront. Opening the parkway also created connections to the nearby Southside Sportsmen's Club, which would be turned into a recreation area, and the Bayard Cutting Arboretum. A new set of trees were planted along the parkway in 1963. LISPC was to plant 67,000 trees, shrubs and ground cover along the new parkway and several others on Long Island. Evergreen trees, Japanese crab, cherry, mimosa, magnolia, forsythia and laurel plants were among those planted.

From 1997–2001, engineers at Parsons Brinckerhoff worked on "Long Island Transportation Plan 2000", a $6.5 million (2001 USD) study focused on improving Long Island's transportation system by 2020. The study's findings included 130 miles (210 km) of road widening. One widening proposal would give the Heckscher Parkway an extra restricted-access lane for buses and carpooling drivers between the Sagtikos State Parkway and NY 27. The added lane would be part of a 60-mile (97 km) system of restricted-access lanes across Long Island.

== Exit list ==
Exit numbers continue sequentially from those of the Southern State Parkway. The entire route is in Suffolk County.

Location	mi	km	Exit	Destinations	Notes
West Islip	0.00	0.00	–	Southern State Parkway west – New York	Continuation west
West Islip	0.00	0.00	41A	Sagtikos State Parkway north – Kings Park	Southern terminus and exit S4 on Sagtikos State Parkway
North Bay Shore	0.99	1.59	42	CR 13 (Fifth Avenue) – Brentwood, Bay Shore	Signed as exits 42S (south) and 42N (north)
Community of Islip	3.97	6.39	43S-N	NY 111 – Islip, Hauppauge	Signed as exits 43S (south) and 43N (north)
Central Islip–Islip Terrace line	4.68	7.53	43A	CR 17 – East Islip, Central Islip	Access via Spur Drive; serves Cohalan Court Complex and Bethpage Ballpark; former NY 111
Islip Terrace–East Islip line	6.00	9.66	44	To NY 27 west – New York NY 27 east – Montauk	Signed as exits 44W (west) and 44E (east); exit 46 on NY 27
East Islip	6.76	10.88	45	NY 27A – East Islip, Eastern Long Island	Signed as exits 45W (west) and 45E (east); former NY 27
Great River	8.08	13.00	46	Timber Point Road – East Islip, Great River	Southbound exit and northbound entrance
Great River	8.24	13.26		Heckscher State Park	Southern terminus; toll booths
1.000 mi = 1.609 km; 1.000 km = 0.621 mi: Incomplete access; Tolled
