= Long Island Motor Parkway =

Former highway on Long Island, New York

- U.S. National Register of Historic Places
- U.S. Historic district
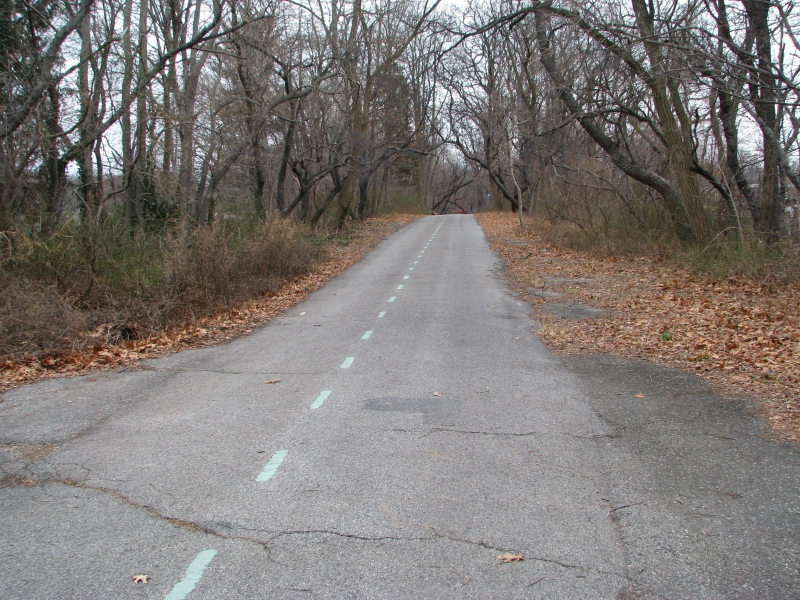
- Remnant of Long Island Motor Parkway c. 2008 at Springfield Boulevard in Queens, looking east

- Location within New York City Location within New York Location within the United States
- Location: Roughly Alley Pond and Cunningham Parks, between Winchester Blvd. and Clearview Expressway, between 73rd Ave. and Peck Ave., Queens, New York City (historic district only)
- Coordinates: 40°44′13″N 73°45′35″W
- Area: 10 acres (4.0 ha) (historic district only)
- Built: October 10, 1908; 118 years ago
- Architect: E.G. Williams; E.H. Brown
- NRHP reference No.: 02000301
- Added to NRHP: April 1, 2002

The Long Island Motor Parkway, also known as the Vanderbilt Parkway, Vanderbilt Motor Parkway, or Motor Parkway, was a limited-access parkway on Long Island, New York, United States. It was the first highway designed for automobile use only. The parkway was privately built by William Kissam Vanderbilt II with overpasses and bridges to remove most intersections. It officially opened on October 10, 1908. It closed in 1938 when it was taken over by the state of New York in lieu of back taxes. Parts of the parkway survive today, used as sections of other roads or as a bicycle trail.

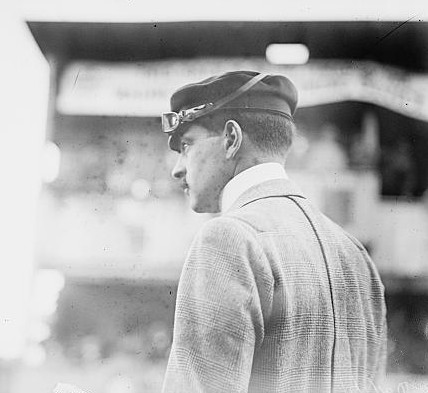
William K. Vanderbilt II, who privately built the parkway

== Origins and construction ==
William Kissam Vanderbilt II, the great-grandson of Cornelius Vanderbilt, was an auto-racing enthusiast and created the Vanderbilt Cup, the first major road racing competition, in 1904. He ran the races on local roads in Nassau County during the first decade of the 20th century, but the deaths of two spectators and injury to many others showed the need to eliminate racing on residential streets. Vanderbilt responded by establishing a company to build a graded, banked and grade-separated highway suitable for racing that was also free of the horse manure dust often churned up by motor cars. The resulting Long Island Motor Parkway, with its banked turns, guard rails, reinforced concrete roadbed, and limited-access, was the first limited-access highway in the world.

The road was originally planned to stretch for 70 miles (110 km) in and out of New York City as far as Riverhead, the county seat of Suffolk County and point of division for the north and south forks of Long Island. Only 45 miles (72 km) (from Queens in New York City to Lake Ronkonkoma) were constructed, at a cost of $6 million. Construction began in June 1908 (a year after the Bronx River Parkway). On October 10, 1908, a 10-mile-long (16 km) section opened as far as modern Bethpage. It hosted races in 1908 and on the full road in 1909 and 1910, but an accident in the 1910 Vanderbilt Cup, killing two riding mechanics with additional injuries, caused the New York Legislature to ban racing except on race tracks, ending its career as a racing road.

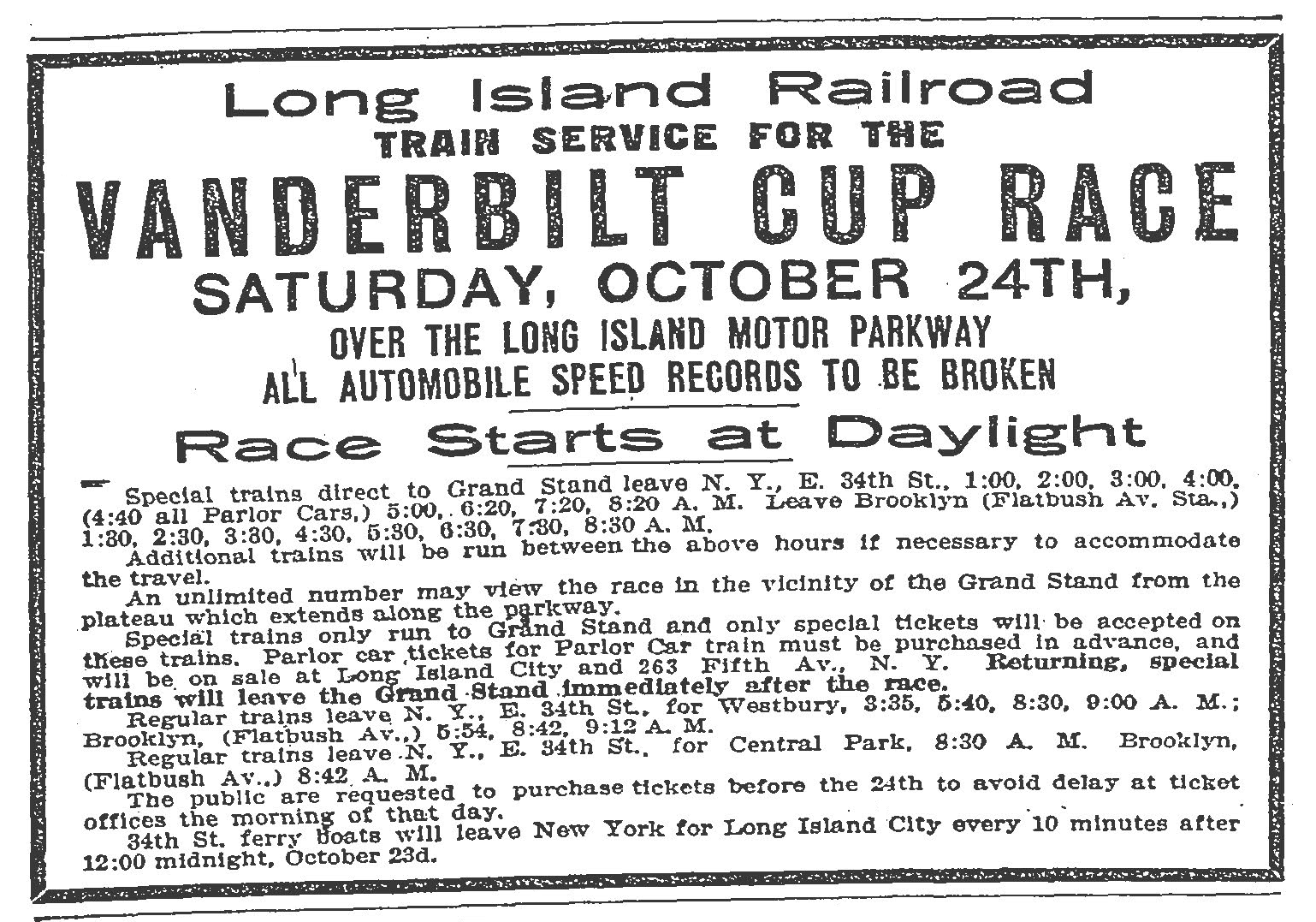
Advertisement in The New York Times, October 18, 1908.

By 1911, the road was extended to Lake Ronkonkoma. Its western stretch was also extended from Great Neck to what is now Fresh Meadows. The Long Island Motor Parkway was the first road designed exclusively for automobile use, the first concrete highway in the United States, and the first to use overpasses and bridges to eliminate intersections.

=== AAA Champ Car venue ===
The parkway was used for four American Automobile Association Contest Board Champ Car races. The first one was held on October 30, 1909, and was won by Harry Grant. Three races were held on October 10, 1910, in front of a crowd estimated at 300,000 people. Grant won the main 22-lap event. A 15-lap event was won by Frank Gelnaw, and Bill Endicott won a 10-lap event.

Date	Winner	Laps
October 30, 1909	Harry Grant	22
October 1, 1910	Harry Grant	22
October 1, 1910	Frank Gelnaw	15
October 1, 1910	Bill Endicott	10

== Access ==
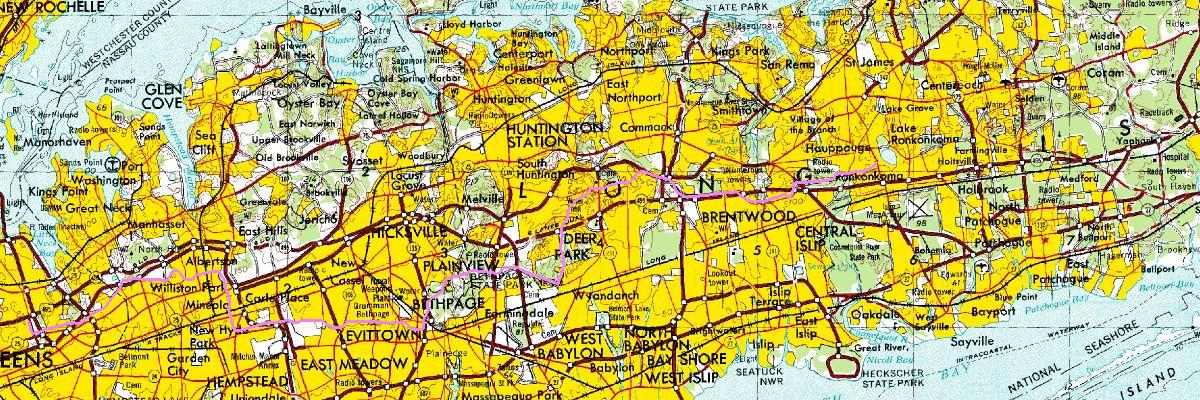
Map showing the Long Island Motor Parkway (in purple)

The Long Island Motor Parkway was a limited-access toll road, with access at a small number of toll booths, joined to local roads by short connector roads. Traffic could turn left between the parkway and connectors, crossing oncoming traffic, so it was not a controlled-access highway (or "freeway" as later defined by the federal government's Manual on Uniform Traffic Control Devices). Access points were:

- Nassau Boulevard (NY 25D) west of Francis Lewis Boulevard. The right-of-way of Nassau Boulevard was later used for the Long Island Expressway (I-495).
- Hillside Avenue (NY 25B) – Springfield Boulevard south of 77th Avenue
- Great Neck – Lakeville Road south of Lake Road
- Roslyn – Roslyn Road south of Barnyard Lane
- Mineola – Jericho Turnpike (NY 25) at Rudolph Drive
- Garden City – Clinton Road at Vanderbilt Court
- Meadowbrook – Merrick Avenue north of Stewart Avenue
- Bethpage – Hicksville Road (NY 107) south of Avoca Avenue; Round Swamp Road south of Old Bethpage Road
- Melville – Broad Hollow Road (NY 110) north of Spagnoli Road
- Deer Park – Deer Park Road (NY 231)
- East Commack – Commack Spur along Harned Road (CR 14) to Jericho Turnpike (NY 25)
- Brentwood – Washington Avenue
- Ronkonkoma – Rosevale Avenue

When the parkway opened, the toll was set at $2. It was reduced to $1.50 in 1912, $1 in 1917, and 40 cents in 1938. The first six toll houses were designed by architect John Russell Pope, designer of the Jefferson Memorial and the rotunda in the American Museum of Natural History. The toll houses were designed to include living space for the toll collectors so that toll could be collected at all hours. The most prominent remaining toll house is in Garden City. Once located at the junction of Clinton Road and Vanderbilt Court, it was moved in 1989 to 230 Seventh Street, now the headquarters of the Garden City Chamber of Commerce.

== Demise ==
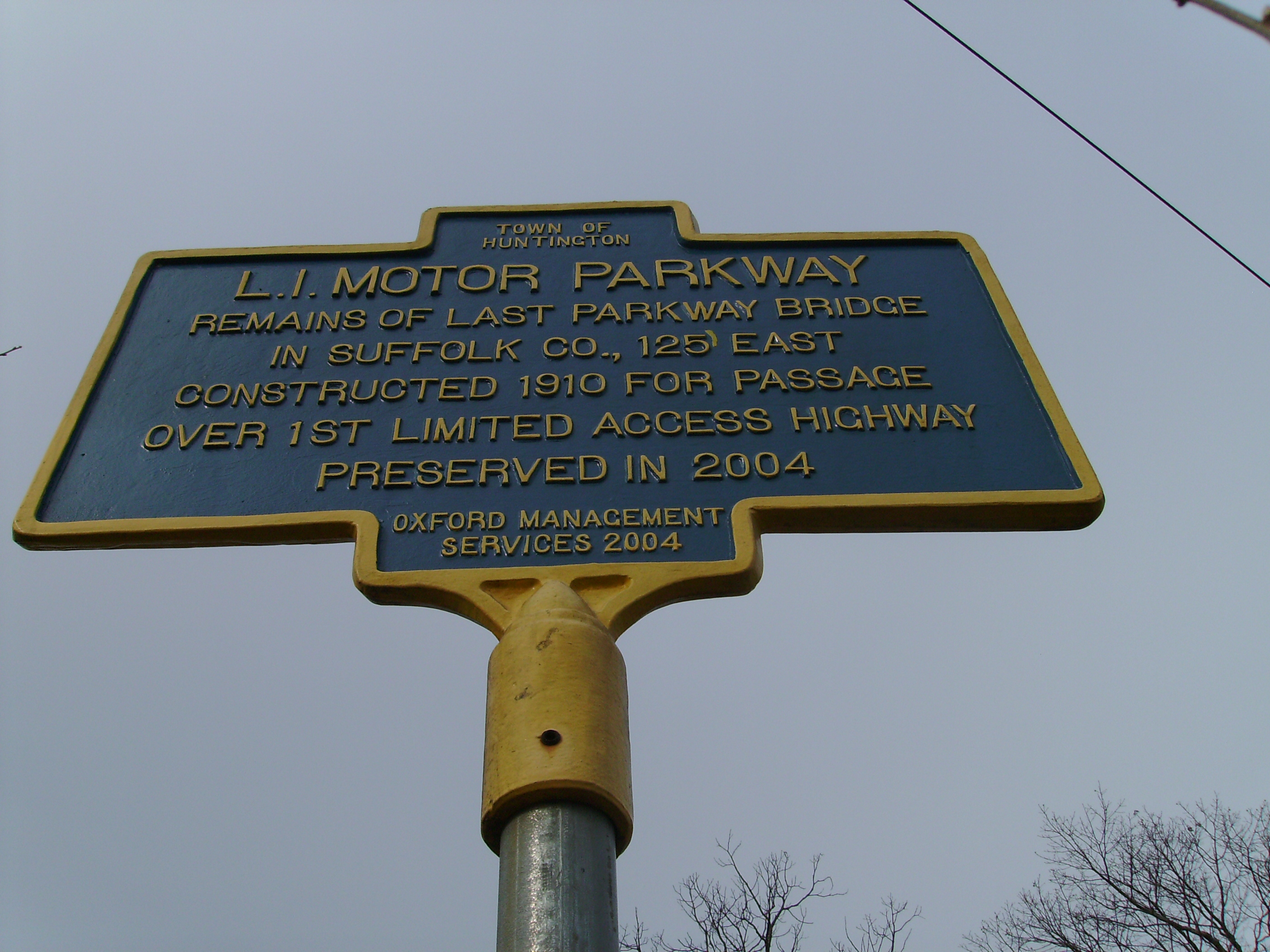
Historical marker for the Long Island Motor Parkway in Melville.

Roadway design advances of the 1920s rendered the road obsolete less than 20 years after construction. At the same time Robert Moses was planning the Northern State Parkway. In 1929, the owners and some Long Island officials proposed that the New York State government should buy the road and integrate it into the state parkway system, despite its narrow roadway (varying from 16 to 22 feet (4.9 to 6.7 m) wide) and steep bridges not meeting new standards. Moses opposed the idea, stating that the Long Island Motor Parkway had been "a white elephant for the last twenty years" and that it would need significant reconstruction to integrate it into the state parkway system.

The completion of the Northern State Parkway signaled the end for the road. In 1937, the portion of the Long Island Motor Parkway in Suffolk County was donated to Suffolk County. In July 1938, the remainder of the parkway's land was given to Nassau County and the Long Island State Parks Commission.

== Remaining portions ==
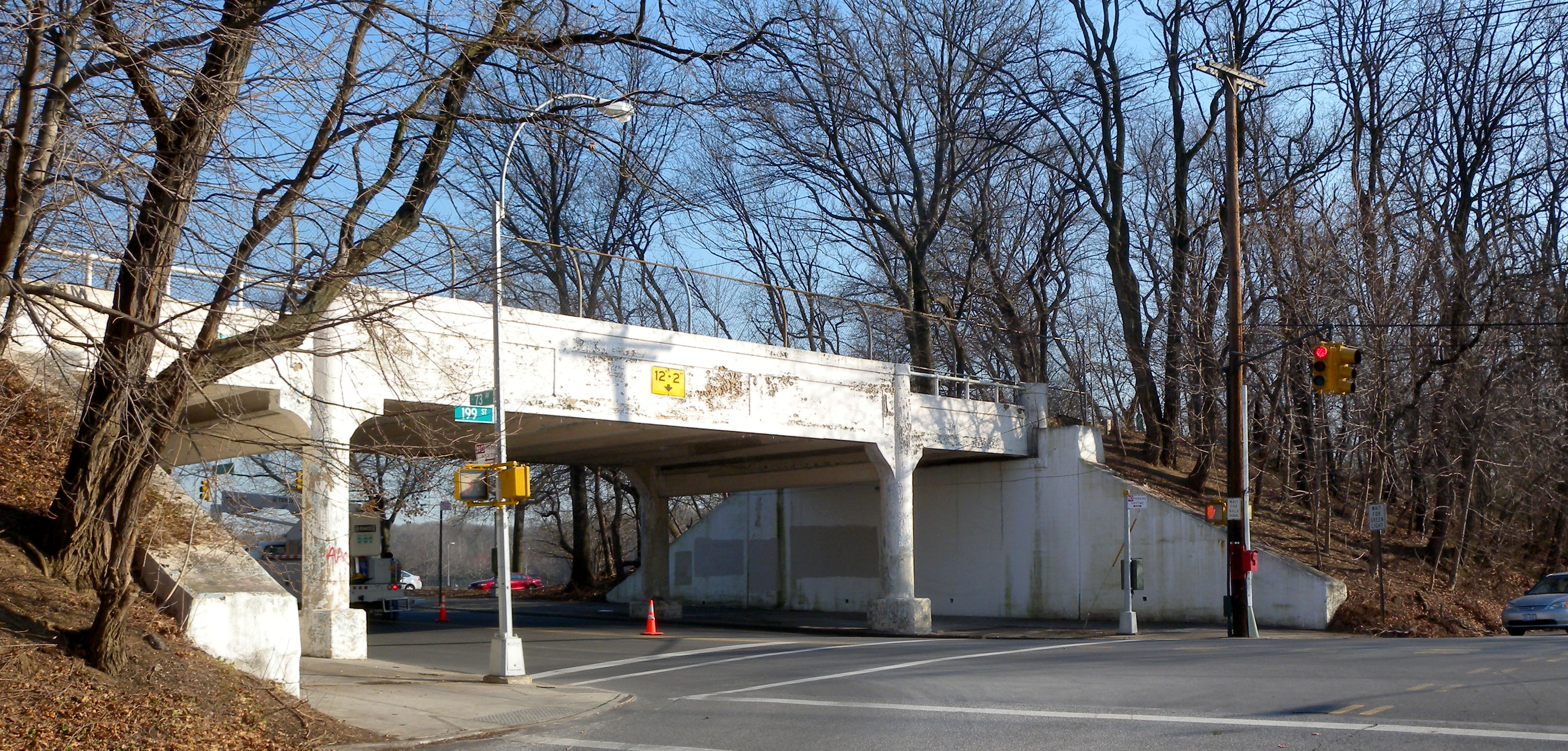
Passing over 73rd Avenue

Most of the road in Queens is a bicycle trail from Cunningham Park to Alley Pond Park, part of the Brooklyn–Queens Greenway. It starts at Francis Lewis Boulevard in Cunningham Park. The path runs south, parallel with 199th Street, and crosses a bridge over 73rd Avenue. It turns east toward Francis Lewis Boulevard, crossing it on a bridge. It continues through the park, crossing under the Clearview Expressway through a tunnel, and then over Hollis Hills Terrace on a third bridge before leaving the park. There is access to 209th and 210th Streets in Hollis Hills. It goes through a wooded corridor, soon crossing over Bell Boulevard on a bridge, and provides access to 220th Street just east of Bell Boulevard. After crossing Springfield Boulevard on another bridge, there is access to Cloverdale Boulevard where the main line of the greenway goes north. The road continues as a spur route that enters Alley Pond Park, crosses under the Grand Central Parkway, and provides access to Union Turnpike before ending at Union Turnpike and Winchester Boulevard at the park's eastern boundary.

The Nassau County roadway has been redeveloped, or turned into a right of way for Long Island Power Authority transmission lines. A small section of the roadway remains in Lake Success in Great Neck, though unmarked and not open to the public. Most of this section is currently within the property of Great Neck South High School. The adjacent former Great Neck toll house was incorporated into the building of a private house.

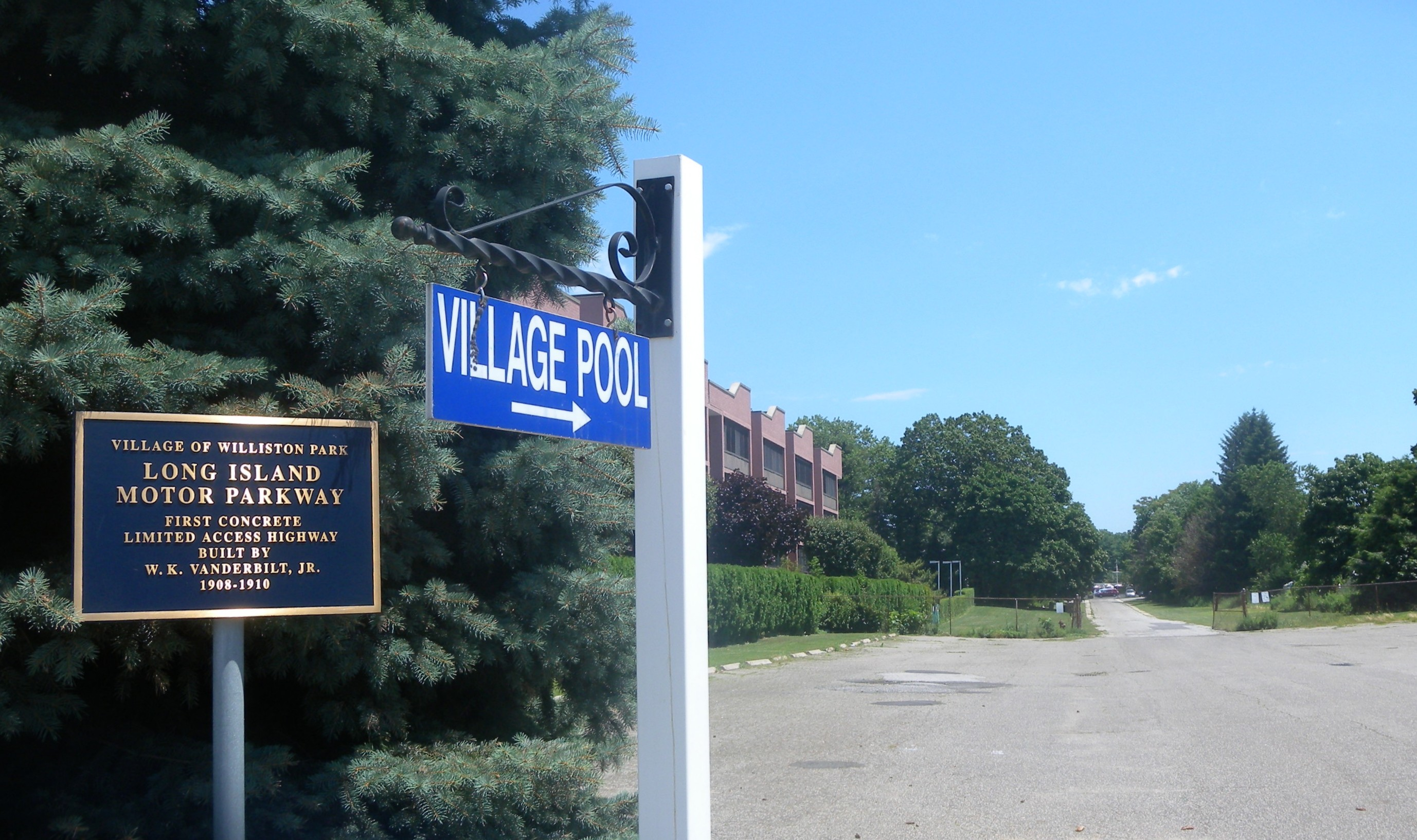
Remnants of the Long Island Motor Parkway in Williston Park

Another section may be seen on either side of Willis Avenue on the boundary between Albertson and Wiliston Park. On the east side of the avenue, several hundred yards of road provide access to the Williston Park pool property abutting the LIRR.

County Route 67
- Location: Melville–Ronkonkoma
- Length: 14.51 mi (23.35 km)

The road survives as a continuous county road, Vanderbilt Motor Parkway (CR 67), from Half Hollow Road in Dix Hills to its original end in Ronkonkoma, just a few blocks short of the lake. Signage along the way also identifies it variously as Vanderbilt Parkway and Motor Parkway. From Half Hollow Road, it goes northeast to NY 231 (Deer Park Avenue). It starts to parallel the Northern State Parkway and intersects with CR 4 (Commack Road) in Commack. It crosses the Sagtikos State Parkway (with northbound access northbound) and heads south to I-495 (the Long Island Expressway). The parkway heads eastward, paralleling the expressway (with access to and from the LIE) before ultimately crossing it and continuing southeast to NY 111 (Joshua's Path). It then heads north, crossing the LIE again at exit 57, and then curves to the east and crosses NY 454 (Veterans Memorial Highway). It heads east across Old Nichols and Terry roads ahead of one final northeastward turn to end at Rosevale Avenue (CR 93) in Ronkonkoma, close to the lake.

Though not a limited-access highway since 1938, most of the road was recognizable into the 1970s, while new intersections continued to be cut through it. In the approximate middle of the road in and around Islandia, office construction and other commercial building has widened the road and made it appear a typical highway.

In 2008 the road celebrated its 100th anniversary. On October 30, 2011, a centennial event marked the 100th anniversary of the completion of the Lake Ronkonkoma section. Led by the winner of the 1909 and 1910 Vanderbilt Cup races, a parade of automobiles made prior to 1948 went from Dix Hills to Lake Ronkonkoma.

== See also ==
- List of county routes in Suffolk County, New York
