= Islip (hamlet), New York =

Islip, New York
- Hamlet and census-designated place Town Seat of Islip
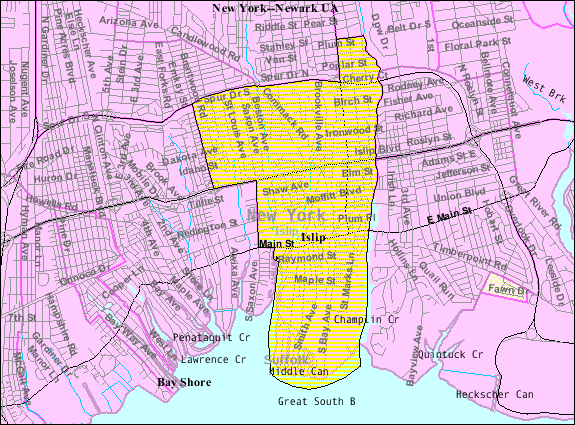
- U.S. census map

- Location on Long Island Location within the state of New York
- Coordinates: 40°45′24″N 73°11′56″W
- Country: United States
- State: New York
- County: Suffolk
- Town: Islip

Area
  - Total: 5.40 sq mi (13.98 km^{2})
  - Land: 4.75 sq mi (12.30 km^{2})
  - Water: 0.65 sq mi (1.68 km^{2})
- Elevation: 16 ft (4.9 m)

Population (2020)
  - Total: 18,418
  - Density: 3,878.6/sq mi (1,497.55/km^{2})
- Time zone: UTC-5 (Eastern (EST))
  - Summer (DST): UTC-4 (EDT)
- ZIP code: 11751
- Area codes: 631, 934
- FIPS code: 36-37869
- GNIS feature ID: 0979097

Islip (/ˈaɪslɪp/ EYE-slip) is a hamlet and census-designated place (CDP) that lies within the town of the same name in Suffolk County, New York. Located on the south shore of Long Island, the CDP had a population of 18,869 at the time of the 2010 census, a decline of 8% from the 2000 census.

== History ==
William Nicoll, a son of New York City Mayor Matthias Nicoll, became a patentee in the 1680s of the east end of what is now the Town of Islip. He accumulated over 100 square miles (260 km^{2}) and named his estate Islip, after the Nicolls' ancestral home in East Northamptonshire, England. His domain included what are now the hamlets of Islip, East Islip, Bayport, Sayville, West Sayville, Oakdale, Great River, Islip Terrace, Central Islip, Hauppauge, Holbrook, Bohemia, Brentwood, Holtsville, and a portion of Ronkonkoma. This land was purchased from Winnequaheagh, Sachem of Connetquot in 1683. The annual fee paid to Governor Thomas Dongan of New York was five bushels of good winter wheat or 25 shillings.

The name "Islip" was chosen by local residents for their local post office when it opened in 1802. Islip was originally a farming community, gradually transforming into a posh enclave for wealthy families in the 19th and 20th centuries. Many of the Colonial Revival, Greek Revival, Romanesque Revival, Federal, Moorish and Victorian mansions that once lined the streets of Islip have been razed, though some remain, adjacent to many newer, large homes. Islip has a wealth of extant Queen Anne Revival homes. Located along the picturesque Great South Bay, Islip has a long history associated with fishing, clamming (the world-famous Doxsee Clam Company started in Islip), swimming and boating. Islip Hamlet has its own public bathing beach, under the jurisdiction of the town. Boating and yachting are as popular today as they were years ago, if not more so, with the development of the communities on the adjacent barrier beach of Fire Island.

== Geography ==
According to the United States Census Bureau, the CDP has a total area of 4.9 square miles (12.7 km^{2}), of which 4.8 square miles (12.4 km^{2}) is land and 0.12 square miles (0.3 km^{2}) – or 2.43% – is water.

Islip is situated on Long Island's South Shore, on the north side of Great South Bay, across from Fire Island.

The Seatuck National Wildlife Refuge is located at the hamlet's southeastern corner.

== Demographics ==
Historical population
Census	Pop.	Note	%±
2000	20,575		—
2010	18,869		−8.3%
2020	18,418		−2.4%
U.S. Decennial Census

As of the census of 2000, there were 20,575 people, 6,868 households and 5,302 families residing in Islip CDP. The population density was 3,808.8 inhabitants per square mile (1,470.6/km^{2}). There were 7,026 housing units, at an average density of 1,300.6 per square mile (502.2/km^{2}). The racial makeup of Islip was 87.67% White, 10.67% Hispanic, 4.90% Black or African-American, 0.10% Native American, 2.07% Asian, 0.03% Pacific Islander, 3.02% from other races, and 2.22% from two or more races.

There were 6,868 households, out of which 38.4% had children under the age of 18 living with them, 61.4% were married couples living together, 12.0% had a female householder with no husband present, and 22.8% were non-families. 18.4% of all households were made up of individuals, and 7.7% had someone living alone who was 65 years of age or older. The average household size was 2.97 and the average family size was 3.38.

The population was spread out, with 27.4% under the age of 18, 6.5% from 18 to 24, 32.6% from 25 to 44, 22.3% from 45 to 64, and 11.1% who were 65 years of age or older. The median age was 36 years. For every 100 females, there were 94.4 males. For every 100 females age 18 and over, there were 90.0 males.

The median income for a household was $67,657, and the median income for a family was $74,361. Males had a median income of $51,424 versus $35,600 for females. The per capita income was $27,383. About 2.6% of families and 4.1% of the population were below the poverty line, including 4.6% of those under age 18 and 7.8% of those age 65 or over.

== Main Street ==
Islip Hamlet is known widely for its quaint shopping district along Main Street (NY 27A). There are gift shops, hairdressers, boutiques, restaurants, pubs, natural food stores and many other types of establishments.

Annual events include the Main Street Festival in the spring, Memorial Day Parade, a Sidewalk Sale, Trick or Treat on Main Street on Halloween, a Holiday House Tour, a Victorian High Tea, the Town Hall Christmas Tree Lighting and the Santa Comes to Town Parade.

== Media ==
Islip is the city of license for radio station, WBWD. The Islip Bulletin newspaper carries community-based articles.

== Bayberry Point ==
Bayberry Point lies adjacent to the Great South Bay. It is made up of three streets, separated by canals. Bayberry is Islip's most affluent area and home to some of its most expensive real estate.

Bayberry Point was originally an experimental living cooperative financed by Horace Havemeyer, a son of sugar-refining magnate Henry O. Havemeyer, and designed by Grovsner Atterbury. It was "an experiment in co-operative living among the very rich." Building began at the end of the 19th century and was completed in 1916, with Havemeyer constructing several Moorish mansions along the banks of the canals, overlooking the bay. Many of these homes still exist today, though most have been extensively renovated.

== Postal services ==
The Islip Post Office is located at 309 Main Street, with a ZIP code of 11751. Islip is the mailing address for most residents of the hamlet, as well as for some residents of adjoining communities. The Islip Post Office opened under that name on September 7, 1802, but was closed just four months later. It reopened July 1, 1808, and has been in continuous operation under that name since then.

== Education ==
=== Schools ===
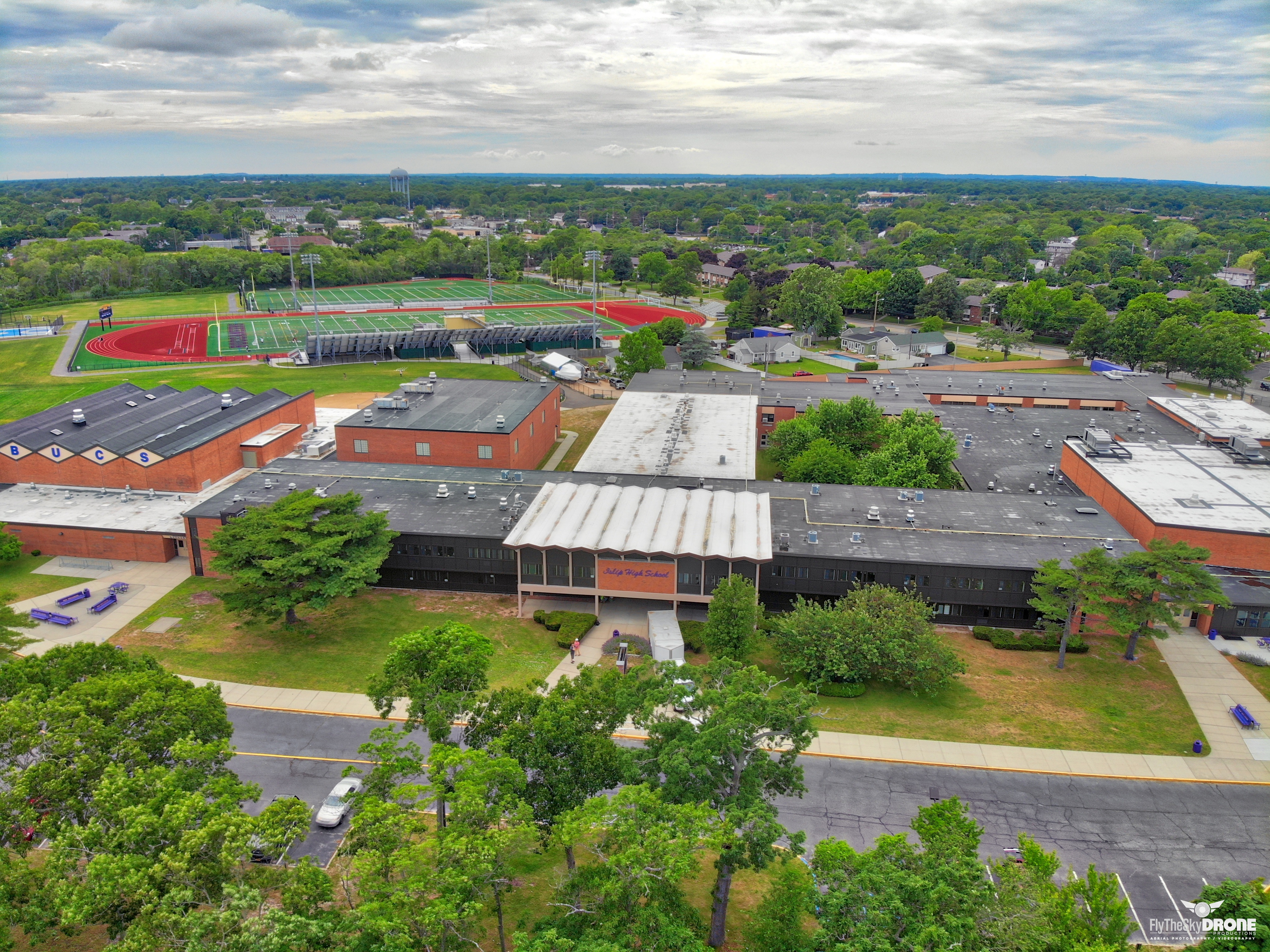
Islip High School in 2018

The hamlet is in the Islip School District, which consists of five schools.

- Wing Elementary School (K–1)
- Sherwood Elementary School (2–5)
- Commack Road Elementary School (2–5)
- Islip Middle School (6–8)
- Islip High School (9–12)

The school district's mascot is the Buccaneer. The school district includes some territory within the adjacent areas of Bay Shore and Central Islip.

=== Library ===
Islip is served by the Islip Public Library, located at 71 Monell Avenue.

== Transportation ==
=== Roads ===
Major roads within the hamlet of Islip include:

- NY 27, also known as Sunrise Highway (Exit 45S)
- NY 27A, also known as Main Street or Montauk Highway
- Heckscher State Parkway (Exit 43S)
- NY 111 (Islip Avenue), southern terminus at NY 27A in Islip
- CR 50, also known as Union Boulevard, runs parallel to NY 27 and 27A

=== Airport ===
Islip hamlet is approximately 10 miles (16 km) from Long Island MacArthur Airport in Ronkonkoma.

=== Train ===
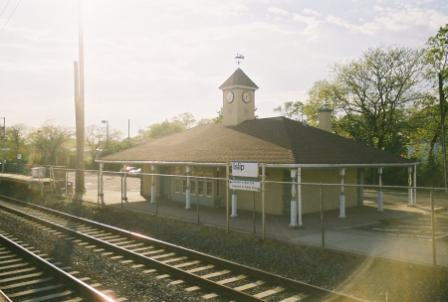
The Islip LIRR station in 2008

Since 1868, Islip has been served by railroads, originally by the South Side Railroad of Long Island, and then by the Long Island Rail Road, which acquired the SSRLI in 1876. Islip Station is on the Montauk Branch of the railroad.

=== Ferries ===
Islip is approximately two miles from the Fire Island Ferries, which is located in the neighboring hamlet of Bay Shore.

=== Buses ===
There are many bus stops in Islip on different lines. Buses are operated and maintained by the local Suffolk Transportation Service, Inc.

== Emergency services ==
=== Emergency Medical Services ===
Parts of Islip are provided emergency medical coverage by both Exchange Ambulance of the Islips Volunteer Ambulance Corporation and Islip Volunteer Fire Department's Rescue Company ambulances. The ambulance base is located at 190 Carleton Avenue in East Islip. The main firehouse headquarters is located at 28 Monell Avenue. A firehouse sub-station is located on Commack Road. Additional areas of Islip are covered by both the Islip Terrace Volunteer Fire Department, located on Beaver Dam Road, and Exchange Ambulance of the Islips Volunteer Ambulance Corporation.

=== Fire protection ===
Parts of Islip are protected by the Islip Volunteer Fire Department. The main firehouse headquarters is located at 28 Monell Avenue. A firehouse sub-station is located on Commack Road. Additional areas of Islip are covered by the Islip Terrace Volunteer Fire Department located on Beaver Dam Road.

=== Law enforcement ===
Law enforcement is provided by the Suffolk County Police Department, as well as the Town of Islip Department of Public Safety.

=== Hospitals ===
Islip is located approximately one mile from Northwell Health Southside Hospital in neighboring Bay Shore, and approximately 3 miles (5 km) from Good Samaritan Hospital Medical Center in West Islip.

== Places of worship ==
Islip hamlet has several places of worship within its borders, including:

- St. Mark's Episcopal Church
- United Methodist Church of Islip
- The Presbyterian Church of Islip
- Trinity Lutheran Church
- New Bethany Baptist Church
- Chabad Jewish Center of Islip

== Notable people ==
- Tobias Harris, professional basketball player in the National Basketball Association
- Henry O. Havemeyer, sugar industrialist
- Peter Lemongello, pop singer
- Alan Mayer, retired professional soccer goalkeeper
- Mike Mondo, professional wrestler
- William H. Russell, businessman, co-founder of the secret Skull and Bones society at Yale University
- Larry Saperstein, actor
- Tom Veryzer, former Major League Baseball shortstop who played from 1973 to 1984 with four different teams
- ZillaKami, rapper

== See also ==
- Central Islip, New York
- East Islip, New York
- Islip (town), New York
- Bay Shore, New York
