= Sagtikos State Parkway =

Highway on Long Island, New York

Sagtikos State Parkway
- Sagtikos State Parkway highlighted in red

Route information
- Maintained by NYSDOT
- Length: 5.14 mi (8.27 km)
- Existed: September 29, 1952–present
- History: Constructed 1949–1952
- Restrictions: No commercial vehicles

Major junctions
- South end: Southern State Parkway / Heckscher State Parkway in West Islip
- I-495 in Brentwood
- North end: Northern State Parkway / Sunken Meadow State Parkway in Commack

Location
- Country: United States
- State: New York
- Counties: Suffolk

Highway system
- New York Highways; Interstate; US; State; Reference; Parkways

The Sagtikos State Parkway (known colloquially as "the Sag") is a 5.14-mile (8.27 km) controlled-access parkway in Suffolk County on Long Island, New York, in the United States. It begins at an interchange with the Southern State and Heckscher Parkways in the hamlet of West Islip and goes north to a large cloverleaf interchange with the Northern State Parkway in the Town of Smithtown, where the Sagtikos ends and the road becomes the Sunken Meadow State Parkway. The parkway comprises the southern half of New York State Route 908K (NY 908K), an unsigned reference route, with the Sunken Meadow State Parkway forming the northern portion.

The Sagtikos Parkway was proposed by the Long Island State Park Commission to help bridge a gap in the eastern part of the Long Island Parkway system. Construction began in 1949 with the opening of an interchange between Bay Shore Road and the Southern State Parkway. Work on the parkway itself began the following year, with plans calling for connections to three spurs: the Captree State Parkway (now Robert Moses Causeway), the Sunken Meadow Spur (Sunken Meadow State Parkway), and the Heckscher Spur (Heckscher State Parkway). The parkway was completed in 1952, closing the highway loop on Long Island.

As is the case with most other parkways in New York, commercial vehicles are prohibited from using the Sagtikos State Parkway.

== Route description ==
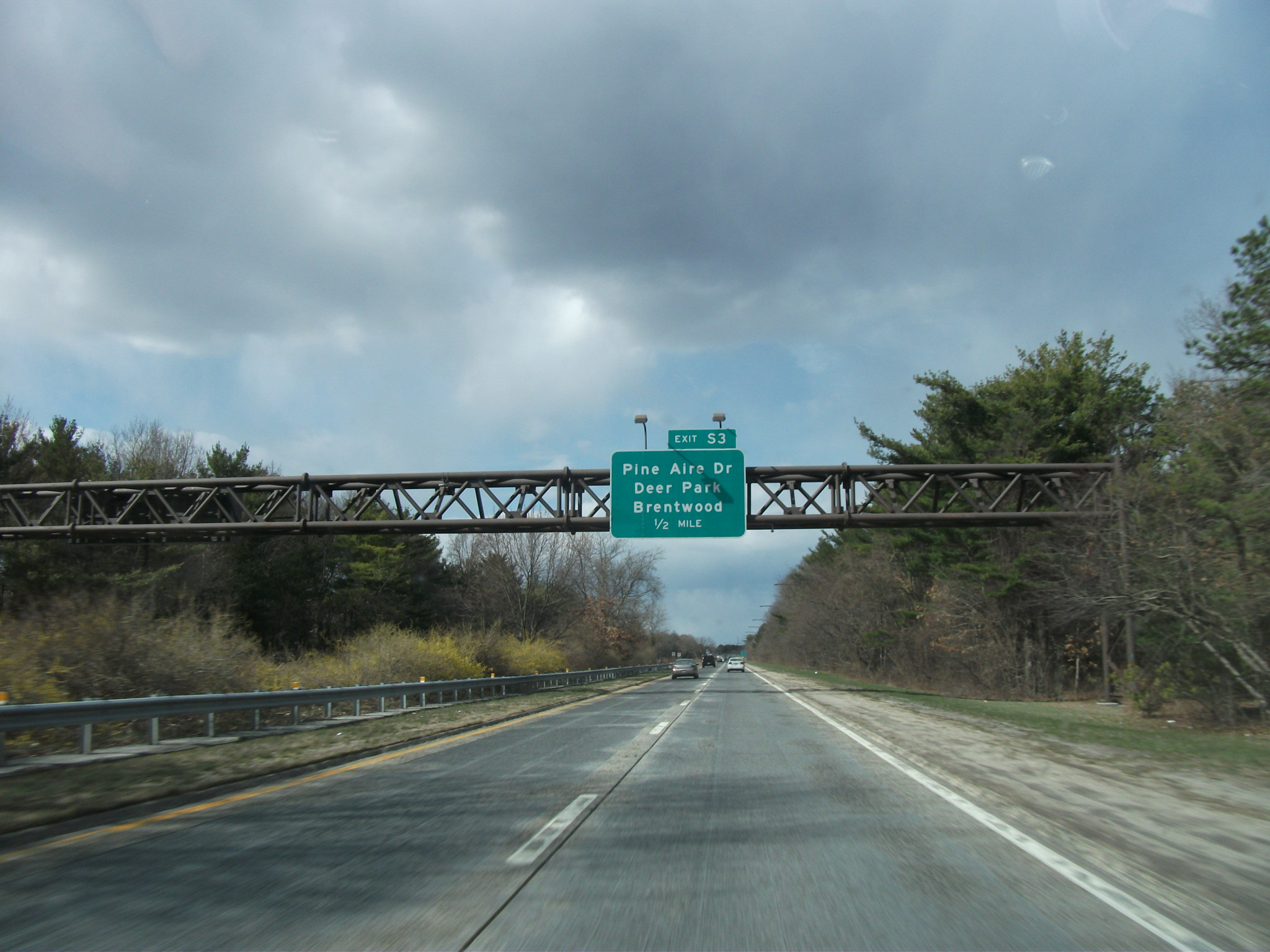
The Sagtikos Parkway approaching exit S3 in Brentwood.

The Sagtikos State Parkway begins at an interchange with the Southern and Heckscher state parkways in the hamlet of West Islip, just north of the Robert Moses Causeway's junction with the Southern State Parkway. Heading southbound, this junction is signed as exit S4. The parkway proceeds northward through the Town of Islip as a four-lane divided highway, passing through residential parts of the adjacent hamlet of Brentwood to reach exit S3, a partial cloverleaf interchange with Pine Aire Drive. Just north of the junction, the highway passes over the Main Line of the Long Island Rail Road. Continuing northward through Islip, the Sagtikos Parkway leaves Brentwood ahead of exit S2, a connection to County Route 13 (CR 13, named Crooked Hill Road). The southbound exit serves CR 13 by way of access roads through the Pilgrim Psychiatric Center while the northbound direction uses part of G Road to reach CR 13 and Suffolk County Community College's Grant Campus.

Past the exit, the Sagtikos State Parkway crosses under CR 13 and immediately reaches the Sagtikos Interchange at exit S1 – a large, modified cloverleaf interchange with the Long Island Expressway (Interstate 495). The junction brings the parkway into the Town of Smithtown, where it bends northwestward and parallels CR 67 (Vanderbilt Motor Parkway) for a half-mile (0.8 km) through the town's Commack section. CR 67 eventually turns westward to pass over the Sagtikos Parkway, at which point the parkway curves back to the north and enters exit SM1E, a cloverleaf interchange serving as the Northern State Parkway's exit 44. The Sagtikos State Parkway name ends here while the highway continues northward toward Long Island's North Shore as the Sunken Meadow State Parkway.

According to annual average daily traffic counts compiled in 2011 by NYSDOT, the most-traveled stretch of the Sagtikos State Parkway was the portion between the Southern State Parkway and the Long Island Expressway. The part between the Southern State and Pine Aire Drive handled an average of 87,250 vehicles per day; slightly lower numbers were recorded along the segment between Pine Aire Drive and the Long Island Expressway, with roughly 85,300 vehicles using the section on a daily basis. The portion between the Long Island Expressway and the Northern State Parkway carries an average of 67,600 vehicles per day. All three segments saw a rise in traffic over the course of the previous decade, with the Pine Aire Drive–Long Island Expressway segment gaining 14,000 vehicles per day during that time.

== History ==
=== Construction and opening ===
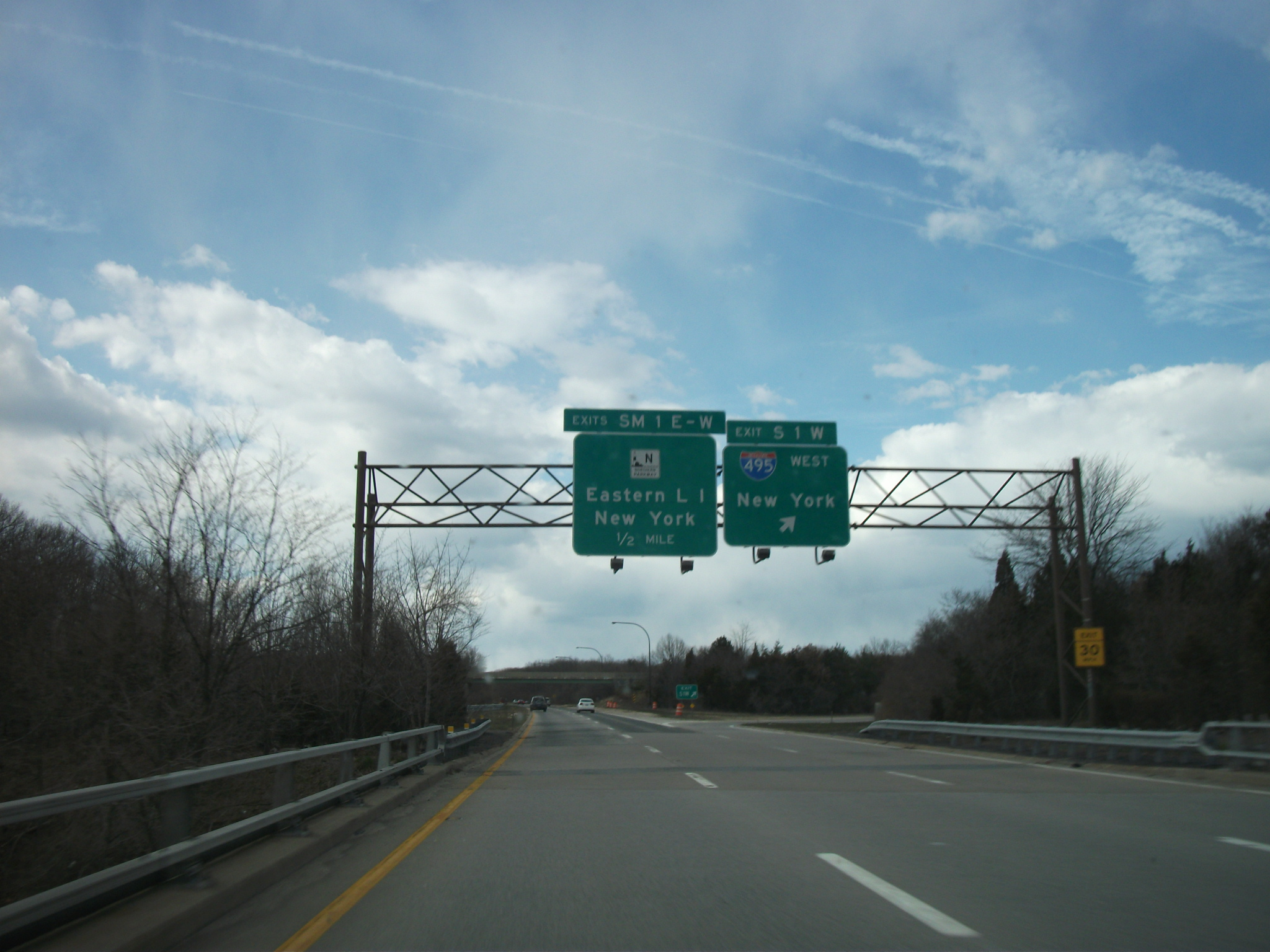
Approaching exit S1W northbound and the changeover to the Sunken Meadow Parkway in Commack

The Sagtikos State Parkway was first proposed in the 1920s as a connector between the Northern and Southern state parkways. In order to construct the freeway, the heirs of the late David Gardiner, who owned the historic Sagtikos Manor in West Bay Shore, donated 197 acres (80 ha) of land to the Long Island State Park Commission (LISPC). This donation was considered unusual by the commission as it would break up the family's estate, which had been constructed in 1692 and served George Washington in 1780. In addition to this donation, James Fisher, a nearby resident, gave the commission 23.5 acres (9.5 ha) of land north of the Gardiner property and another 0.3 acres (0.12 ha) north of the Fisher property to ensure that LISPC had the necessary right-of-way for the new parkway.

The right-of-way on which the parkway was built had originally been part of a private road leading to Sagtikos Manor. The parkway was designed to have connections with the Sunken Meadow Spur (the future Sunken Meadow State Parkway) and the Captree State Parkway (now known as the Robert Moses Causeway) proposed by New York City urban planner Robert Moses. On November 13, 1949, a new interchange between the Southern State Parkway and Bay Shore Road was opened to traffic. This interchange would eventually serve as the Southern State Parkway's junction with the Sagtikos, Heckscher and Captree state parkways. Proposals conceived at this time called for grading on the new Sagtikos State Parkway to begin in early 1950.

In March 1950, $3 million (1950 USD) was earmarked out of a $104.5 million budget for the start of construction on the parkway. The contract for paving 4.76 miles (7.66 km) of the Sagtikos Parkway was awarded by the New York State Department of Public Works on June 7, 1951, to Hudson Contracting Corporation of Kew Gardens, who entered a bid of $1,407,037 (1951 USD) for the project. The remainder of the parkway was paved as part of a contract valued around $418,000 (1951 USD) and let by the state on July 11. A 3-mile (4.8 km) stretch of the Northern State Parkway was also built as part of the project. On September 29, 1952, an extension of the Northern State Parkway, Southern State Parkway, and the entire length of the Sagtikos State Parkway were opened without celebration. Robert Moses commented that the completed parkway reflected LISPC's objective to construct well-designed recreational facilities.

=== Roadway improvements ===
From 1997–2001, engineers from NYSDOT worked on a $6.5 million (2001 USD) study aimed to improve Long Island's transportation system by 2020. The resulting plan included proposals to widen 130 miles (210 km) of roads, including the entirety of the Sagtikos State Parkway – from the Southern State Parkway to the Northern State Parkway. These proposals would give the Sagtikos a restricted-access lane for buses and carpooling drivers, which would be part of a 60-mile (97 km) system of similar lanes across Long Island.

In 2002, the Wolkoffs, a family of real estate developers, bought land used by the Pilgrim Psychiatric Center for $20 million (2002 USD) with the intent of redeveloping the property as a new smart growth community named Heartland Town Square. The community, situated near the interchange between the Sagtikos Parkway and the Long Island Expressway (I-495), would have 9,000 housing units and various commercial & recreational buildings. As part of the redevelopment of the property, a study was done on the existing facilities and the surrounding area, which noted several deficiencies in the area's transportation system – including several related to the Sagtikos. The study determined that the deficiencies would be "exacerbated" if no changes were made.

In response, the study suggested that a third lane be constructed along the Sagtikos from the Southern State Parkway to the Long Island Expressway. The bridges over the Sagtikos at Campus Road and Crooked Hill Road (CR 13) would have to be reconstructed to make room for the added lane, and the interchange with Pine Aire Drive (exit S3) would be completely rebuilt. A new interchange would also be constructed on the parkway between Pine Aire Drive and Campus Road, creating a junction with CR 100. The project would cost $4 billion (2011 USD) and be built in phases for 15–20 years.

As of 2012, progress on the project has been stalled by disagreements between the Wolkoffs and the Town of Islip, over the amount the Wolkoffs would spend for the transportation piece of the project, and between the family and labor unions over wages and health care. The town of Islip has stated that the Wolkoffs agreed to spend $75 million (2011 USD) for the infrastructure improvements; however, the family stated in a September 2011 letter that they would only commit to $27 million (2011 USD) and that they never agreed to the original figure. Gerald Wolkoff thought that the discrepancy stemmed from his belief that transportation should be funded by the government, not from private sources, as his project would generate tax revenue for the government. Despite the issues surrounding the project, the Heartland project received $2.5 million from the State of New York for roadway improvements in December 2011. The funding was part of a $101 million (2011 USD) package given to Long Island for various economic improvements.

== Exit list ==
The entire route is in Suffolk County.

Location	mi	km	Exit	Destinations	Notes
West Islip	0.00	0.00	–	Southern State Parkway west – New York	Southern terminus; exit 41A on Southern State Parkway
West Islip			S4	Heckscher State Parkway east – East Islip	Southbound exit and northbound entrance; exit 41A on Heckscher State Parkway
Brentwood	2.00	3.22	S3	Pine Aire Drive – Deer Park, Brentwood	
Brentwood	3.10– 3.50	4.99– 5.63	S2	Crooked Hill Road (CR 13) – Pilgrim Psychiatric Center	Access via G Road/Pilgrim Center Road
Brentwood	4.00	6.44	S1	I-495 – New York, Riverhead	Signed as exits S1E (east) and S1W (west); exit 53 on I-495
Commack	5.14	8.27	SM1	Northern State Parkway – Eastern Long Island, New York	Signed as exits SM1E (east) and SM1W (west); exit 44 on Northern Parkway; exit nos. correspond to Sunken Meadow
Commack	5.14	8.27	–	Sunken Meadow State Parkway north – Sunken Meadow Park	Continuation north
1.000 mi = 1.609 km; 1.000 km = 0.621 mi: Incomplete access
