= Sunken Meadow State Parkway =

Highway on Long Island, New York

Sunken Meadow State Parkway
- Sunken Meadow State Parkway highlighted in red

Route information
- Maintained by NYSDOT and NYS OPRHP
- Length: 6.19 mi (9.96 km) 1.11 mi (1.79 km) within park boundaries
- Existed: 1954–present
- History: Opened November 29, 1954 (to NY 25); April 1, 1957 (full length)
- Restrictions: No commercial vehicles south of exit SM5E

Major junctions
- South end: Northern State Parkway / Sagtikos State Parkway in Commack
- NY 25 / CR 14 in Commack; NY 25A in Fort Salonga
- North end: Sunken Meadow State Park in Fort Salonga

Location
- Country: United States
- State: New York
- Counties: Suffolk

Highway system
- New York Highways; Interstate; US; State; Reference; Parkways

The Sunken Meadow State Parkway is a 6.19-mile (9.96 km) state parkway in Suffolk County, on Long Island, New York. Located entirely within the Town of Smithtown, the Sunken Meadow begins at a cloverleaf interchange with the Northern State Parkway (exits 44–45) and the northern terminus of the Sagtikos State Parkway. It is a northern spur of the Sagtikos Parkway, which opened in September 1952. The northern end of the parkway is at a roundabout near the Long Island Sound in Sunken Meadow State Park. The parkway comprises the northern half of New York State Route 908K (NY 908K, an unsigned reference route), with the Sagtikos State Parkway forming the southern portion.

The Sunken Meadow Spur Parkway was first proposed in 1928 when the Town of Smithtown deeded over 400 acres (160 ha) of land to the Long Island State Park Commission via public vote. Due to land use restrictions in Nassau County, Sunken Meadow was the first park east of New York City, because provisions for a parkway would be near impossible to build. Construction of the parkway commenced after the Sagtikos opened in September 1952, with the interchange at the Northern State Parkway. The first portion opened to traffic in November 1954 from the Northern State/Sagtikos interchange to NY 25, with a slated completion in 1956. The parkway was completed in April 1957, opening on the 1st of that month. As part of the parkway opening, improvements were made to Sunken Meadow State Park, including expanded vehicle capacity and a longer boardwalk.

As is the case with most other parkways in New York, commercial vehicles are prohibited from using the Sunken Meadow, with an exception for the portion north of NY 25A.

== Route description ==
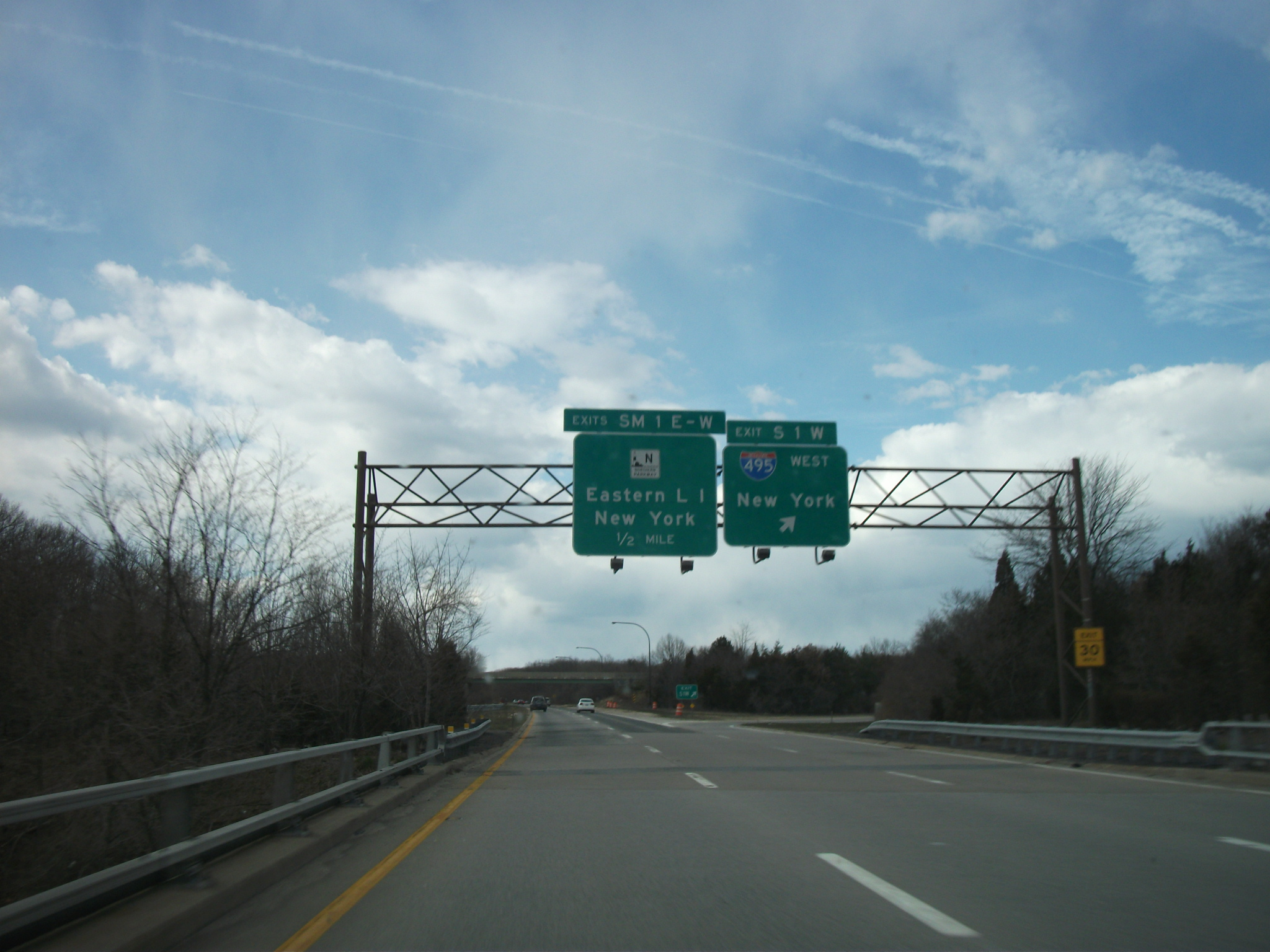
The Sunken Meadow State Parkway's Exit SM1W signage on the Sagtikos State Parkway

The Sunken Meadow State Parkway begins as a four-lane freeway at exit 44–45 off the Northern State Parkway, a cloverleaf interchange that also serves as the northern terminus of the Sagtikos State Parkway. Southbound, this interchange is designed as exit SM1. After the Northern State, the Sunken Meadow continues northeast on the right-of-way used by the Sagtikos, crossing through Commack. Passing west of Valmont Village Park, the four-lane parkway crosses under New Highway, bending northeast through Commack, becoming a divided parkway as it enters exit SM2. This exit, which is only served northbound, connects the Sunken Meadow to NY 454 (Veterans Memorial Highway) via Harned Road, a local street in Commack. The four-lane parkway continues northward through Commack, crossing under NY 454 a short distance after the interchange. At the overpass, the westbound entrance from NY 454 connects to the southbound Sunken Meadow. Immediately after crossing under NY 454, the Sunken Meadow State Parkway continues northward into exit SM3, which serves as a cloverleaf interchange with NY 25 (Jericho Turnpike). The four-lane parkway continues north out of the interchange, immediately entering exit SM3A, which northbound connects to County Route 14 (CR 14; Indian Head Road). Southbound, this interchange serves Old Indian Head Road, and is signed as part of exit SM2. After exit SM3A, the Sunken Meadow bends northeast, becoming a divided highway once again, crossing through Commack. The parkway bends north once again, crossing under Scholar Lane before paralleling Old Commack Road under Old Northport Road. After a bend to the northeast, the parkway enters Kings Park.

In Kings Park, the Sunken Meadow State Parkway bends northward, crossing under the Long Island Rail Road's Port Jefferson Branch and entering exit SM4. Exit SM4 is a cloverleaf interchange that serves CR 11 (Pulaski Road / East Northport Road). After the interchange with CR 11, the Sunken Meadow enters Fort Salonga as a four-lane parkway with a wide median, bending northeast into exit SM5. Exit SM5, the last on the Sunken Meadow, is a cloverleaf interchange with NY 25A (Fort Salonga Road). After crossing over NY 25A, the Sunken Meadow State Parkway enters Sunken Meadow State Park at a toll barrier in the middle of the interchange. The parkway continues north through Sunken Meadow State Park and becomes a three-lane surface road, before terminating at a roundabout near the Long Island Sound.

== History ==
Sunken Meadow State Park began as several parcels of land owned by the town of Smithtown that were combined to form the park. When the park first opened in 1928, it was 400 acres (160 ha) large. This land had been given to the state by a public vote of 493–436 (for vs. against) with promises of a new parkway and expanded facilities. By 1949, this had been expanded over to 925 acres (374 ha), with 10,000 feet (3,000 m) of beach. Due to restrictive land usage in Nassau County for a parkway, Robert Moses and the Long Island State Park Commission announced that the burden of providing a beach on the northern shore of Long Island rested on Sunken Meadow State Park. However, no funding had been received for the new parkway, which had been requested.

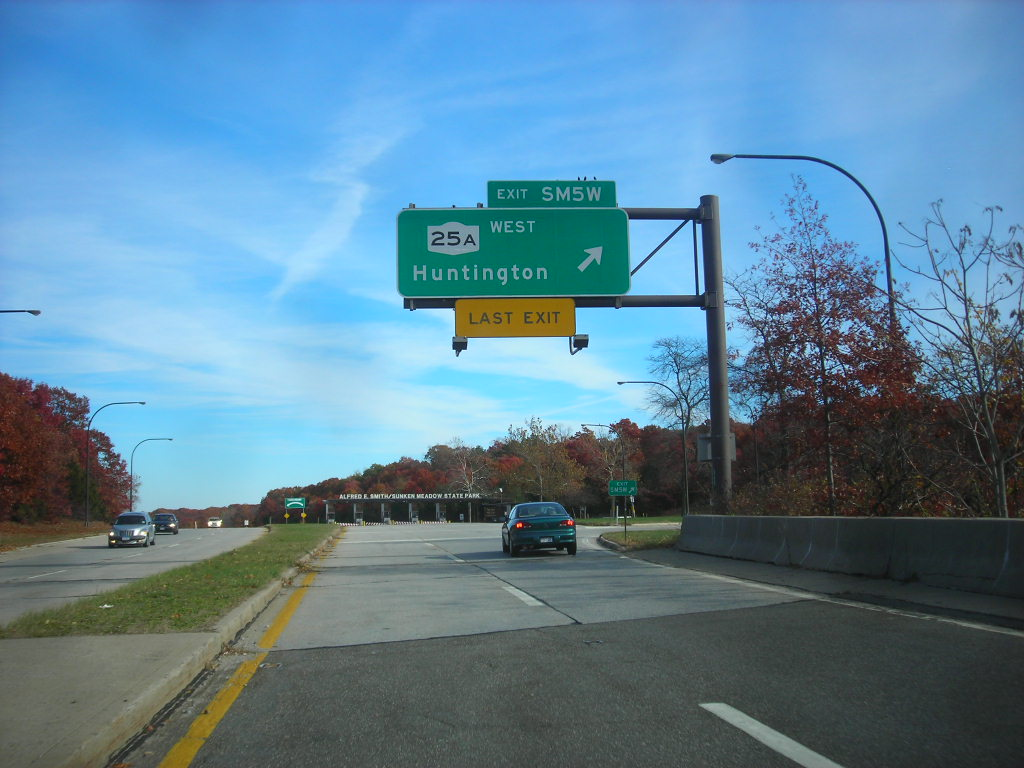
The Sunken Meadow State Parkway northbound at the toll barrier for Sunken Meadow State Park and exit SM5W, a ramp to NY 25A west

The Sunken Meadow State Parkway was considered as one part of three spurs of the Sagtikos State Parkway, which bridged the eastern gap of the Long Island parkway system. Then designated the Sunken Meadow Spur, the route was to connect the Northern State and Sagtikos to Sunken Meadow State Park. The Sagtikos State Parkway opened on September 29, 1952, with provisions for the Sunken Meadow State. Originally when the park opened, an entrance was placed on a remote section of NY 25A in Fort Salonga.

Slated with a 1956 completion date, the first 2 miles (3.2 km) from the Northern State to NY 25 (Jericho Turnpike) opened on November 29, 1954, with the landscaping at NY 25 incomplete. The LISPC believed that Sunken Meadow State Park, when the parkway was finished, was to become the second-most used park on Long Island, behind Jones Beach State Park. On April 1, 1957, the Long Island Parks Commission opened the full alignment of the Sunken Meadow State Parkway to traffic, after an $11 million (1957 USD) construction project on the 7-mile (11 km).

With the opening of the new parkway, the Long Island Parks Commission expanded Sunken Meadow State Park to handle the additional traffic. The commission added four new parking lots, which brought capacity on the parkway from 3,000 vehicles to 7,500 vehicles. A new overlook was constructed, which also had the capacity for 1,250 more vehicles. A new cafeteria, extensions of the then-2,000-foot (610 m) boardwalk another 1,700 feet (520 m), along with other new facilities valued at $1 million (1957 USD) were also constructed. These expansions brought the size of Sunken Meadow State Park to 1,020 acres (410 ha) with 11,700 feet (3,600 m) of beachfront.

From 1997 to 2001, engineers worked on a $6.5 million (2001 USD) study that would expand Long Island's transportation system by 2020. Included within the plan was 130 miles (210 km) of road widening, which included the Sunken Meadow State Parkway from the Northern State to NY 454. These proposals would give the Sunken Meadow a restricted-access lane for buses and carpooling drivers, part of a 60 miles (97 km) long system on Long Island.

== Major intersections ==
The entire route is in Suffolk County.

Location	mi	km	Exit	Destinations	Notes
Commack	0.00	0.00	–	Sagtikos State Parkway south	Continuation south
Commack	0.00	0.00	SM1	Northern State Parkway – New York, Eastern Long Island	Signed as exits SM1E (east) and SM1W (west); exit 45 on Northern State Parkway
Commack	1.67	2.69	SM2	To NY 454 – Patchogue, Commack	Northbound exit only; access via Harned Road
Commack	2.07	3.33	SM3	NY 25 (Jericho Turnpike) – South Huntington, Smithtown	No southbound access to NY 25 west; signed as exits SM3E (east) and SM3W (west)
Commack	2.30	3.70	SM3A	Indian Head Road (CR 14) – Kings Park	Northbound exit and entrance
Commack	2.30	3.70	SM3W	To NY 25 west (Jericho Turnpike) – South Huntington	Southbound exit and entrance; access via Old Indian Head Road
Kings Park	5.07	8.16	SM4	CR 11 (Pulaski Road) – Kings Park, East Northport	Signed as exits SM4E (east) and SM4W (west)
Fort Salonga	6.07	9.77	SM5	NY 25A – Huntington, Smithtown	Signed as exits SM5E (east) and SM5W (west); all trucks must exit
Fort Salonga	6.19	9.96	Fee booths (northbound)		
Fort Salonga	6.40	10.30	–	South Field	Northbound exit and entrance
Fort Salonga	7.02	11.30	Northern end of freeway section		
Fort Salonga	7.30	11.75		Sunken Meadow State Park	Roundabout; northern terminus
1.000 mi = 1.609 km; 1.000 km = 0.621 mi: Incomplete access; Tolled
