= New York State Route 111 =

Highway on Long Island, New York

New York State Route 111
- Map of Suffolk County with NY 111 highlighted in red

Route information
- Maintained by NYSDOT
- Length: 9.42 mi (15.16 km)
- Existed: 1930–present

Major junctions
- South end: NY 27A in Islip
- Heckscher State Parkway in Islip; I-495 in Hauppauge
- North end: NY 25 / NY 25A in Village of the Branch

Location
- Country: United States
- State: New York
- Counties: Suffolk

Highway system
- New York Highways; Interstate; US; State; Reference; Parkways
← NY 110	→ NY 112

New York State Route 111 (NY 111) is a state highway located in Suffolk County, New York, in the United States. It runs north–south for 9.42 miles (15.16 km) through the towns of Islip and Smithtown, connecting NY 27A in the town seat of Islip to the east end of the NY 25 and NY 25A concurrency in Smithtown's Village of the Branch. Most of the road is a two-lane highway, save for several short four-lane stretches in the vicinity of interchanges along the route. NY 111 was assigned as part of the 1930 renumbering of state highways in New York as an East Islip–Village of the Branch highway, using what is now County Route 17 (CR 17) south of Hauppauge. It was realigned to serve the hamlet of Islip in 1966.

== Route description ==
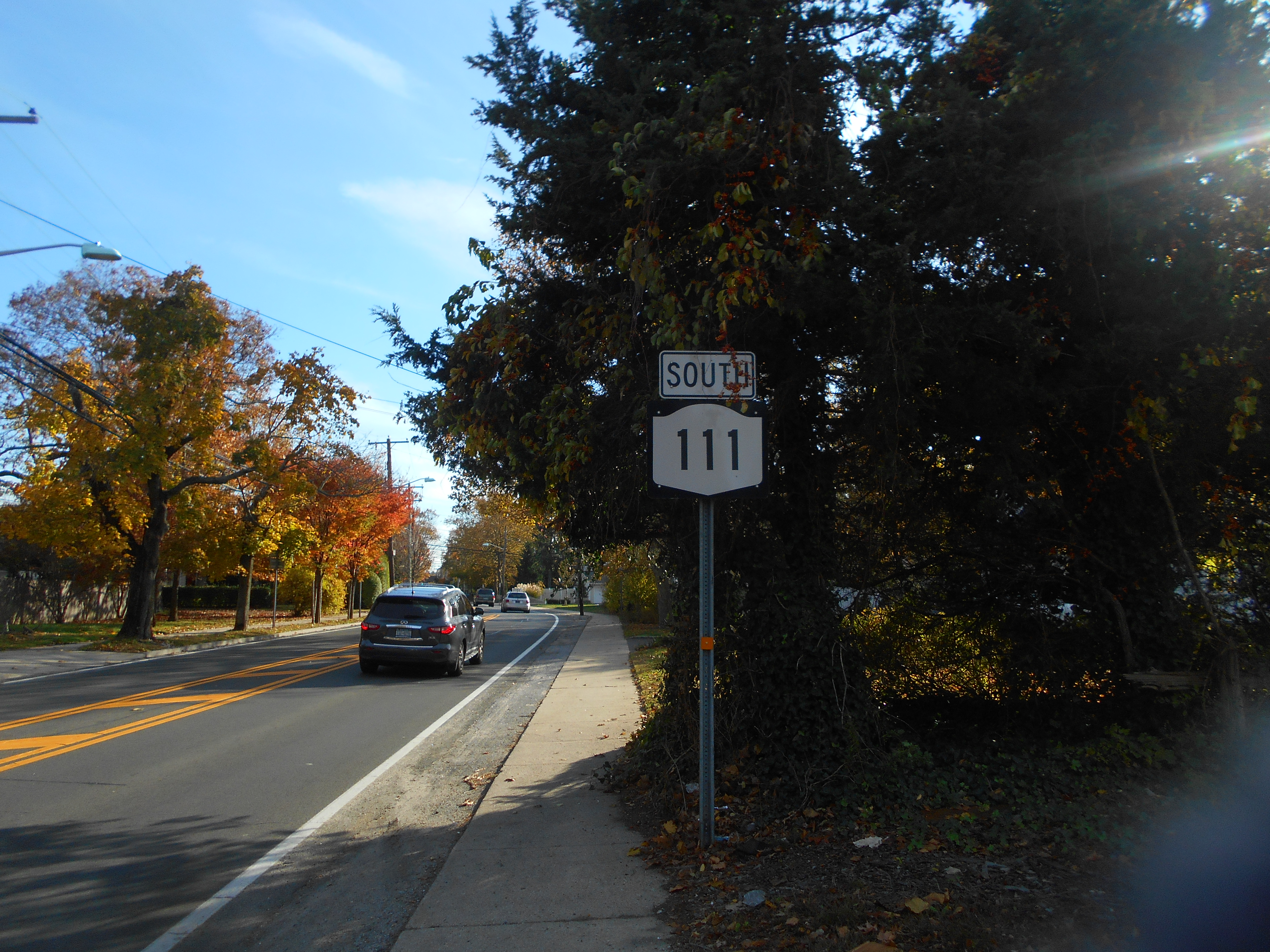
NY 111 approaching the southern terminus at NY 27A in Islip

NY 111 begins at an intersection with NY 27A (Main Street) in the town of Islip. The route proceeds north through the hamlet of Islip along the two-lane Islip Avenue, passing through a short residential stretch ahead of an intersection with CR 50 (Union Boulevard). NY 111 soon crosses the nearby Montauk Branch of the Long Island Rail Road just east of the Islip station, from where it continues north past various businesses and residences. As the road heads northward, it intersects with Bittermint Street, a connector to NY 27 (Sunrise Highway) eastbound. After crossing over NY 27, the route intersects with a ramp serving the westbound lanes and Islip Boulevard, which connects NY 27 westbound to NY 111.

Past Sunrise Highway, the route serves many blocks of residences prior to entering a cloverleaf interchange with the Heckscher State Parkway (exit 43). After this junction, NY 111 continues north as a two-lane residential street to the hamlet of Central Islip. Here, the residences give way to various businesses as NY 111 and Islip Avenue briefly bend to the northwest for several blocks. Another north-northwesterly stretch follows, bringing the highway over another Long Island Rail Road line, this time the Ronkonkoma Branch. Past the railroad overpass, NY 111 intersects with CR 100 (Suffolk Avenue), at which point NY 111 leaves Islip Avenue and changes names to Joshua's Path.

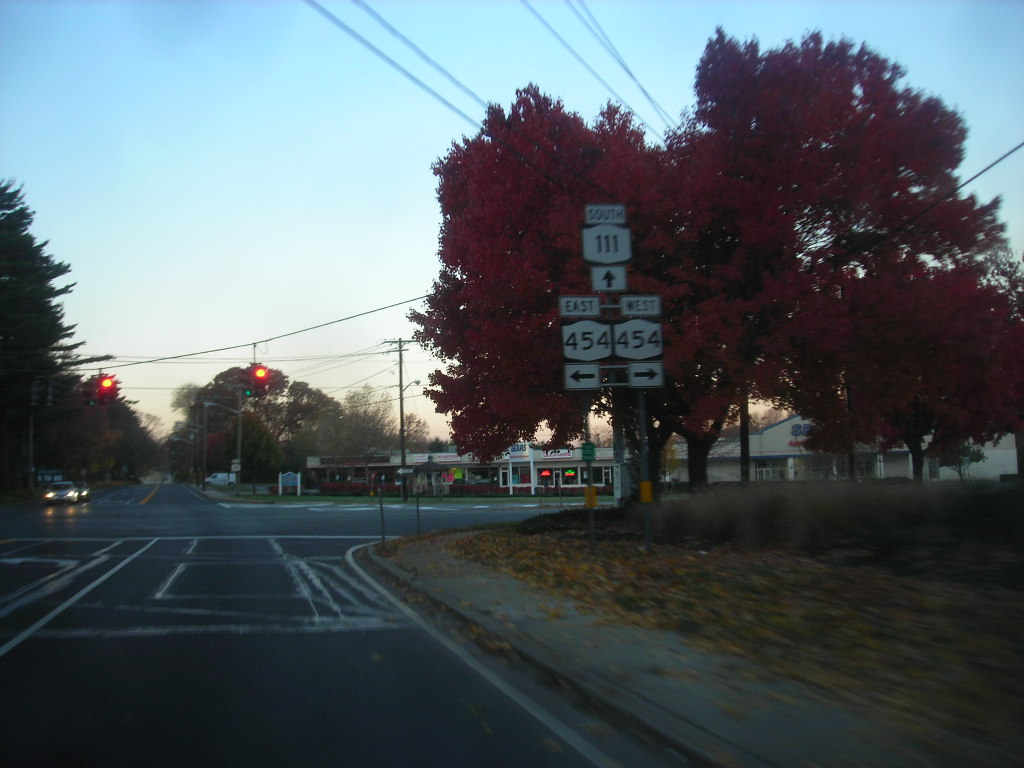
NY 111 southbound at the junction with NY 454

One block north of CR 100, Caleb's Path forks off to the northwest while NY 111 splits to the northeast along Joshua's Path, serving a long stretch of homes in the northern part of Central Islip. Several blocks to the north, NY 111 intersects with CR 67 (Long Island Motor Parkway) at an at-grade intersection on the northern edge of the community. Now out of Central Islip, the route traverses industrialized areas surrounding a large Y intersection with CR 17 (Wheeler Road) in Hauppauge. NY 111 takes on the Wheeler Road name, and the route immediately enters an interchange (exit 56) with the Long Island Expressway (Interstate 495). From here, the route bends northeast along Wheeler Road, paralleling the Nissequogue River as it serves the northern part of the town of Islip.

The highway passes the American Real Estate School and a campus of Empire State College before intersecting NY 454 (Veterans Highway). Not far from NY 454, NY 111 has a short concurrency with CR 76 (Townline Road) along the Islip–Smithtown town line and then the names changes to Hauppauge Road before fully crossing into Smithtown. After forking from CR 76, NY 111 continues northeast through the hamlet of Hauppauge, crossing NY 347 (Smithtown Bypass) at-grade as it runs across another residential stretch. The route soon enters Village of the Branch, where it bends northward into a large commercial area at the center of the community. Here, NY 111 intersects with East Main Street, which enters the junction from the west as NY 25 and NY 25A. At this point, NY 25 continues eastward as Middle Country Road, NY 111 terminates, and NY 25A turns northward on NY 111's right-of-way, changing names to North Country Road.

== History ==
The origins of NY 111 date back to 1914 when the state of New York awarded a contract on July 29 to improve a 9.56-mile (15.39 km) highway in the towns of Islip and Smithtown to state highway standards. The road covered by the project began at Main Street in East Islip and headed north on Carleton Avenue and Wheeler Road to Hauppauge, from where it continued northeast to Village of the Branch via Hauppauge Road. Reconstruction of the road cost $263,359 (equivalent to $4.95 million in 2024), and the rebuilt road was added to the state highway system on June 1, 1922, as unsigned State Highway 1208 (SH 1208). In the 1930 renumbering of state highways in New York, hundreds of state-maintained highways were assigned a posted route designation for the first time. One of these was SH 1208, which became NY 111.

On September 13, 1966, the New York State Department of Public Works realigned NY 111 south of Hauppauge to follow a slightly more westerly alignment to the hamlet of Islip along Joshua's Path and Islip Avenue, two streets that ran parallel to the route's original path on Carleton Avenue and Wheeler Road. Ownership and maintenance of NY 111's former routing was transferred to Suffolk County, which redesignated the road as CR 17. The ultimately cancelled eastern extension of the Northern State Parkway would have crossed NY 111 just south of Village of the Branch at a point north of Mount Pleasant Road. An interchange between the parkway and NY 111 was planned at that location.

== Major intersections ==
The entire route is in Suffolk County.

Location	mi	km	Destinations	Notes
Community of Islip	0.00	0.00	NY 27A (Main Street)	Southern terminus; former NY 27
Community of Islip	0.84	1.35	NY 27 (Sunrise Highway)	Exit 45 on NY 27
Community of Islip	1.78	2.86	Heckscher State Parkway – New York, East Islip	Exits 43S-N on Heckscher State Parkway
Hauppauge	5.44	8.75	CR 17 south (Wheeler Road) – East Islip, Central Islip	Northern terminus of CR 17; former routing of NY 111
Hauppauge	5.58	8.98	I-495 – New York, Riverhead	Exit 56 on I-495
Hauppauge	6.78	10.91	NY 454 – Commack, Patchogue	
Hauppauge	7.53	12.12	NY 347 – Commack, Port Jefferson	
Village of the Branch	9.42	15.16	NY 25 / NY 25A – New York, Port Jefferson, Riverhead	Northern terminus
1.000 mi = 1.609 km; 1.000 km = 0.621 mi: Concurrency terminus
