= New York State Route 27A =

Highway on Long Island, New York

New York State Route 27A
- Map of Long Island with NY 27A highlighted in red

Route information
- Auxiliary route of NY 27
- Maintained by NYSDOT and Nassau County
- Length: 17.31 mi (27.86 km)
- Existed: c. 1931–present

Major junctions
- West end: NY 27 in Massapequa
- Robert Moses Causeway in West Islip; Heckscher State Parkway in East Islip
- East end: CR 85 in Great River

Location
- Country: United States
- State: New York
- Counties: Nassau, Suffolk

Highway system
- New York Highways; Interstate; US; State; Reference; Parkways
← NY 27	→ NY 28

New York State Route 27A (NY 27A) is a state highway between Massapequa in Nassau County and Great River in Suffolk County, on Long Island, New York, in the United States. Its two most prominent components are Merrick Road and Montauk Highway.

== Route description ==
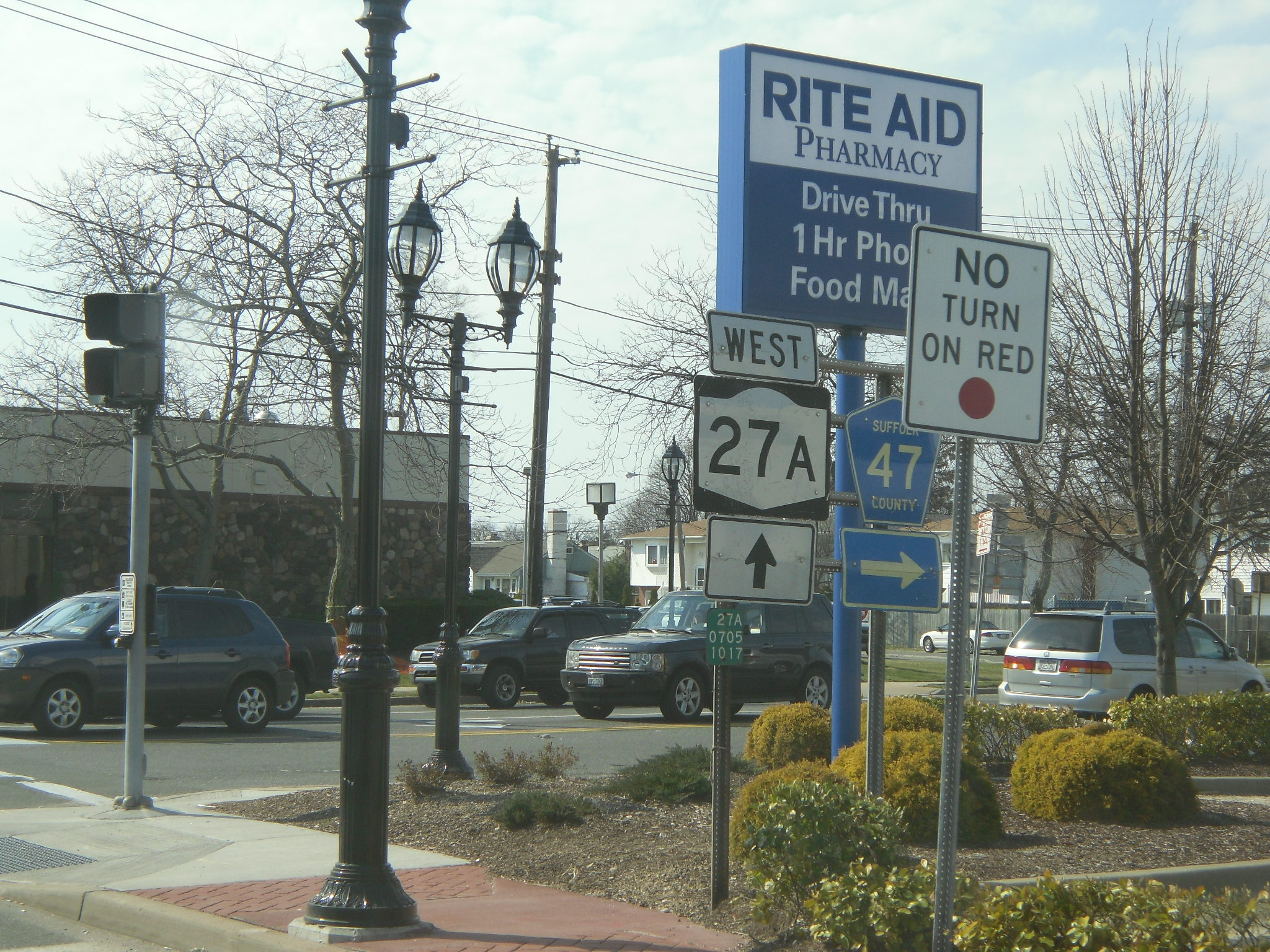
NY 27A westbound at the junction with CR 47 in Copiague

NY 27A begins at a large junction between NY 27 (the Sunrise Highway) in front of the former Sunrise Mall site in the town of Oyster Bay, just east of Massapequa. NY 27A proceeds east along Old Sunrise Highway for one block, turning south on Carman Mill Road (former NY 276), which consists of several blocks of residential homes and passing a local school. Several blocks to the south, NY 27A intersects with Merrick Road at a t-intersection. At Merrick Road, NY 27A turns east off Carman Mill and onto Merrick, a four-lane boulevard through the town of Oyster Bay and the hamlet of East Massapequa. NY 27A is commercial for a long distance across East Massapequa, soon bending northeast into an intersection with County Route 1 (County Line Road).

At the intersection with CR 1, NY 27A and Merrick Road cross into Suffolk County and the village of Amityville in the town of Babylon. Now just a two-lane arterial through Amityville, NY 27A crosses east through a commercial section, intersecting with the southern terminus of NY 110 (Broadway) and bending southeast at an intersection with Richmond Avenue. Crossing over a small waterway that drains into the Great South Bay, the route passes south of Amityville Memorial High School. After crossing another waterway, NY 27A crosses into the town of Babylon. Now in the Copiague section of Babylon, the route proceeds northeast through Copiague, intersecting with the southern end of CR 47 (Great Neck Road). Once again a four-lane boulevard, NY 27A crosses into the village of Lindenhurst, now boasting the West Montauk Highway moniker.

NY 27A through Lindenhurst remains commercial, passing several ocean-side marinas on the eastbound side of the highway. At the intersection with the southern terminus of CR 3 (South Wellwood Avenue), the name flips to East Montauk Highway as NY 27A continues northeast through Lindenhurst. At Park Avenue, the route passes south of a long strip mall along the north side of the roadway, crossing into the village of Babylon. Now in Babylon, the route switches back to West Montauk Highway once again, crossing an intersection with CR 96 (Great East Neck Road) and through the Bergen Point Golf Course. At Beachwood Drive, the route bends further towards the northeast, becoming a residential street through Babylon.

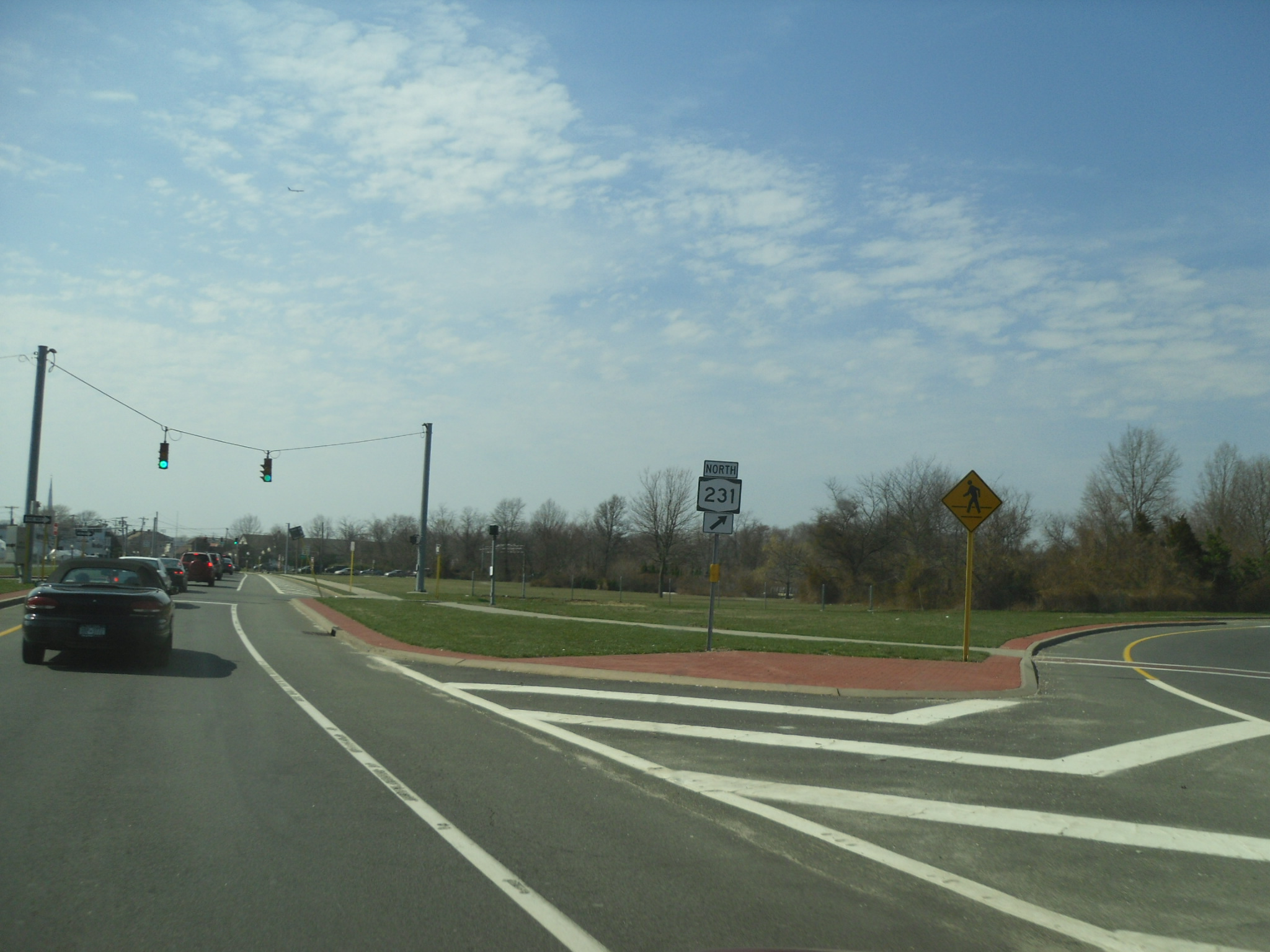
NY 27A westbound at the junction with NY 231 in Babylon

Now in the Deer Pen section of Babylon, NY 27A changes monikers to West Main Street, crossing into Argyle Park and an intersection with the eastern terminus of NY 109 (Little East Neck Road North). Bending a little to the east, NY 27A becomes a four-lane boulevard across the southern end of Argyle County Park. Crossing into downtown Babylon, NY 27A becomes a two-lane commercial street, flipping to East Main Street at Deer Park Avenue. After bending eastward, the route runs along the southern end of Hawleys Lake Park and the southern terminus of NY 231 (the Babylon–Northport Expressway). The interchange with NY 231 divides the eastbound and westbound lanes of NY 27A, which crossed into the town of Islip.

Now named Montauk Highway, NY 27A bends southeast past an intersection with the southern end of CR 82 (Higbie Lane). The route crosses east through Islip, passing south of Lake Capri, and bending northeast at Everdell Avenue. After passing Captree Elementary School, NY 27A enters exit RM2 of the Robert Moses Causeway, crossing into West Bay Shore on the other side of the parkway. At Lake View Road, the route changes monikers to South Country Road and passing north Gardiners County Park. Running northeast for a short distance through West Bay Shore, NY 27A winds past Southward Ho Country Club as a two-lane residential road. The route crosses into Brightwaters before passing back into Bay Shore.

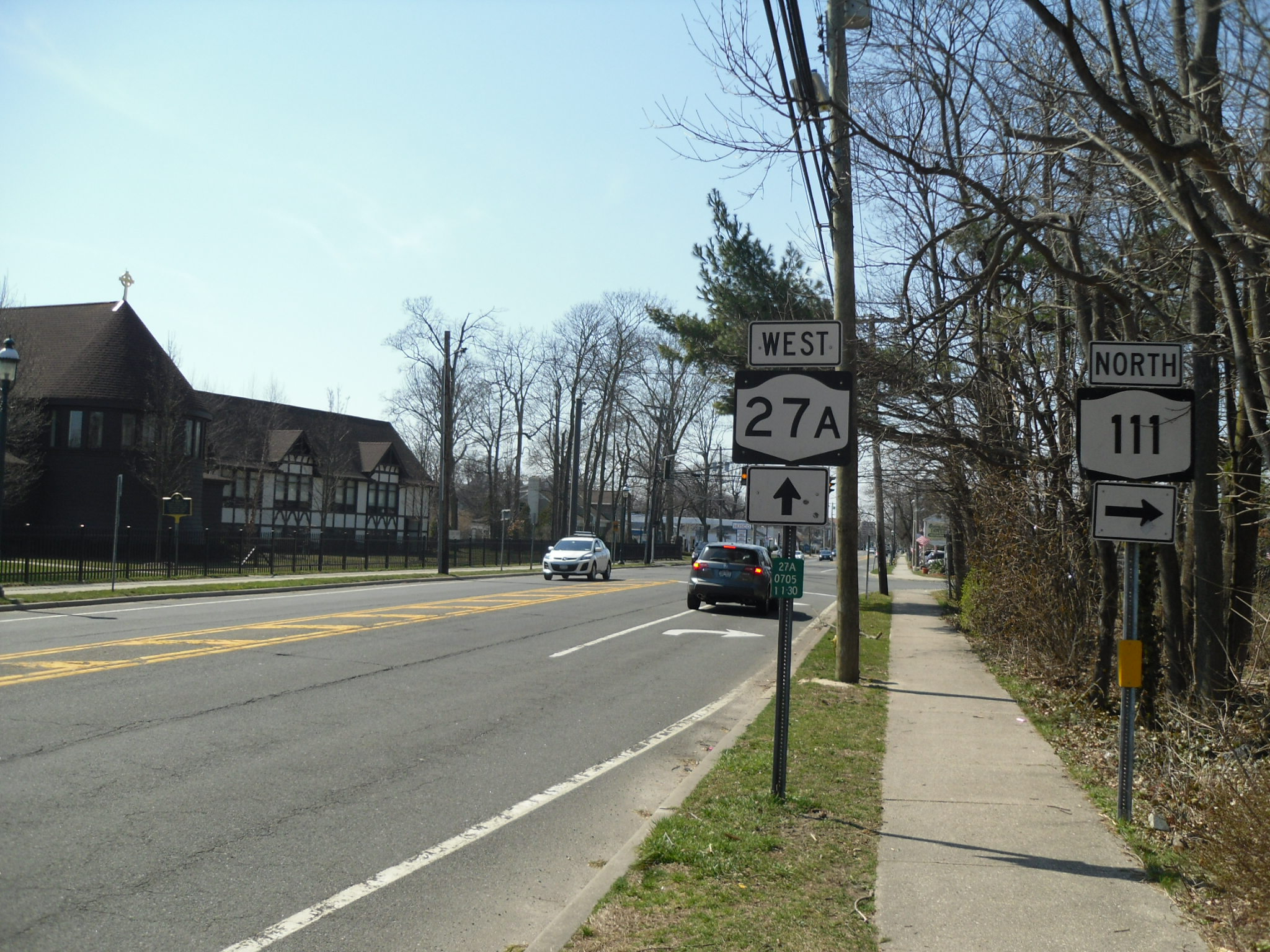
NY 27A westbound at the junction with NY 111 in Islip

In Bay Shore, NY 27A crosses an intersection with the southern terminus of CR 13A (Clinton Avenue) and soon CR 13 (Fifth Avenue). Now known as West Main Street, NY 27A crosses through downtown Islip, changing to East Main at Fourth Avenue. The route soon bends eastward past Orowoc Lake, passing several commercial businesses in both directions. The route intersects with Nassau Avenue in front of Islip Town Hall before intersecting with the southern terminus of NY 111 (Islip Avenue). Passing Brookwood Hall Park, the route crosses into East Islip, retaining the West Main Street name, remaining a two-lane commercial street. Crossing the southern terminus of CR 17 (Carelton Avenue), NY 27A changes names to East Main Street, crossing through the Country Village section of East Islip.

After Country Village, NY 27A bends northeast into exit 45 of the Heckscher State Parkway, a cloverleaf interchange and into the Bayard Cutting Arboretum State Park. Now in Great River, NY 27A bends northeast as Montauk Highway, junctioning with the eastern terminus of CR 50 (Union Boulevard). After crossing into North Great River, the route winds through the park as a two-lane roadway, paralleling the Montauk Branch of the Long Island Rail Road. NY 27A then reaches exit 46 of NY 27 (Sunrise Highway), entering Great River. At this interchange, NY 27A terminates, while CR 85 continues east along Montauk Highway.

== History ==
=== Designation and initial extension ===
The entirety of modern NY 27A east of Carman Mill Road was originally designated as part of NY 27 in the mid-1920s. West of Carman Mill Road, NY 27 followed Merrick Road through southern Nassau County to the New York City line, where it ended. Carman Mill Road was originally designated as NY 276 from c. 1941 until the late 1940s. NY 27 was realigned between New York City and Great River c. 1931 to follow Sunrise Highway. The Suffolk County portion of its former alignment on Merrick Road and Montauk Highway was designated as NY 27A. At the Nassau–Suffolk county line, NY 27A turned to follow County Line Road north to NY 27.

NY 27A was one of a handful of routes that was extended into New York City in mid-December 1934. Following the extension, it began at NY 1A (Varick Street) in Lower Manhattan and followed Broome, Kenmare, and Delancey Streets east to the Williamsburg Bridge leading to Brooklyn. After crossing the East River, it went generally southeastward through Brooklyn on Grant Street, Bushwick Avenue, Highland Boulevard, Force Tube Avenue, Ridgewood Avenue, and Rockaway Boulevard. Force Tube and Ridgewood Avenues, both one way, eastbound-only streets, made up half of a one-way couplet that also utilized the westbound-only Eldert Lane and Etna Street. As a result, Force Tube and Ridgewood Avenues carried NY 27A eastbound while Eldert Lane and Etna Street handled NY 27A westbound.

In Queens, NY 27A was routed on Rockaway, Baisley, and Merrick Boulevards to the eastern borough line, where it continued eastward into Nassau County on the original alignment of NY 27 on Merrick Road. The route remained on Merrick Road to the Suffolk County line, where it joined its original alignment. NY 27 and NY 27A crossed paths in Rockville Centre, where the Sunrise Highway intersected Merrick Road.

=== New York City ===
In the mid-1940s, NY 27A was rerouted within Brooklyn and Queens. It now began at the junction of Tillary Street and Flatbush Avenue (NY 27) in Brooklyn and followed Tillary, Jay, and Smith Streets to Atlantic Avenue, then continued on Atlantic Avenue and Hicks Street to the Gowanus Parkway. NY 27A was then routed on the Gowanus, Shore and Southern Parkways through southern Brooklyn and Queens. NY 27A, concurrent to NY 27 from the western extent of the Southern Parkway, continued to follow NY 27 and the Sunrise Highway to Rockville Centre in Nassau County, where it split from NY 27 to follow Merrick Road.

NY 27A was re-extended into Manhattan in the 1950s. Instead of leaving the Gowanus Parkway at Hicks Street, it continued north on the Gowanus Parkway and passed through the Brooklyn–Battery Tunnel under the East River. Once in Manhattan, it followed the West Side Elevated Highway through the borough's West Side to Canal Street, where the Elevated Highway became NY 9A. On January 1, 1970, NY 27A was truncated to its current western terminus in Massapequa. The portion of NY 27A's former routing north of the interchange between the Gowanus and Prospect Expressways became an extension of NY 27.

=== Suffolk County ===
East of Great River, NY 27 originally followed Montauk Highway to Montauk Point. NY 27A was extended eastward along Montauk Highway to Patchogue in the early 1950s after NY 27 was realigned to follow a new highway between Great River and Patchogue. A controlled-access extension of NY 27 to Shirley opened to traffic in the late 1950s, at which time NY 27A was extended eastward along NY 27's former routing to meet NY 27 in Shirley. Construction on a new alignment for NY 27 between NY 24 in Hampton Bays and Montauk Highway near Water Mill began by 1961 and was completed c. 1962. The former routing of NY 27 between the two locations became part of NY 27A, even though it did not connect to any other part of the route.

Work was underway by 1962 on an extension of the Patchogue–Shirley controlled-access highway to the vicinity of Eastport. This roadway was completed as a realignment of NY 27 by 1964, allowing NY 27A to be extended once more along NY 27's old routing. NY 27A was also extended east along NY 27 to connect to the segment of NY 27A between Hampton Bays and Water Mill. Ownership and maintenance of Montauk Highway between Great River and the town of Southampton was gradually transferred from the state of New York to Suffolk County during the 1960s and 1970s. The portion from the Patchogue village line east to NY 24 in Hampton Bays was turned over to the county on October 6, 1966, while the segment between NY 24 and Knoll Road was given to Suffolk County on February 15, 1968.

Although most of Montauk Highway between Patchogue and the village of Southampton was now maintained by the county, NY 27A continued to follow the road eastward to NY 27 northeast of Southampton. It was finally cut back to its current eastern terminus in Great River on March 29, 1972, after ownership and maintenance of Montauk Highway between Great River and Patchogue was transferred from the state to the county. NY 27A's former routing is now CR 80 from the east village line of Patchogue to Knoll Road, CR 85 from Great River to the west village line of Patchogue, and NY 900W, an unsigned reference route, from Knoll Road to the west village line of Southampton at Tuckahoe Lane.

In 1969, the Suffolk County Department of Planning proposed a major reconstruction project of downtown Bay Shore in cooperation with the New York State Department of Transportation. The project, dubbed the "Bay Shore Split", would reroute eastbound and westbound traffic on new alignments running to the north and south of Main Street (NY 27A) and convert Main Street into a pedestrian mall with parking garages at key locations. The plan was cancelled as a result of public opposition.

== NY 27A Truck ==
New York State Route 27A Truck
- Location: Moriches
- Existed: 1958–1972

NY 27A Truck was a truck route of NY 27A in that bypassed the hamlet of Center Moriches to the north. It followed the Moriches Bypass (Frowein Road) between Moriches and East Moriches and was co-designated as CR 98 by Suffolk County. NY 27A Truck ceased to exist after NY 27A was truncated on its eastern end to Great River in 1972.

The NY 27A Truck designation partially resurfaced during the early 1970s as "Temporary NY 27A Truck". It was routed along NY 24, NY 27, and North Shore Road and served as a bypass for trucks around a reconstruction project along NY 27A between Hampton Bays and Shinnecock Hills.

== Major intersections ==
County	Location	mi	km	Destinations	Notes
Nassau	East Massapequa	0.00	0.00	NY 27 (Sunrise Highway)	Western terminus
Suffolk	Amityville	1.57	2.53	NY 110 north	Southern terminus of NY 110
Suffolk	Village of Babylon	6.41	10.32	NY 109 west – Farmingdale	Eastern terminus of NY 109
Suffolk	Village of Babylon	7.30	11.75	NY 231 north – Huntington	Southern terminus of NY 231
Suffolk	West Islip	8.87	14.27	Robert Moses Causeway to Southern State Parkway – Ocean Beaches	Exits RM2E-W on Robert Moses Causeway
Suffolk	Community of Islip	13.95	22.45	NY 111 north (Islip Avenue)	Southern terminus of NY 111
Suffolk	East Islip			CR 17 north (Carleton Avenue)	Southern terminus of CR 17; former NY 111
Suffolk	East Islip	15.90	25.59	Heckscher State Parkway to NY 27 – New York, Heckscher Park	Exits 45W-E on Heckscher State Parkway
Suffolk	Great River	17.31	27.86	CR 85 east (Montauk Highway)	Continuation east; former NY 27
1.000 mi = 1.609 km; 1.000 km = 0.621 mi: Incomplete access
