= National Register of Historic Places listings in Islip (town), New York =

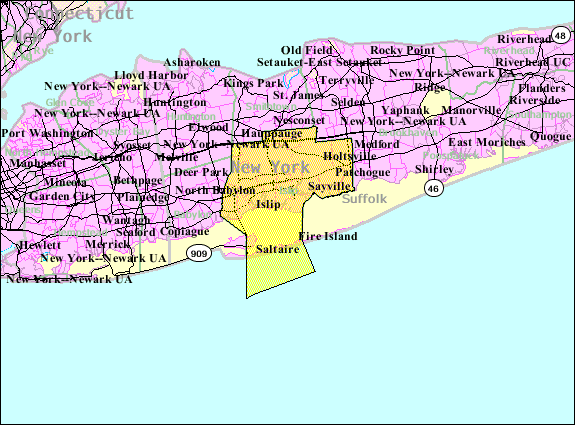
Map showing Islip in central Long Island

This is a list of the National Register of Historic Places listings in the Town of Islip, New York

This list is intended to provide a comprehensive listing of entries in the National Register of Historic Places in Town of Islip, New York. The locations of National Register properties for which the latitude and longitude coordinates are included below, may be seen in an online map.

== Listings ==
	Name on the Register	Image	Date listed	Location	City or town	Description
1	Bay Shore Hose Company No. 1 Firehouse	Bay Shore Hose Company No. 1 Firehouse	August 15, 2001 (#01000851)	Second Avenue; 40°43′29″N 73°14′46″W	Bay Shore	
2	Bay Shore Methodist Episcopal Church	Bay Shore Methodist Episcopal Church	August 15, 2001 (#01000847)	East Main Street, jct. Second Avenue; 40°43′24″N 73°14′45″W	Bay Shore	
3	Bayard Cutting Estate	Bayard Cutting Estate	October 2, 1973 (#73001271)	NY 27A, Great River; 40°44′09″N 73°09′45″W	Great River	Part of Bayard Cutting Arboretum State Park
4	Cerny's Bakery	Cerny's Bakery	August 17, 2020 (#100005450)	1165 Smithtown Ave. 40°46′17″N 73°06′32″W	Bohemia	Former Czech-American bakery, currently a residence.
5	Davis Field	Davis Field	January 22, 2008 (#07001456)	2nd Street & 3rd Avenue; 40°45′30″N 73°03′12″W	Bayport	Also known as Bayport Aerodrome
6	The Edwards House	The Edwards House	December 7, 2010 (#10000988)	39 Edwards St. 40°43′53″N 73°04′47″W	Sayville	Headquarters of the Sayville Historical Society
7	Fire Island Light Station	Fire Island Light Station	September 11, 1981 (#81000082)	Robert Moses Causeway; 40°37′55″N 73°13′08″W	Bay Shore	Fire Island Light Station Historic District boundary increase (listed January 29, 2010, refnum 09001288): Burma Rd., Fire Island
8	First Congregational Church of Bay Shore	First Congregational Church of Bay Shore	May 3, 2002 (#02000448)	1860 Union Boulevard; 40°43′33″N 73°14′46″W	Bay Shore	
9	Rafael Guastavino Jr. House	Rafael Guastavino Jr. House	December 11, 2013 (#13000912)	143 Awixa Avenue; 40°43′00″N 73°14′03″W	Bay Shore	Unique Mediterranean-style house built in 1914, faced in fireproof ceramic tile, by inventor of tile.
10	Modern Times School	Modern Times School	December 23, 1994 (#94001478)	Jct. of Third Avenue and First Street; 40°46′36″N 73°15′16″W	Brentwood	
11	MODESTY (south-sider sloop)	MODESTY (south-sider sloop)	August 7, 2001 (#01001051)	86 West Avenue, Long Island Maritime Museum; 40°43′22″N 73°05′43″W	West Sayville	
12	John Mollenhauer House	John Mollenhauer House	September 3, 2014 (#14000540)	60 Awixa Ave. 40°43′21″N 73°14′06″W	Bay Shore	1893 home of "Sugar King of Brooklyn" is excellent example of Shingle style estate
13	Jacob Ockers House	Jacob Ockers House	July 10, 1992 (#92000838)	965 Montauk Highway; 40°44′21″N 73°07′23″W	Oakdale	
14	Priscilla (Long Island Sound Oyster Sloop)	Priscilla (Long Island Sound Oyster Sloop)	February 17, 2006 (#06000238)	Waterfront, Long Island Maritime Museum, 86 West Avenue; 40°43′21″N 73°05′45″W	West Sayville	
15	John Ellis Roosevelt Estate	John Ellis Roosevelt Estate	November 5, 1987 (#87001896)	Middle Road; 40°44′22″N 73°04′19″W	Sayville	On the grounds of Sans Soucci Lakes County Park
16	Rudolph Oyster House	Rudolph Oyster House	August 7, 2001 (#01001052)	86 West Avenue, Long Island Maritime Museum; 40°43′21″N 73°05′45″W	West Sayville	
17	Sagtikos Manor	Sagtikos Manor	November 21, 1976 (#76001284)	Montauk Highway (NY 27A); 40°42′10″N 73°16′36″W	West Bay Shore	
18	St. Ann's Episcopal Church	St. Ann's Episcopal Church	August 30, 2010 (#10000611)	257 Middle Rd. 40°44′09″N 73°04′24″W	Sayville	From Isaac Henry Green, Jr. Suffolk and Nassau Counties, New York MPS. (Official Site).
19	St. Johns Episcopal Church and Cemetery	St. Johns Episcopal Church and Cemetery	January 28, 1994 (#93001559)	Montauk Highway Northeast side, about 300' Northwest of the jct. with Locust Avenue; 40°44′07″N 73°07′02″W	Oakdale	
20	Sayville Congregational Church	Sayville Congregational Church	July 27, 2005 (#05000747)	131 Middle Road; 40°44′11″N 73°04′50″W	Sayville	
21	Sisters of St. Joseph Motherhouse, Brentwood	Sisters of St. Joseph Motherhouse, Brentwood	May 7, 2018 (#100002388)	1725 Brentwood Rd. 40°46′22″N 73°14′27″W	Brentwood	See this link
22	Southside Sportsmens Club District	Southside Sportsmens Club District	July 23, 1973 (#73001272)	Northeast of Great River, off NY 27; 40°45′01″N 73°09′02″W	Great River	Part of Connetquot River State Park Preserve
23	US Post Office-Bay Shore	US Post Office-Bay Shore	November 17, 1988 (#88002455)	10 Bay Shore Avenue; 40°43′23″N 73°14′41″W	Bay Shore	
24	Wereholme	Wereholme	January 4, 2007 (#06001208)	550 South Bay Avenue; 40°42′48″N 73°12′50″W	Islip	Also known as the Harold H. Weekes Estate. Now part of the Seatuck National Wildlife Refuge.
25	Winganhauppauge	Winganhauppauge	November 15, 2010 (#10000912)	77 St. Marks Lane; 40°43′32″N 73°12′15″W	Islip	
26	Joseph Wood House	Joseph Wood House	May 18, 2003 (#03000406)	284 Greene Avenue; 40°44′09″N 73°04′33″W	Sayville	

== See also ==
- National Register of Historic Places listings in New York
- National Register of Historic Places listings in Suffolk County, New York
