= Connetquot School District =

School district in the U.S. state of New York

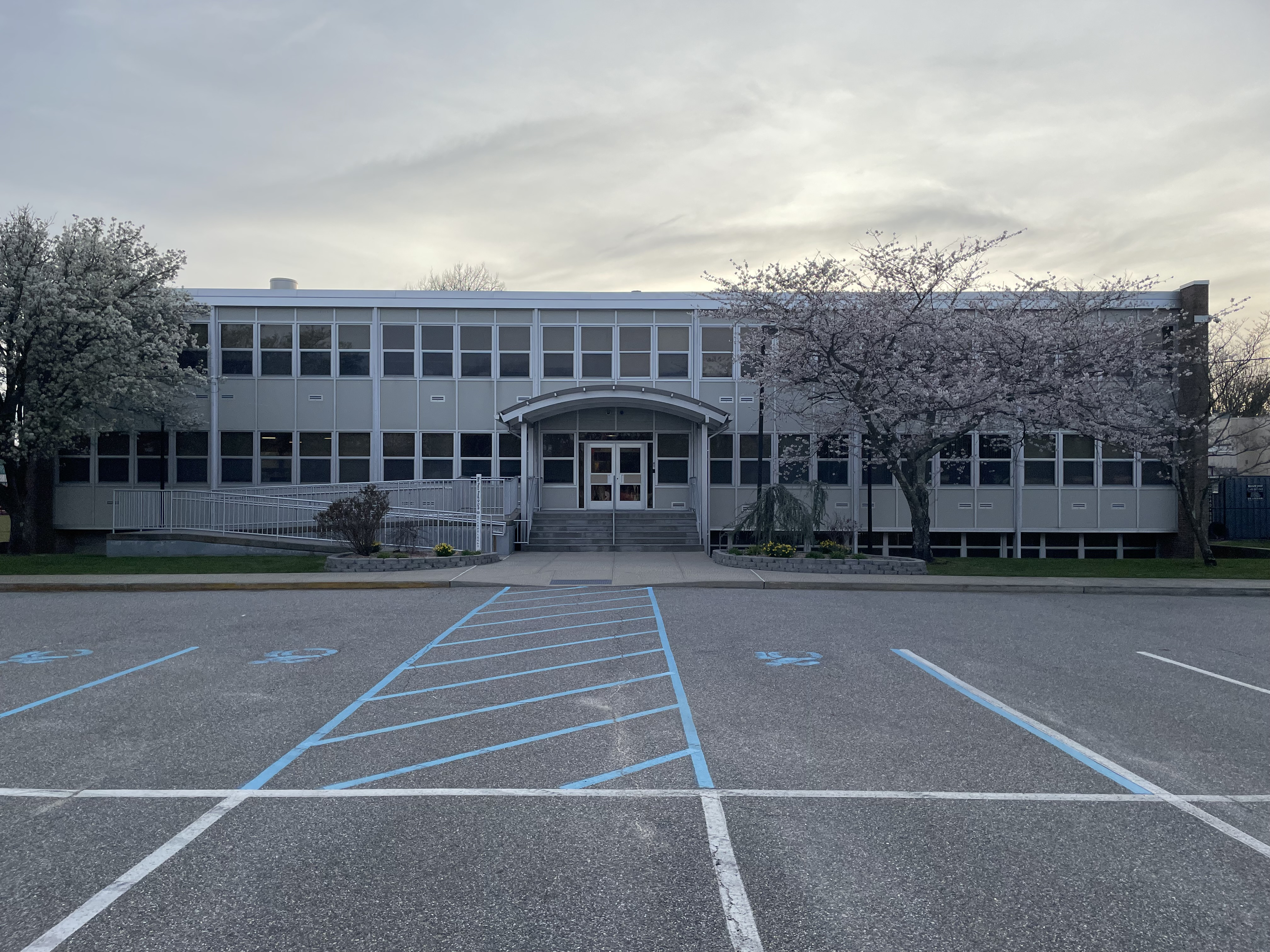
- The Connetquot Central School District's administration building, located in Bohemia

Location
- Town of Islip, Suffolk County, New York United States

District information
- Type: Public
- Motto: Excellence in Education
- Grades: PreK-12
- Established: 1963
- Superintendent: Dr. Joseph Centamore
- Asst. superintendent(s): Christina Poppe, Reza Kolahifar, Robert Hauser
- Schools: 10

Students and staff
- Students: 5,393 (2022-2023)
- District mascot: Thunderbirds
- Colors: Red and white

Other information
- Website: ccsdli.org

The Connetquot Central School District of Islip is a school district located in the Town of Islip of Suffolk County, New York on the South Shore of Long Island. There is one preschool, seven elementary schools, two middle schools, and one senior high school.

The district includes the entirety of the community of Oakdale and almost all of Ronkonkoma and Bohemia, while it also serves parts of Islandia, Sayville, and West Sayville. Most parts of Sayville and West Sayville are zoned to the neighboring Sayville School District, and other portions of Islandia are served by the Hauppauge Union Free School District and the Central Islip Union Free School District.

== History ==
=== Early history ===
In the early years of education in the area, Oakdale and Bohemia (both controlled by Connetquot today) were originally in the East Islip School District. This was the configuration until 1836, when Oakdale gained its own district. In the mid-to-late 19th century, the area that would eventually become the Connetquot Central School District was occupied by three districts; #11 Lakeland (founded in 1855), #14 Bohemia (founded in 1866), and #7 Oakdale (founded in 1836). Oakdale and Bohemia both came out of the East Islip district, and Ronkonkoma came from the old school district of Holbrook, which today is part of Sachem. The districts had just 16, 35, and 49 students respectively in 1883. Bohemia would grow continuously over the years, and absorbed part of Lakeland in 1866. The name was changed from Lakeland to Ronkonkoma in 1867. Many students in these early districts went to Sayville School District schools, including Sayville High School. Oakdale and Bohemia consolidated in 1918, becoming Oakdale-Bohemia, also known as Union Free School District #7.

=== Consolidation and contemporary history ===
In 1960, with continuing suburban growth, voters in the existing Oakdale-Bohemia and Ronkonkoma school districts voted to consolidate their two districts, which paved the way for construction of a high school and the modern Connetquot Central School District #7. The name of the district was derived from the Connetquot River.

In January 1962, the entire district was shuttered for a week due to an outbreak of scarlet fever.

In July 2007, the school district received national attention when two teenagers who attended Connetquot High School were arrested for planning an attack on the school mirroring that of Columbine. The plans, discovered in a notebook left in a Bohemia parking lot, reportedly included a hit list of students and staff and how to ignite explosives. One of the teenagers involved in the plot, Christopher Franko, was arrested again in June 2010 for planning a similar attack. The plan failed when Franko and another conspirator were denied the purchase of a shotgun, and turned over to Suffolk County Police.

The district closed all of its schools on October 29, 2012 and the following days as a result of Hurricane Sandy.

At the start of the 2018 school year, Oakdale-Bohemia Middle School faced widespread mold growth, leading to many parents' concern with their children's safety.

In May 2019, three students of Connetquot High School were arrested for discussing plans to detonate explosives at the school. The three were discussing their plans on a school bus, when another student heard them, and reported the conversation to an administrator. The administrator then reported the incident to Suffolk County Police, and the school was evacuated. The entire conversation was caught on the school bus's surveillance system. Police also found a copy of The Anarchist Cookbook, a book with bomb-making instructions, in one of the conspirators' homes. The three were taken into custody and charged with conspiracy.

Like most school districts in the United States, Connetquot temporarily closed its schools in March 2020 due to the COVID-19 pandemic. In March 2023, the district faced widespread protests both in and outside their schools, after it was believed by the community that they had ordered the resignation of Connetquot High School's principal.

In January 2024, the Government of New York State mandated that all new school buses purchased by the district, from 2027 onward, be electric. The following month, the district was one of the beneficiaries of a government program that guarantees free school lunch for students.

==== Mascot lawsuit ====
In October 2023, the district filed a lawsuit against the New York State Board of Regents, which had tried to enforce a ban on the use of Native American folklore for school mascots. The district was ordered to remove all names, imagery and mascots relating to the thunderbird from its schools by June 2025. Connetquot schools had used the thunderbird, or "T-Bird" as it is often called in Connetquot, as their school mascot since the 1960s. When the lawsuit was filed, the district argued the ban was unconstitutional. By September 2025, overwhelming popular support by the community, as well as Indigenous Americans, for keeping the T-Bird mascot led to a vote that allowed the district to keep the mascot on the condition that the name be formally changed from "thunderbird" to "T-Bird".

==== Pride flag policy lawsuit ====
In January 2024, a lawsuit was filed against the school district as a result of their pride flag policy. The district's ban on displaying the flags in school had already caused controversy prior to the lawsuit. The lawsuit was initiated by an openly homosexual teacher of Connetquot High School, who claimed the district's policy regarding the flags was discriminatory against LGBT students, teachers and staff. One of the defendants named in the case was Connetquot High School's Principal, Michael Moran, despite it being widely believed that his resignation in March 2023 was a result of his support for displaying pride flags in the school. The lawsuit was dismissed in April 2025.

== Demographics ==
The total enrollment of the 2022–2023 school year among Connetquot's ten schools was 5,393 students.

Data from USN states that Connetquot District's students are 51% male and 49% female. The majority of students are white, with a 69.4% majority. Furthermore, 19% of students are Hispanic, 6% are Asian, 3.2% are black, and 2% are of mixed race. The website also says that 16.6% of students are "economically disadvantaged".

== Schools ==
The following is a list of schools in the Connetquot Central School District.

- Edward J. Bosti Elementary School (PK–5) – Oakdale
- Cherokee Street Elementary School (K–5) – Ronkonkoma
- Helen B. Duffield Elementary School (K–5) – Ronkonkoma
- Idle Hour Elementary School (K–5) – Oakdale
- John Pearl Elementary School (K–5) – Bohemia
- Edith L. Slocum Elementary School (K–5) – Ronkonkoma
- Sycamore Avenue Elementary School (K–5) – Bohemia
- Oakdale-Bohemia Middle School (6–8) – Oakdale
- Ronkonkoma Middle School (6–8) – Ronkonkoma
- Connetquot High School (9–12) – Bohemia

== See also ==
- Middle Country Central School District
- Sachem School District
