= Pete D'Alessandro =

American sports executive (born 1968)

Orlando Magic
- Position: Vice president of basketball operations
- League: NBA

Personal information
- Born: June 17, 1968 (age 58) Bohemia, New York, U.S.

Career information
- High school: Connetquot (Bohemia, New York)
- College: St. John’s University, Nova Southeastern University School of Law

Pete D’Alessandro (born June 17, 1968) is an American businessman, currently the executive vice president of basketball operations for the Orlando Magic of the National Basketball Association (NBA). Prior to joining the Magic, D’Alessandro was the general manager for the Sacramento Kings and an assistant general manager with the Golden State Warriors and Denver Nuggets twice.

== Early life and career ==
D’Alessandro attended Connetquot High School in Bohemia, New York. He enrolled at St. John's University in 1986. While there, D’Alessandro began his work in basketball as a video coordinator under St. John's Hall of Fame men's basketball coach Lou Carnesecca. He later graduated from Nova Southeastern University School of Law in May 1994 and was admitted to the New York State Bar in 1995.

From 1997 to 2004, D’Alessandro worked for Professional Management Associates, a Washington, DC–based sports agency, where he represented NBA and international basketball players.

== NBA executive career ==
=== Golden State Warriors (2004–2010) ===
He was hired by Golden State Warriors basketball chief and Hall of Famer Chris Mullin in 2004 to join the Golden State Warriors as the director of basketball operations. Golden State promoted D’Alessandro to assistant general manager in 2006. D’Alessandro became known for his strong analytical skills and expertise in the NBA salary cap.

=== Denver Nuggets (2010–2012) ===
In 2010, D’Alessandro was recruited away by the newly hired GM of the Denver Nuggets, Masai Ujiri, to work for him as his advisor. In 2012, he was promoted to Vice President of Basketball Operations. He helped the Nuggets to a franchise record 57 regular season wins that year. After Ujiri left for the Toronto Raptors, D’Alessandro was initially seen as the front runner for the general manager position of the Nuggets.

=== Sacramento Kings (2013–2015) ===
On June 17, 2013, he was hired as the new general manager of the Sacramento Kings by new majority owner Vivek Ranadive. D'Alessandro pledged to aggressively pursue deals as the Kings GM and followed through on that with three major trades in the first five months of his tenure, including a 7-player trade with his former boss Ujiri in Toronto.

=== Return to Denver (2015–2017) ===
On June 10, 2015, D'Alessandro left the Sacramento Kings to accept a front office position as the senior vice president of business and team operations with the Denver Nuggets. D’Alessandro had a chance to return to his alma mater, St. John's, as athletic director, but chose to stay in the NBA. St. John's coach Chris Mullin had been pushing the university to bring D’Alessandro on board as AD, and the school had discussed contract terms with D’Alessandro.

=== Orlando Magic (since 2017) ===
On June 10, 2017, it was announced that D'Alessandro would take on a new position as assistant general manager for the Orlando Magic.

During the 2019-2020 NBA season, D’Alessandro played a key role in responding to NBA memos relating to the COVID-19 pandemic and the 2020 NBA Bubble. D’Alessandro essentially served as an interpreter, translating complicated legalese into something the franchise can act on. “That’s why I say Pete is the most valuable player of the bubble for the Orlando Magic,” said Jeff Weltman, the team's president of basketball operations.

== Personal life ==
D’Alessandro resides in the Orlando area with his wife Leah.
