= J. C. Lore Oyster House =

- U.S. National Register of Historic Places
- U.S. National Historic Landmark
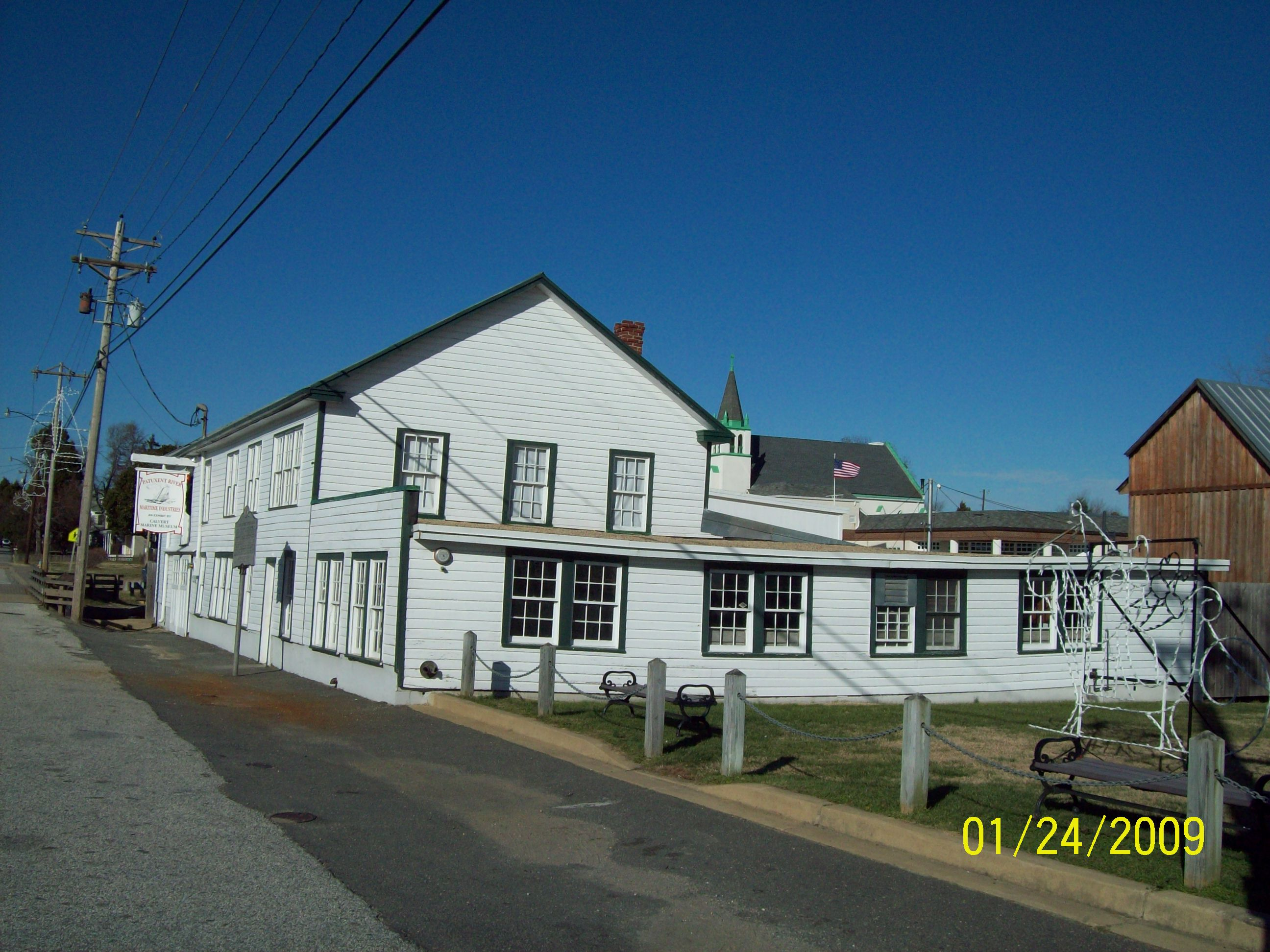
- J.C. Lore Oyster House - South View, December 2008

- Location within Maryland Location within the United States
- Location: 14430 Solomons Island Road, South, MD 2, Solomons, Maryland
- Coordinates: 38°19′27″N 76°27′39″W
- Area: 0.266 acres (1,080 m^{2})
- Built: 1934
- Architect: J.B. Lusby
- NRHP reference No.: 84003869

Significant dates
- Added to NRHP: March 22, 1984
- Designated NHL: August 7, 2001

J. C. Lore Oyster House, also known as J. C. Lore and Sons, Inc., Seafood Packing Plant, is located at 14430 Solomons Island Road South, in Solomons, Calvert County, Maryland. It is a large two story, rectangular frame industrial building constructed in 1934 as a seafood packing plant. It replaced a 1922 building that was destroyed by the 1933 Chesapeake Potomac hurricane. It is significant for its historical association with the commercial fisheries of Maryland's Patuxent River region, and architecturally as a substantially unaltered example of an early-20th century seafood packing plant. It has been adapted by the Calvert Marine Museum to house exhibits and many of its original spaces, artifacts, and records have been incorporated into them.

It was listed on the National Register of Historic Places in 1984, and declared a National Historic Landmark in 2001.

== History and significance ==
The J.C. Lore Company was a principal supplier of oysters to the Acme Markets and Kroger companies under the "Patuxent" brand in the midwestern United States. The J.C. Lore Oyster House is one of five nationally important properties associated with the oyster-processing industry. The Rudolph Oyster House in West Sayville, New York, Thomas Oyster House in Mystic, Connecticut, the Oyster Barge in New Haven, Connecticut and the Platt & Co. Cannery in Baltimore, Maryland are noted as complementary examples of oyster-related landmarks.

The Lore company was founded by Joseph Cobb Lore (1863–1945), who arrived in Solomons in 1888 from Newport, New Jersey to buy and ship oysters to Philadelphia. Lore established his own oyster packing house in Solomons in 1922, but it was destroyed by the powerful 1933 hurricane, and was rebuilt in 1934. His sons, J.C. Lore, Jr. and G.I. Rupert Lore managed the business together until 1961, when Rupert started his own operation in St. Mary's County. The Lore Company also packed crabmeat from 1925 to 1945, as well as fish. Other ventures included boat rental, charter fishing, a bait store, a company store and a school boat, which was considered more useful than a school bus in the locale.

The Lore Company maintained a fleet of three boats for oyster buying and planting. Two boats, the William B. Tennison and the Sidney B. Riggin, were converted bugeyes, former sailing oyster dredges. The Tennison is now itself a national Historic Landmark and is preserved at the museum. A third vessel, the Pengui, was a Hooper Island draketail workboat.

The Lore company ceased business in 1978, a victim of declining harvests and shortages of cheap labor.

== Description ==
The J.C. Lore Oyster House is located on an island in the Patuxent River near the point at which the Patuxent enters Chesapeake Bay. The island is partly artificial, built up from oyster shells produced by the 1918 Woodburn and 1922 Lore oyster houses. The present 1934 structure is a two-story building or somewhat irregular plan, clad in novelty-style wood siding, with a metal roof. The portion of the walls below the roof is concrete to minimize storm damage from flooding. A one-story shed-roofed wing extends to the south, while a 1965 concrete block addition covers two thirds of the rear elevation. Windows are irregularly placed, reflecting the functional requirements of the interior spaces. Interior walls are framed with horizontal planks, with beaded tongue and groove ceilings. Floors are concrete slabs, some of which are sloped for drainage, typically with a high point at the center of the room.

The chief interior spaces are arranged for receiving, shucking, processing and packing oysters. A storage area on the upper level is provided for cans and boxes, together with office space. The property is arranged with a bulkhead to the rear of the building where buy-boats and independent oystermen could tie up and unload. Between 1945 and 1965 it was possible to hoist oysters directly out of a boat and into the receiving area through an overhang over the water. Oysters were moved from the receiving room in wheelbarrows, while shells of shucked oysters were moved outside on a conveyor belt. The two shucking rooms are long and narrow, with concrete shucking tables around the perimeter, and could accommodate fifty shuckers. The shuckers stood a three-sided shucking stands, taking whole oysters from the tables, opening them on the stand, and letting the shells fall away to the outside, the stands protecting the shuckers from the sharp-edged shells even when the piles of shells were several feet deep. The shuckers stood on an adjustable platform that kept their feet off the cold, wet floor.

Buckets of shucked oysters were passed through a window into the processing room, where they were rinsed, weighed and tallied. Shuckers were paid by the weight or volume of oyster meat produced. Oyster meats were rinsed on a perforated "skimmer table" to remove grit, shell and worms.. A "blow tank" was used to rinse the oyster meats using aerated water. Oysters were drained on a second skimmer table. The meats were sorted by size and packed in metal cans, which were then steam-sterilized. The J.C. Lore processing room retains its complement of this equipment.

The building remains as it was in 1965 when some system renovation took place and a fire-suppression sprinkler system was installed. The museum has built a theater in one of the cold storage rooms for interpretation, and the southern shucking room is used as a classroom. The company store that stood nearby was demolished in 1995, prior to the museum's acquisition of the property.

== Gallery ==
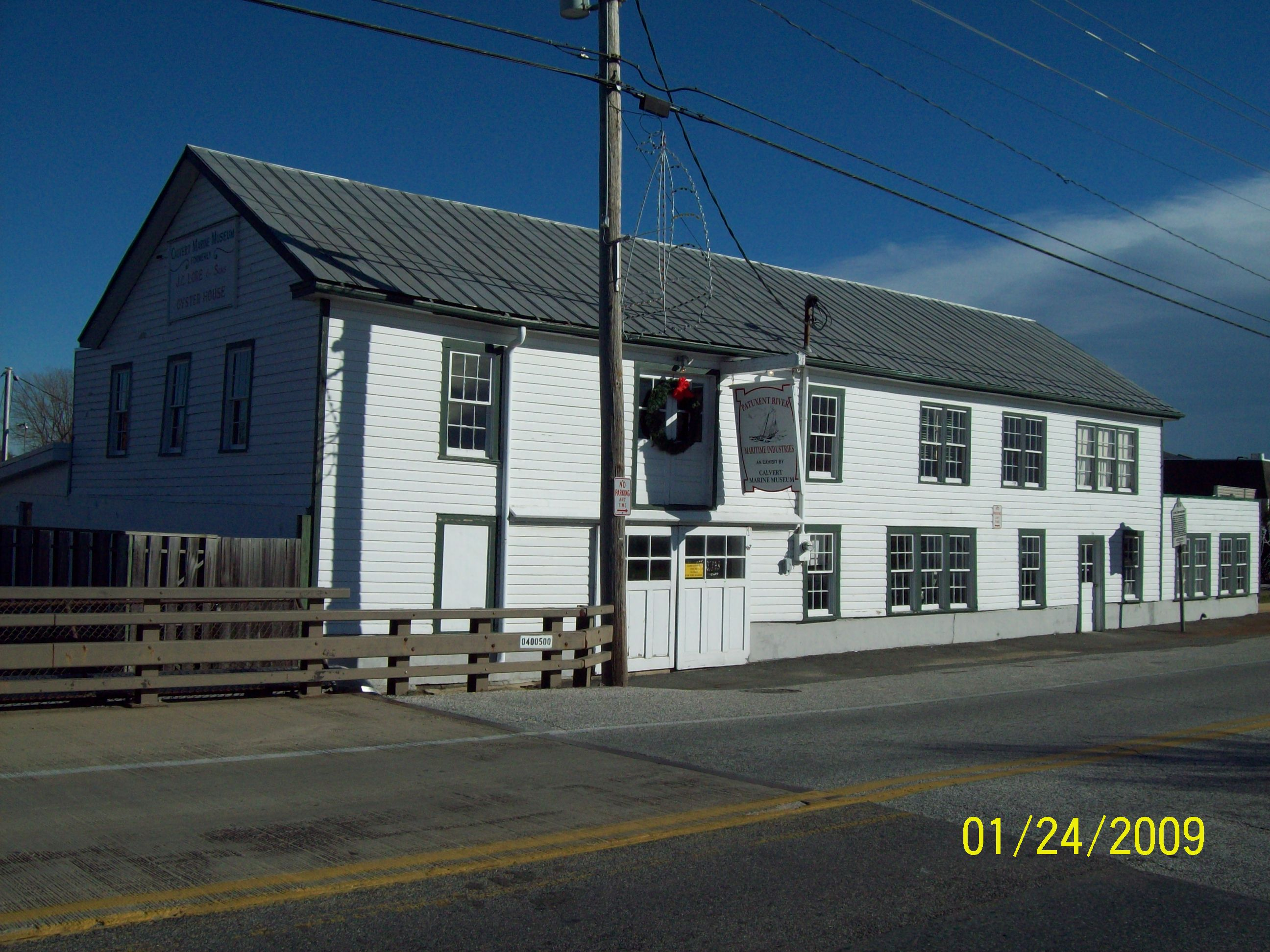
J.C. Lore Oyster House - North View, December 2008

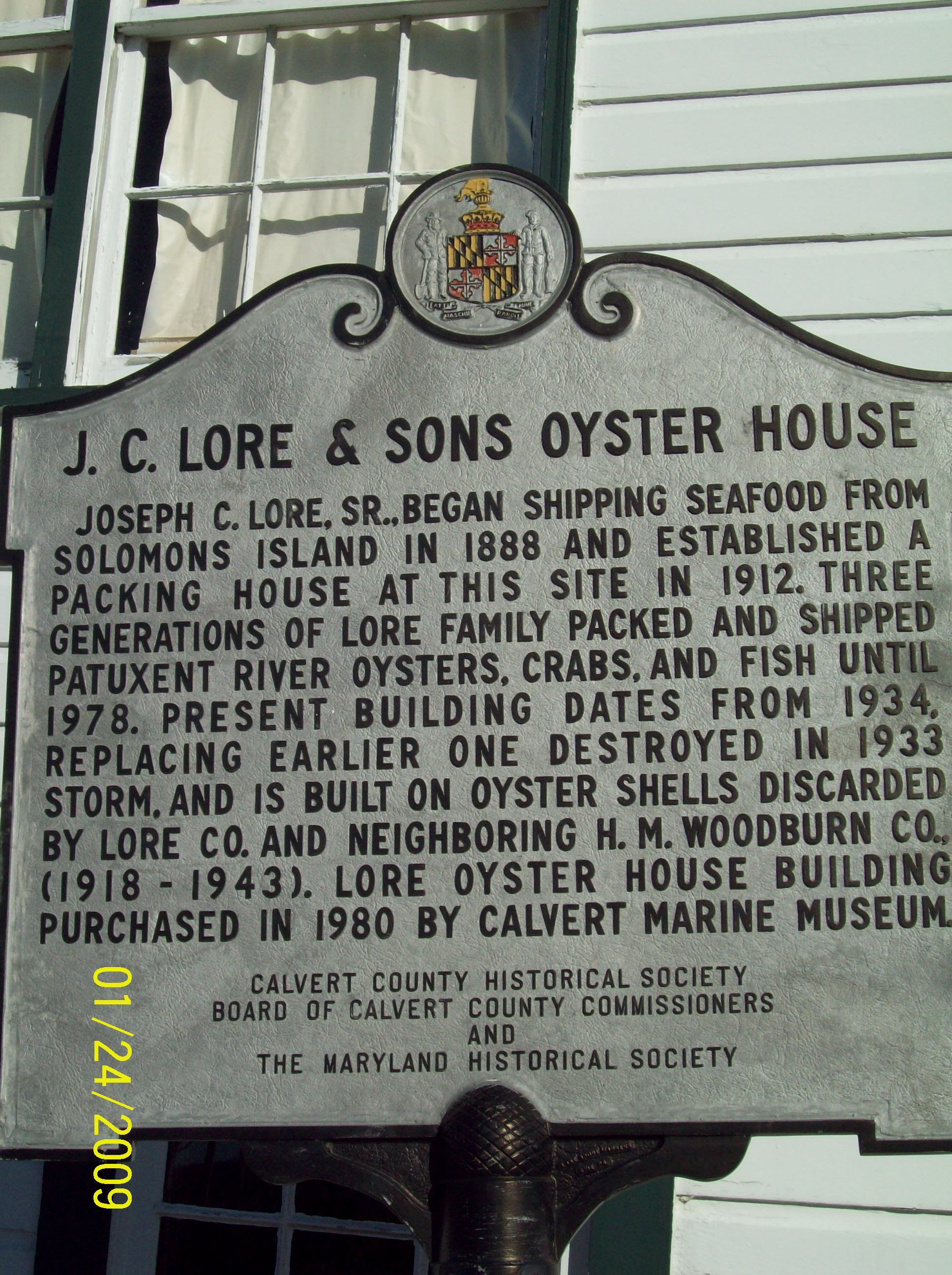
J.C. Lore Oyster House - Historic Marker, December 2008

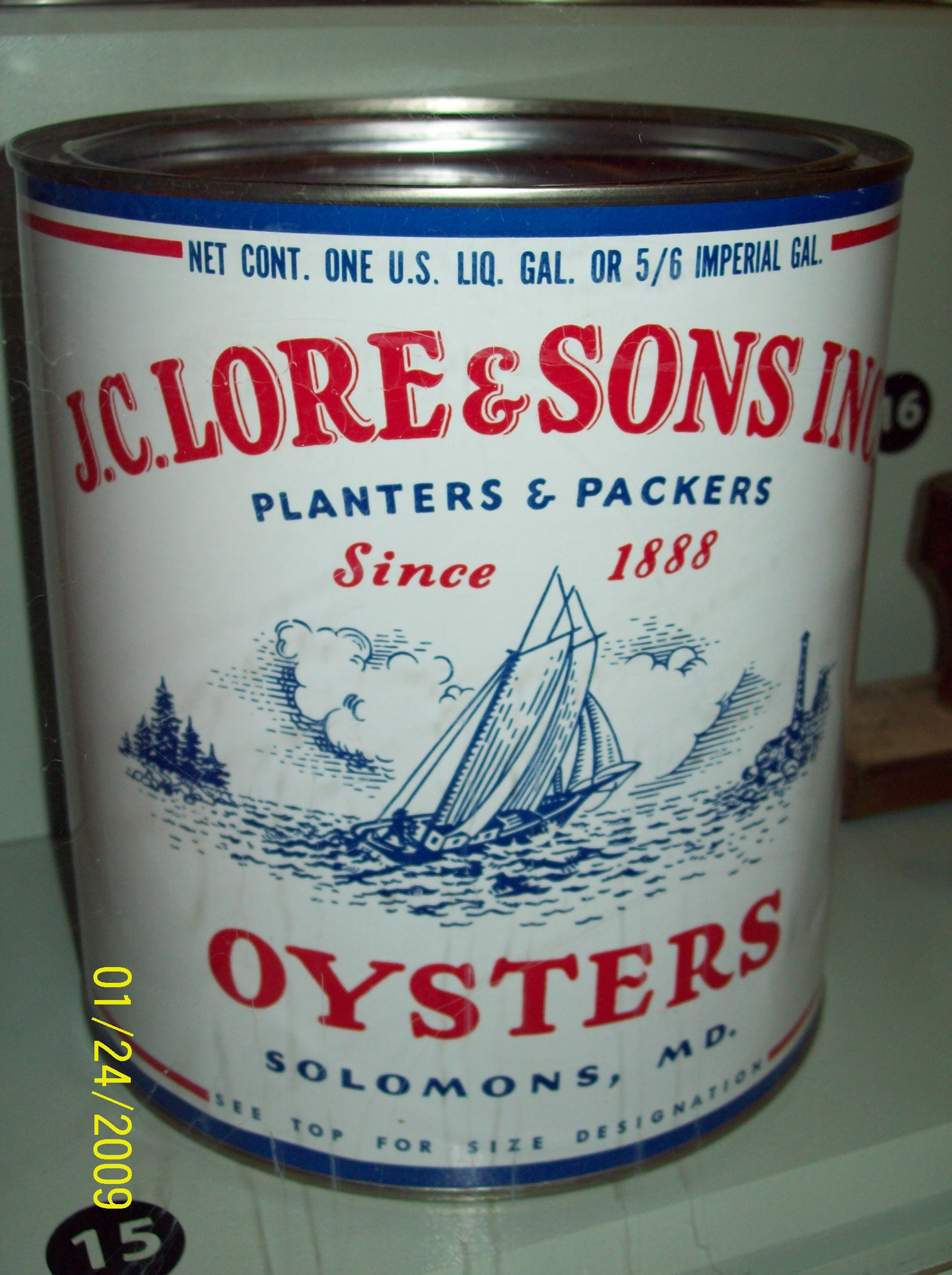
J.C. Lore Oyster House - Can, December 2008

== See also ==
- Rudolph Oyster House: A National Historic Landmark in New York
- List of National Historic Landmarks in Maryland
- National Register of Historic Places listings in Calvert County, Maryland
