= Modesty (sloop) =

Oyster-dredging sloop built in Long Island

Coordinates: 40°43′21.92″N 73°5′44.72″W

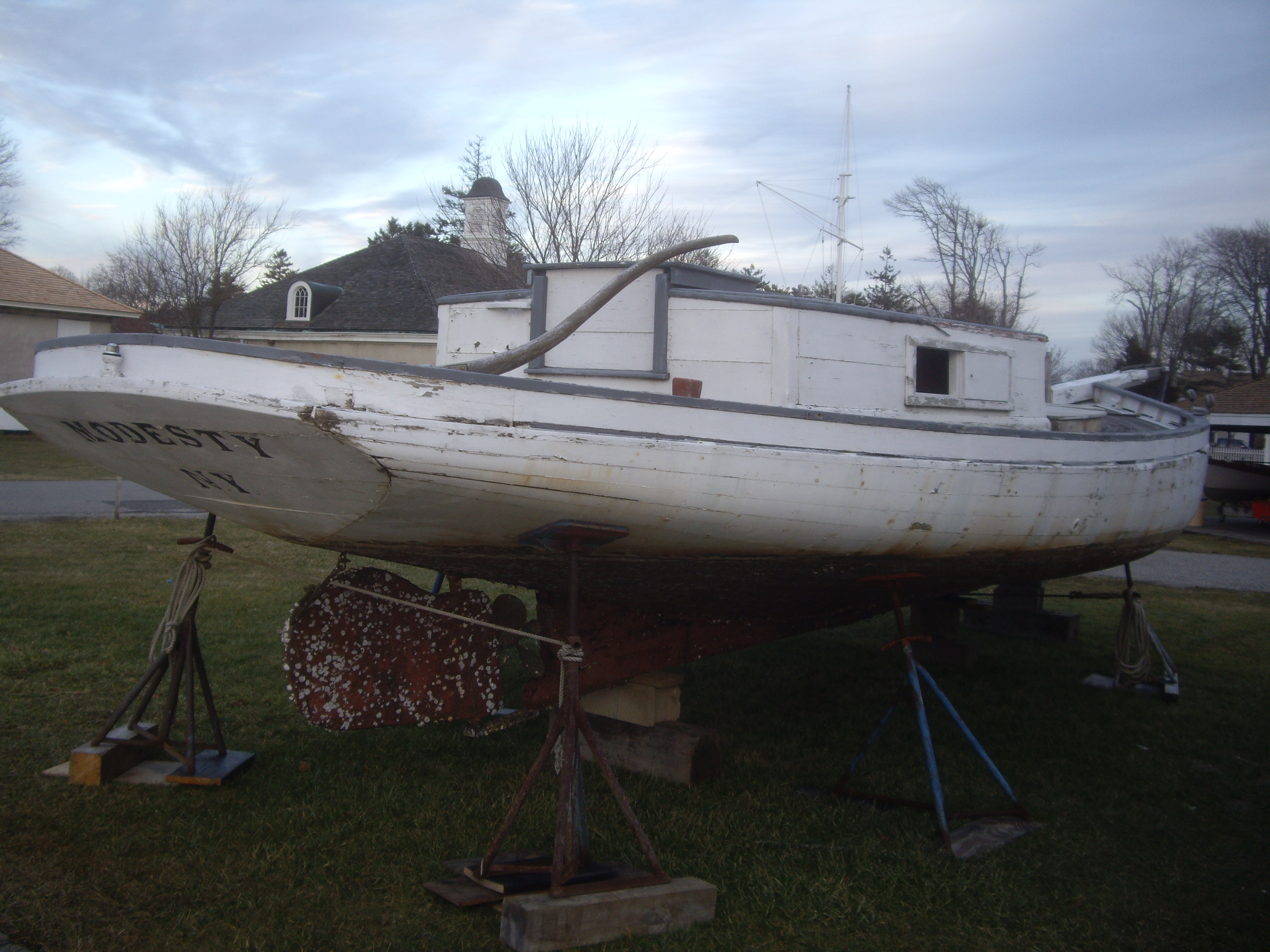
- Modesty on display at the Long Island Maritime Museum in January 2008

History

United States
- Name: Modesty; Halrose (1944-1948)
- Owner: Theodore Haupt (1923-1936); David Menegus (1936-1944); William H. Palmer (1944-1948); Dr. Carl Beam (1948-1970); Leo Pagan (1970-1974); Long Island Maritime Museum (1974-present)
- Builder: Wood & Chute Shipyard, Greenport, Suffolk County, New York
- Cost: $4,000
- Launched: July 1923
- Refit: Restored 1975-1980
- Status: Museum ship since 1974

General characteristics
- Type: Shellfish dredging sloop
- Length: 35 ft 9 in (10.90 m)
- Beam: 12 ft 2 in (3.71 m)
- Draft: 2 ft 8 in (0.81 m)
- Propulsion: 1 × 2-cycle 16 hp (12 kW) Gafka gasoline engine
- Sail plan: Gaff rig
- Modesty (south-sider sloop)
- U.S. National Register of Historic Places
- U.S. National Historic Landmark
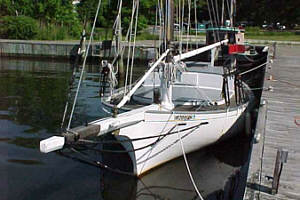
- Modesty in November 2009
- Location: West Sayville, New York
- NRHP reference No.: 01001051

Significant dates
- Added to NRHP: August 7, 2001
- Designated NHL: August 7, 2001

Modesty was an oyster sloop built in 1923 by The Wood and Chute Shipyard of Greenport, Long Island, and is now located at the Long Island Maritime Museum in West Sayville, New York.

Modeled after the catboat Honest, which was built in 1892 by Jelle Dykstra on the west bank of Greens Creek in West Sayville, Modesty was built as a gaff-rigged sloop, but retained the extreme beam of a catboat. For auxiliary power, a two-cylinder Gaffga gasoline engine was installed.

Modesty was described by oystermen as a true "southsider". She is believed to be the last sailing scallop dredger built on Long Island. A beautiful vessel, a fine sailer and typical of the old oyster sloops, her lines show graceful proportions in hull and rig. She has a wide beam and sits low in the water. Her shallow draft permitted her to operate commercially in the oyster and scallop flats of Long Island's bays and the river estuaries of Connecticut.

The fact that she was even built at the end of the age of sail is due to a law enacted before World War I, which stipulated that only sail power could be used while dredging for scallops. By this time, many boats in the fleet had their centerboards plugged. After working as a scallop dredger in the Peconic Bay until 1936, Modesty moved to Connecticut to finish her working career as an oyster dredger. From the 1948 until 1974 she served as a pleasure yacht for various owners.

When Modesty was acquired by the Long Island Maritime Museum, formerly the Suffolk Marine Museum, in 1976, Theodore Haupt, her first owner was present to receive her colors. After restoration, Modesty was relaunched in 1980 by the Museum. She was christened with a bottle of champagne mixed with water from the Great Peconic Bay and the Great South Bay. A new 1880 penny was placed under the mast along with several pre-1923 coins discovered when the mast was removed during her restoration. Modesty was designated a National Historic Landmark in 2001. Modesty is berthed next to the 1888 oyster dredging sloop Priscilla and near the 1908 Rudolph Oyster House, both of which are also National Historic Landmarks.
