= Priscilla (ship) =

Priscilla as the name of a ship may refer to:

- Priscilla (sloop), a classic oyster dredging sloop and U.S. National Historic Landmark berthed at the Long Island Maritime Museum at West Sayville, New York;
- Priscilla (SP-44), the proposed designation for an auxiliary schooner acquired by the United States Navy in 1917 but never commissioned.
