= Connetquot High School =

Location
- 190 Seventh Street; Bohemia, New York 11716–1331; United States; 40°47′00″N 73°08′19″W

Information
- Type: Public high school
- Motto: "Today We Follow, Tomorrow We Lead"
- Established: 1963
- School district: Connetquot Central School District
- Superintendent: Dr. Joseph Centamore
- Principal: Michael A. Moran
- Faculty: 153.54 (FTE)
- Grades: 9–12
- Enrollment: 1,755 (2023–2024)
- Student to teacher ratio: 11.43
- Campus: Suburban
- Colors: Red and White
- Mascot: T-Birds
- Website: School website

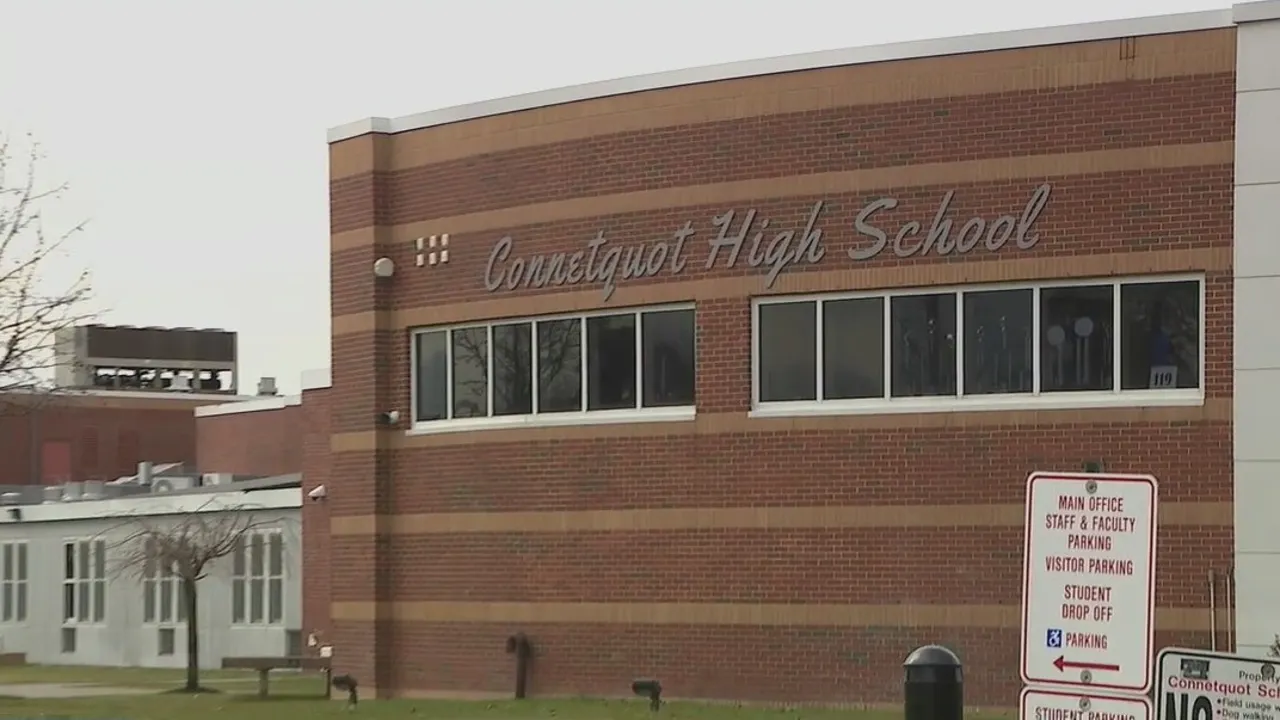
Connetquot High School viewed from the street entrance

Connetquot High School (CHS) is a public high school serving students from the 9th–12th grades, located in Bohemia, New York. It is part of the Connetquot Central School District.

Connetquot High School's school district, which only has a single comprehensive high school, includes the entirety of the communities of Oakdale and Ronkonkoma, and almost all of Bohemia, while it also serves parts of Islandia, Sayville, and West Sayville.

== Demographics ==
According to data from USN, Connetquot High School has a total enrollment of over 1,700 students, with 51% being male, and 49% female. 74.6% of students are white, 14.8% are Hispanic, 5.9% are Asian, 3.4% are black, and 1% are of mixed race.

== History ==
The school was established in 1963, three years after voters in the existing Oakdale-Bohemia and Ronkonkoma school districts voted to consolidate their two districts.

Suffolk Country Police investigated the school in February 2023, after the alleged discovery of homophobic graffiti in one of the school's hallways.

=== Failed shooting/bombing plans ===
Connetquot High School has been the target of multiple planned attacks. All of them, however, were discovered and prevented. The first was in 2007, when then student Christopher Franko planned to murder his fellow students as well as teachers in a plan reminiscent of Columbine. Franko planned to attack the school again in 2010, but was discovered and arrested. The final known planned attack was thwarted in 2019, when 3 students were discussing detonating explosives at the school on their school bus. Their conversation was overheard by another student, later leading to the three conspirators' arrest.

=== Principal departure and student protest ===
In March 2023, the Principal of Connetquot High School, Michael Moran, took a brief leave of absence from the school, although he did not make it clear why. It was generally believed, however, that the leave of absence was ordered by the District, and some Connetquot residents speculated this was the result of Moran's alleged support for the display of pride flags in the school. This prompted a significant number of students to not attend their classes, instead protesting by sitting along the lockers, holding up signs requesting the district reinstate Moran to his position, and chanting for the return of the principal. Moran returned to his position a month later, in April 2023, and the protests ceased. From that point he has remained Principal of Connetquot High School.

Connetquot students' protest captured by student cell phone

== Academics ==
According to Newsday data, 91.2% of Connetquot graduates earn a New York state regent's diploma (55.2% with advanced designation). Also, 55.6% of graduates plan to attend a 4-year college and 35.8% plan to attend a 2-year college.

== Athletics ==
The school competes in Section XI of the New York State Public High School Athletic Association.

Connetquot High School was the recipient of the highest possible award for a football team in Suffolk County, the Rugter's Trophy, in 1989.

=== Swimming & diving ===
During the 2022 - 2023 school year, Connetquot and East Islip's boys swimming & diving team beat out all other teams in their league, and won the coveted title of undefeated for their schools. Adding to this accomplishment, in the following school year, Connetquot and East Islip's girls swimming & diving team also went undefeated, with a final victory rate of 8–0.

From 2021 - 2024, 10 out of the 13 records for Connetquot and East Islip's boys swimming & diving team were broken by then Connetquot student Tristan Weingarten with most of his event times qualifying for New York state championships. Weingarten would then go on to make the All-Long Island boys swimming team in April 2024.

== Notable alumni ==
- John Bolaris- television meteorologist and real estate agent
- Sal Butera – MLB catcher
- Michael Carbonaro – magician, television personality
- Thomas Croci – former New York State Senator
- Stefanie DeLeo – author, playwright
- Moira Kelly – actress
- Jane Monheit – jazz and adult contemporary vocalist
- John Pacella – MLB pitcher drafted by New York Mets in 1974
- Timothy Treadwell – documentary filmmaker
- Alexis Weik – New York State Senator
- Pete D'Alessandro – former general manager of the Sacramento Kings
- Pete Correale – comedian
- Jane Monheit - Jazz singer
- Marc Dworkin - American writer and producer known for TV series including Hope & Faith and more recently The Thundermans
