= Hervey Garrett Smith =

American illustrator

- Born: January 17, 1896
- Died: November 12, 1979 (aged 83)
- Occupation: Illustrator
- Notable work: The Marlinspike Sailor

Hervey Garrett Smith (17 January 1896 – 12 November 1979) was an American maritime illustrator and the author of the classic work of traditional seamanship, The Marlinspike Sailor.

== Biography ==
Smith was born and raised in Bayport, New York. A graduate of the Pratt Institute and a lifelong sailor, he worked as a maritime illustrator and writer. Smith drew and painted for a variety of sailing and boating magazines and made contributions to National Geographic Magazine, including a painting of the full-size replica ship, Mayflower II.

In the early 1930s, so that young people were eligible to compete in local races, Smith served as the founding commodore of the inclusive and inexpensive yacht club, Wet Pants Sailing Association.

In the late 1960s, after Suffolk County acquired Meadowedge, the former estate of Florence Bourne, Smith worked with the local community to transform a portion of the waterfront property into a home for preserving the region’s maritime history, and, in 1968, he was named as the founding director of the Suffolk Marine Museum, now known as the Long Island Maritime Museum.

He died in Naugatuck, Connecticut. He is buried in St. Ann's Cemetery in Sayville, New York.

== Bibliography ==
- 1949: The Marlinspike Sailor. New York: Rudder Publishing Company.
  - Republished with additional material: Tuckahoe, New York: J. De Graff, 1971. Republished: New York: Dover Publications, 1990.
- 1953: The Arts of the Sailor: Knotting, Splicing and Ropework. New York: D. Van Nostrand Company.
- 1955: Boat Carpentry: Repairs, Alterations, Construction. New York: D. Van Nostrand Company.
- 1964: The Small-Boat Sailor's Bible. Garden City, New York: Doubleday.
- 1972: The Racing Sailor's Bible. Garden City, New York: Doubleday.
