= Sayville High School =

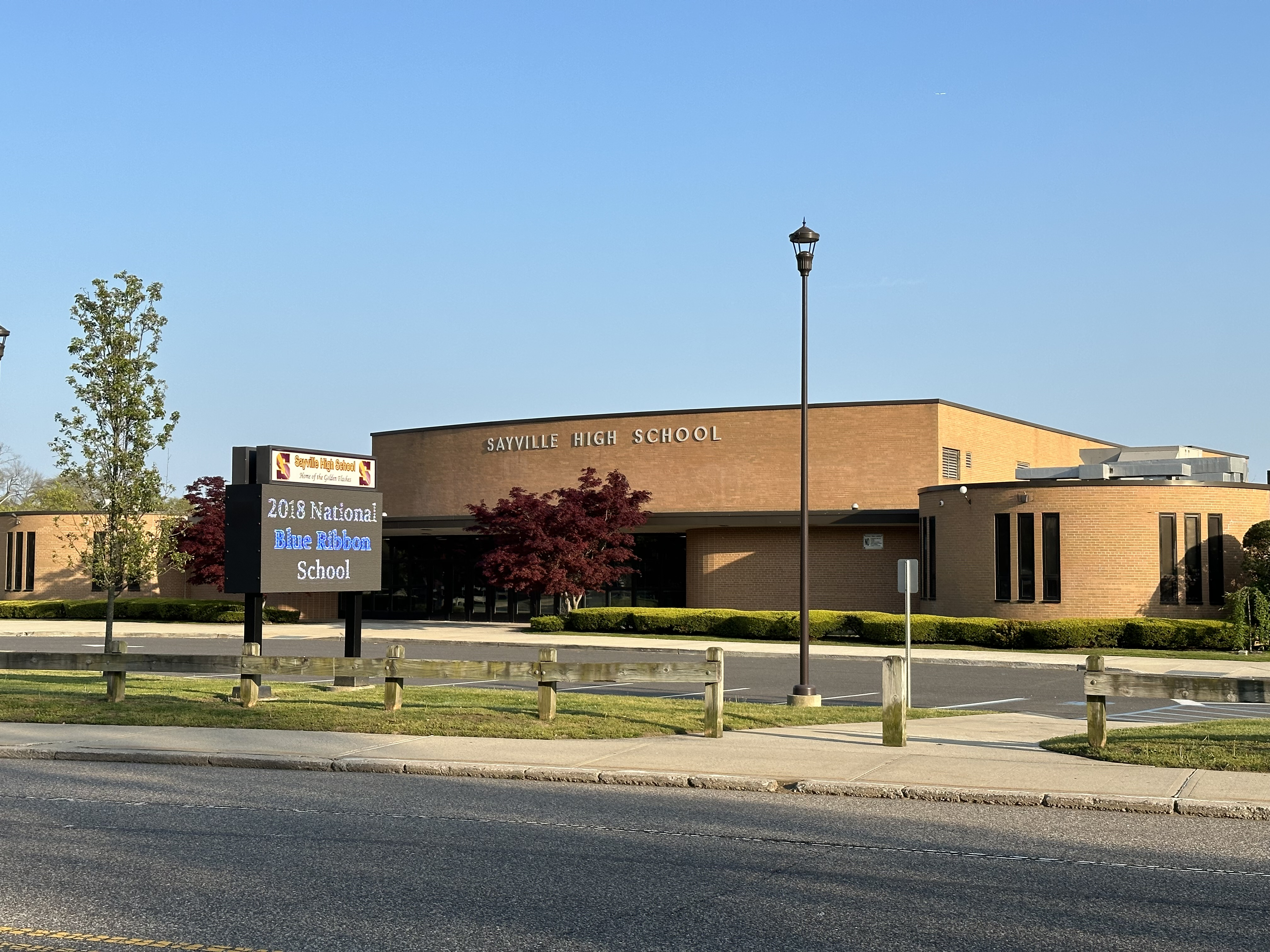

Location
- 20 Brook Street West Sayville, New York; United States; 40.73537°N 73.09414°W

Information
- Type: Public secondary
- Motto: None
- School district: Sayville School District
- Principal: Stephanie Bricker
- Staff: 81.99 (on an FTE basis)
- Grades: 9–12
- Enrollment: 850 (2023–2024)
- Student to teacher ratio: 10.49
- Colors: Purple and Gold
- Mascot: Golden Flash
- Newspaper: The Current
- Website: https://shs.sayvilleschools.org/

Sayville High School is a public high school located in West Sayville, New York on Long Island. The school is part of Sayville School District.

The school was nominated as a National Blue Ribbon School in 2018 for its graduation rate of 98% and 100+ curricular opportunities.

== Enrollment ==
Data from Niche states that 914 students attend Sayville High School. Half of all students are male and the other half female. The school has a white majority, at 86.9%. Another 8% of students are Hispanic, 2.2% are Asian, and 2.3% are mixed. African Americans are the school's smallest minority group, making up just 0.7% of the school's students.

== History ==
Sayville football won the 2022 Long Island Championship and the Rutgers Cup, making it the team's fifth time in doing so.

The girls' Varsity Cross Country team won the NYSPHAA Championships in 2022 under Coach Tom Duffy.

Sayville football lost in the 2023 Long Island Semifinals to East Islip High School after an injury was sustained to junior QB Jake Triptree, which led to backup sophomore QB Patrick Coan playing in the semifinals.

In October of that same year, it was reported that the boy's varsity soccer season was canceled due to multiple incidents of hazing, bullying, and violence towards younger members of the team, with racism and antisemitism being reported in previous seasons. This response was praised by many anti-bullying advocates, while there haven't been arguments from locals about the cancelation.

In November 2023, the girls' Cross Country team won the NYSPHAA for the second year in a row.

In June 2024, the girls' lacrosse team won the NYSPHAA Girls' Lacrosse Championship semifinals 13–8 against Our Lady of Mercy.

In November 2025, the boys' varsity golf team won the Suffolk County championships 8-1 against Sachem.

== Academics ==
According to USN data, the school has a graduation rate of 99%, and 56% of students took at least one AP exam in 2024.

== Athletics ==
The school competes in Section XI of the New York State Public High School Athletic Association.

== Notable alumni ==
- Andrew Garbarino, politician
- Chris Reccardi, animator
- Jack Coan, CFL quarterback (Saskatchewan Roughriders)
- Melissa Joan Hart, actress
- Bill Thieben, Former NBA center (Detroit Pistons)
