= Michael Behonick =

American soccer player (born 1981)

Personal information
- Full name: Michael Behonick
- Date of birth: January 3, 1981 (age 45)
- Place of birth: Bohemia, New York, U.S.
- Height: 6 ft 2 in (1.88 m)
- Position: Goalkeeper

Youth career
- 1999–2002: American Eagles

Senior career*
Years	Team	Apps	(Gls)
2003–2005	Charleston Battery	58	(0)
2004	→ Harrisburg City Islanders (loan)	11	(0)
2006	New York Red Bulls	0	(0)
2006	→ Long Island Rough Riders (loan)	2	(0)
2007	Crystal Palace Baltimore	1	(0)
2007–2009	Puerto Rico Islanders	10	(0)
2009	→ Bayamon FC (loan)	1	(0)
- * Club domestic league appearances and goals as of 25 February 2010

Michael Behonick (born January 3, 1981, in Bohemia, New York) is an American retired soccer player who last played for the Puerto Rico Islanders of the USL First Division. Behonick is now an assistant coach at for the Pittsburgh Panthers men's soccer team.

== Career ==
=== College ===
Behonick played college soccer at American University from 1999 to 2002, where he helped the Eagles reach the NCAA Tournament as a junior and earned second-team all-Patriot League honors the same season.

=== Professional ===
Behonick was selected 51st overall in the 2003 MLS SuperDraft by D.C. United but did not remain with the club. Instead, he began his professional career with the Charleston Battery of the A-League but did not see significant playing time until starting 10 matches in the 2005 season.

In 2004, the Battery sent him on loan to the Harrisburg City Islanders where he played seven games. In 2006, he was signed by New York Red Bulls as the team's third-choice goalkeeper behind Tony Meola and Jon Conway. The Red Bulls sent him on loan to the Long Island Rough Riders before releasing him at the end of the season. In 2007, he joined Crystal Palace Baltimore after passing their trial in early 2007. He began the season as first choice goalkeeper, but after some heavy defeats found himself dropped in favor of Brian Rowland.

Half way through the season he was signed by the Islanders to serve as second string goalie behind Josh Saunders. In January 2008 he suffered an injury to his leg when in camp with the Puerto Rico national team, sidelining him for five months and ruining his chance of becoming first goalkeeper for the Puerto Rico Islanders after Josh Saunders left. In July 2008 he rejoined the Puerto Rico Islanders as backup to Bill Gaudette.

== Honors ==
=== Club ===
==== Puerto Rico Islanders ====
- USL First Division Championship
  - Runners-up (1): 2008
- Commissioner's Cup
  - Winners (1): 2008
- CFU Club Championship
  - Runner-up (1): 2009
