= Rudolph Oyster House =

Building in West Sayville, New York

- U.S. National Register of Historic Places
- U.S. National Historic Landmark
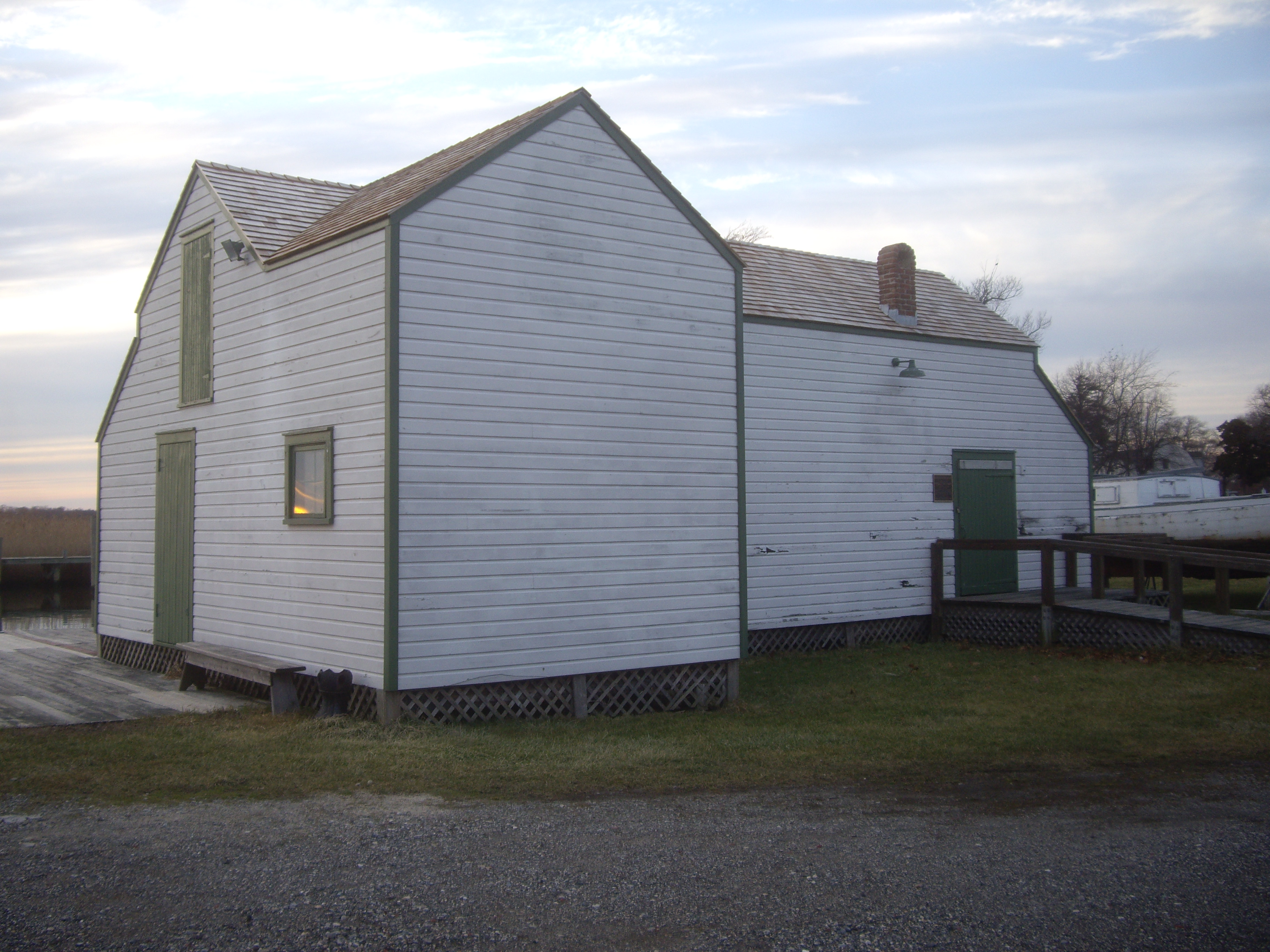

- Location within New York Location within the United States
- Location: 84 West Ave., West Sayville, NY
- Coordinates: 40.722775°N 73.095286°W
- Area: less than one acre
- Built: 1908
- Architectural style: marine industrial
- NRHP reference No.: 01001052

Significant dates
- Added to NRHP: August 7, 2001
- Designated NHL: August 7, 2001

The William Rudolph Oyster House is a historic seafood processing building on the grounds of the Long Island Maritime Museum in West Sayville, New York. Built in 1908, it is a rare well-preserved example of a typical oyster culling house of the early 20th century, of which many once lined the local waterfront. The building was designated a National Historic Landmark in 2001.

== Description and history ==
The Rudolph Oyster House stands on the waterfront grounds of the Long Island Maritime Museum. It is a single-story wood-frame structure, mounted on wooden pilings and measuring 44.5 by 16.5 feet (13.6 m × 5.0 m). Its exterior is finished with wooden clapboards, and it has a gabled roof. The western roof face has a lower roof section that is set at an offset below the upper section, which is finished with glass skylighting to provide natural light to the shucking area. The interior retains original fixtures and features to facilitate the sorting, shucking, and packing of oysters.

The Rudolph Oyster House is a typical cullhouse, built in 1908 by William Rudolph, the son of Dutch immigrants. It was originally located on the waterfront off Shore Road, and was moved to its present site (about 600 feet (180 m) from that site) when the museum acquired the building. Rudolph started his company in 1895, having grown up working in the oyster beds of Great South Bay. Rudolph and then his sons operated the business until 1947. The building was acquired by the museum in 1974.

== See also ==
- J. C. Lore Oyster House: A National Historic Landmark oyster house in Maryland
- List of National Historic Landmarks in New York
- National Register of Historic Places listings in Suffolk County, New York
