= Long Island Maritime Museum =

Museum in West Sayville, New York, United States

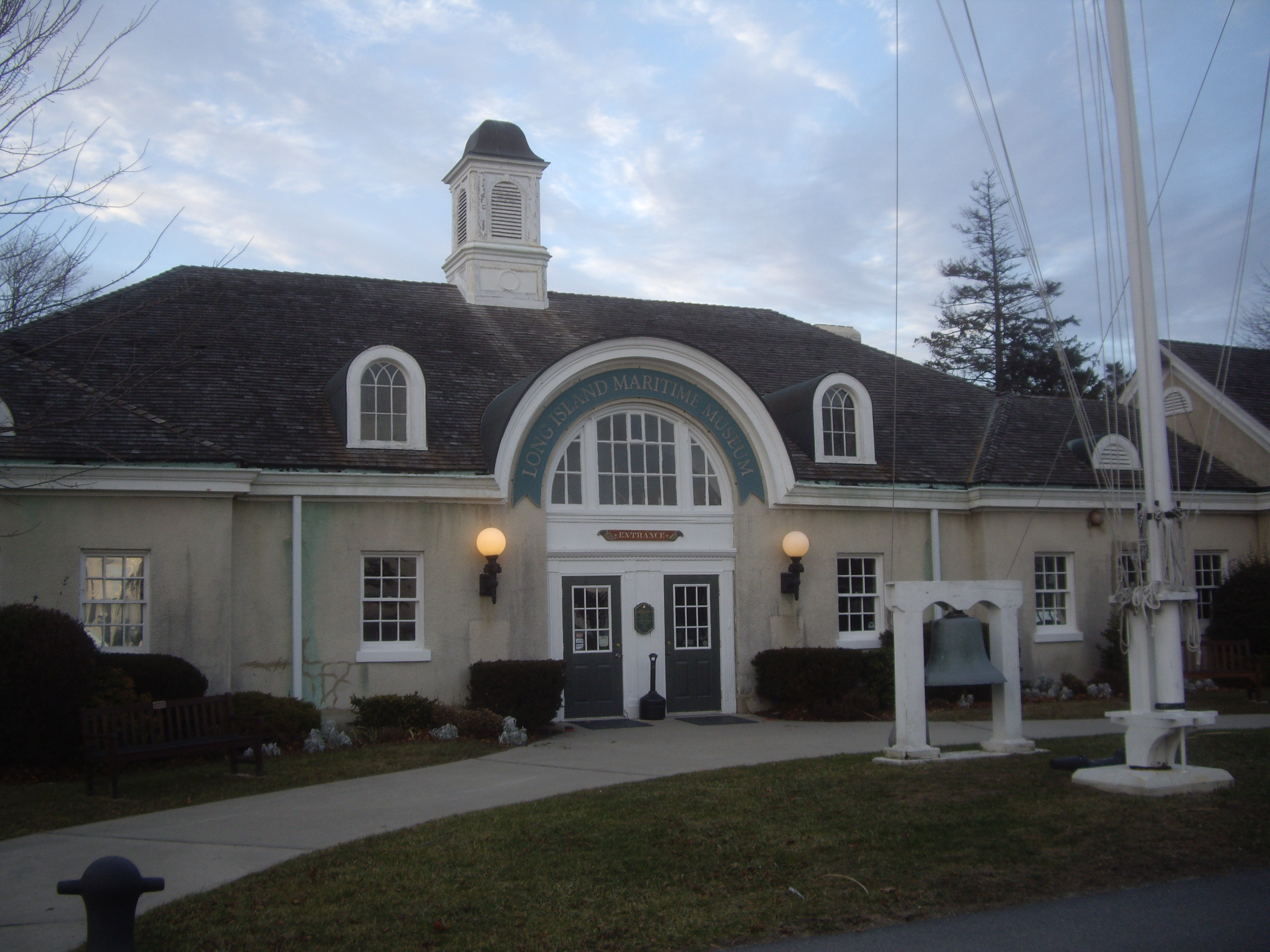
- Established: 1966
- Location: 88 West Avenue, West Sayville, New York, United States
- Coordinates: 40.722775°N 73.095286°W
- Director: Terry Lister-Blitman
- Website: http://www.limaritime.org

The Long Island Maritime Museum is located in West Sayville, New York.

== History ==
The Long Island Maritime Museum was founded in 1966 on the waterfront grounds of the former Meadowedge estate of Mrs. Florence Bourne Hard in West Sayville. Florence Hard was the daughter of Frederick Gilbert Bourne, president of Singer Sewing Machine from 1889 to 1905. Charged with the mission of preserving Long Island's maritime history and heritage for educational purposes, the museum has been welcoming visitors from all over the world for over 50 years. Today the mansion is used as the headquarters of the West Sayville Golf Course and Country Club, as well as a restaurant aimed at catering to weddings.

The museum's Main Exhibit and Administrative Building, formerly the estate's garage, houses a collection of local half models, a permanent exhibit on Long Island shipwrecks and the United States Lifesaving Service, and a gallery for annual exhibits. Hervey Garrett Smith is credited to being the museum's founder and first director. The museum grounds and buildings were originally owned by the Bourne-Hard family.

The garage also houses the Elward Smith III Library, a treasure trove of books, documents, photographs and boat plans. The Library is located in the east wing of the Carriage House, with the archives upstairs. The Library, which also houses many unique models and trophies is used for educational programs and meetings.

== Vessels ==
The Long Island Maritime Museum is the current home of Priscilla and Modesty, two vessels which are National Historic Landmarks. Other vessels include "Pauline," "Kid," and "Lorelei."

The Long Island Maritime Museum acquired Priscilla in 1976. The vessel was significantly altered throughout her extensive career. Until 2002, she served the Long Island Maritime Museum as a floating ambassador to other organizations on Long Island and in New York City. Priscilla like all working vessels was subject to heavy wear and deterioration, and was constantly undergoing maintenance and repair throughout her lifespan.

Because of her deteriorated condition, Priscilla underwent an extensive restoration at the Long Island Maritime Museum during a 19-month period between 2002 and 2003. The vessel has retained her historical physical appearance and the workmanship of Elisha Saxton and the care of her subsequent owners are testimony to her survival today. At the Long Island Maritime Museum, Priscilla is used as a floating exhibit next to the 1908 Rudolph Oyster House and berthed along the same dock as the 1923 scallop dredger Modesty.

Restored 1888 Oyster Sloop Priscilla, Floating Ambassador of the Long Island Maritime Museum, sets sail for a series of summer events. The vessel is scheduled to begin taking passengers out on the Great South Bay the first week of May, 2010.

Priscilla has been featured in a variety of special regattas throughout her history, including the Parade of Tall Ships at the "Salute to the Statue of Liberty" Fourth of July Celebration in 1986.

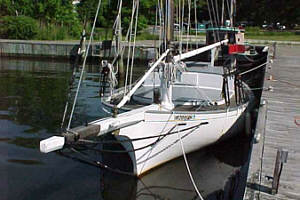
Modesty

The oyster sloop Modesty was built in 1923 by the Wood and Chute Shipyard of Greenport, Long Island. The vessel was originally built to dredge oysters and scallops under sail in the Peconic Bay. Modesty is believed to be the last large sailing shellfish dredger built anywhere along the shores of Long Island. Modesty was modeled after the 1892 catboat Honest, which was built by Jelle Dykstra of Greens Creek, West Sayville. Modesty was built as a gaff-rigged sloop but a two-cylinder Gafka gasoline engine was installed during the construction. The fact that Modesty was even built at the end of the age of sail is due to an old law enacted before World War I which stipulated that only sail power could be used while dredging for shellfish. After working as a scallop dredger in Peconic Bay until 1936, Modesty moved to Connecticut to finish her working career as an oyster dredger. From the 1950s until 1974 she served as a pleasure yacht for various owners.

== Historic landmarks and exhibits ==
The museum also includes the Rudolph Oyster House, a commercial oyster culling building that is a National Historic Landmark.

The museum is host to other historic exhibits as well. The Frank F. Penney Boatshop, which was at one time the laundry building of the Brooklyn Hotel in Center Moriches. The Bayman's Cottage(Beebe) was built in around the 1890s and moved from its original location at 45 West Avenue to the museum grounds. The Everitt-Lawrence Small Craft Exhibition Building hosts a variety of small crafts by some of Long Island's most important designer/builders; G.F. Carter, Wilbur Ketcham, Frank Conklin and Gil Smith.

== See also ==
- List of maritime museums in the United States
- List of museum ships
