= Sayville School District =

School district in the U.S. state of New York

Location
- Sayville, Suffolk County, New York; United States

District information
- Type: Public School District
- Motto: Caring and Learning
- Grades: K-12
- President: Christine Sarni
- Superintendent: Dr. Marc Ferris
- Schools: 5

Students and staff
- Students: 2,502
- District mascot: Golden Flashes
- Colors: Purple and Gold

Other information
- District Offices: 99 Greeley Avenue Sayville, NY 11782
- Website: www.sayvilleschools.org

Sayville School District (also referred to as Sayville Public Schools or Sayville Union Free School District) is a public school district encompassing the hamlet of Sayville, a large part of West Sayville, and a small part of Bayport on the South Shore of Long Island in the Town of Islip, Suffolk County, New York, United States.

== Enrollment ==
The total enrollment for the 2007–2008 school year was 3,434 students. A high percentage of graduates go on to higher education each year, to prestigious universities such as Princeton, Cornell, Brown, Columbia, Yale, Duke, Harvard, MIT, and R.P.I.

== History ==
In 1888, a notable wooden public school building was constructed on Greene Avenue, which was used by the school system until about 1958. Adelphi University also used the building for a period of time in the early 1960s. In 1964, the building was renovated for school administration use. "Old 88" burned down in a fire in December 1969, and a marker was placed in its memory in 2000.

In 1998, the district was the first on Long Island to approve breathalyzer testing of students.

All of the district's schools were temporarily closed on March 16, 2020, and the following months, due to the outbreak of COVID-19.

== Schools ==
- Sayville High School, Principal-Ronald Hoffer
- Sayville Middle School Principal-Joseph Castoro
- Cherry Avenue Elementary School Principal- Dr. Lisa Ihne
- Lincoln Avenue Elementary School Principal- Mr. Dominic Armano
- Sunrise Drive Elementary School Principal- Dr. James Foy
