= Priscilla (sloop) =

Coordinates: 40.722775°N 73.095286°W

- Priscilla (Long Island Sound Oyster Sloop)
- U.S. National Register of Historic Places
- U.S. National Historic Landmark
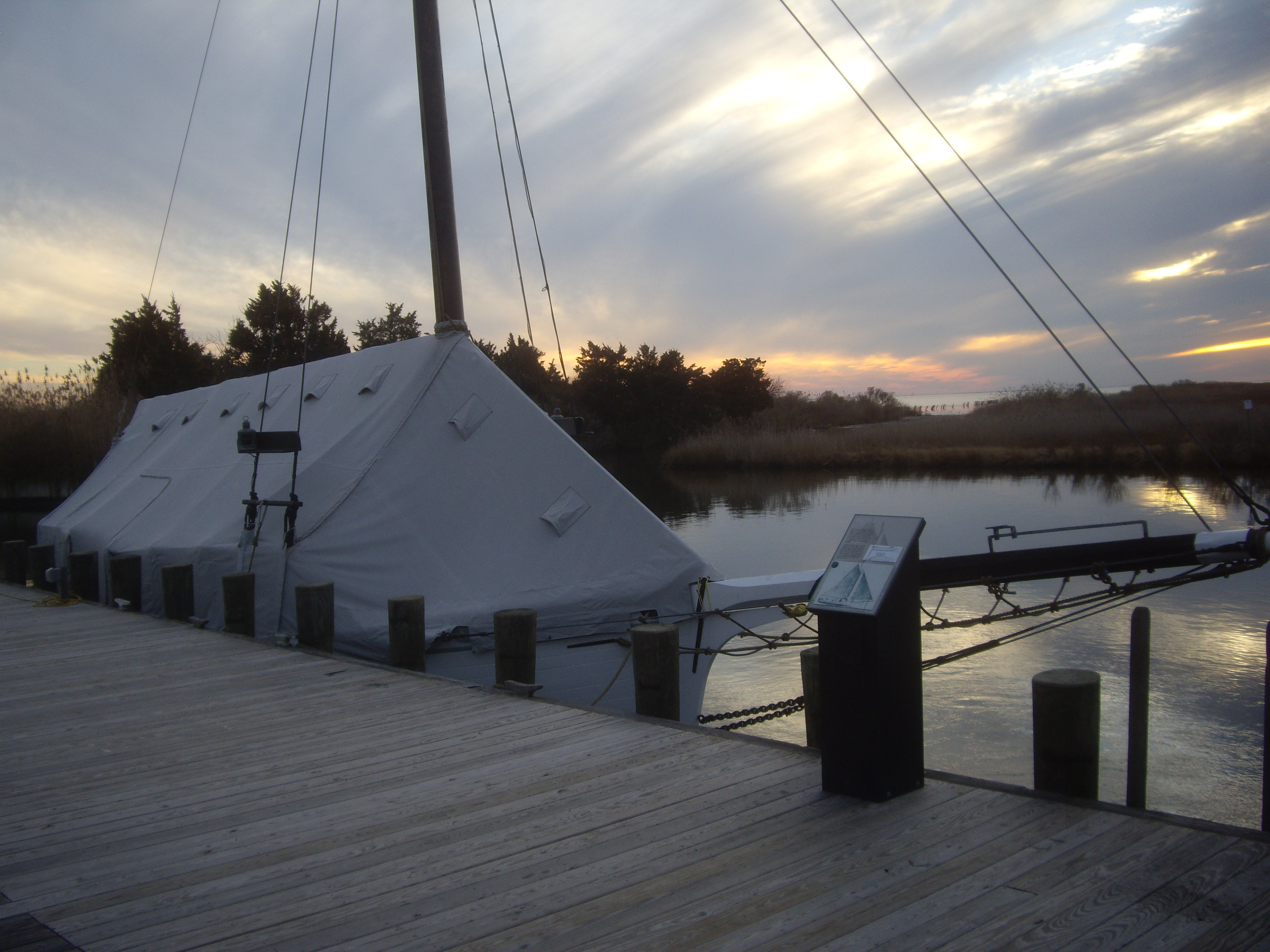
- Priscilla at the dock.
- Location: West Sayville, New York
- Built: 1888
- NRHP reference No.: 06000238

Significant dates
- Added to NRHP: February 17, 2006
- Designated NHL: February 17, 2006

Priscilla is a classic oyster dredging sloop and museum ship at the Long Island Maritime Museum. Built in 1888, it is the oldest surviving boat from the Great South Bay oyster fleet, and was designated a National Historic Landmark in 2006. It is berthed near the Modesty, another National Historic Landmark sloop.

== History ==
On Saturday, April 7, 1888, Elisha Saxton launched his brand new working sloop, Priscilla on the Patchogue River. Saxton had built Priscilla for George Rhinehart of Lawrence, New York, who named the boat for his wife, Priscilla.

From 1888 to 1963, Priscilla was owned and operated by several oystermen from Connecticut and New York. During these years, she experienced many changes. The oystermen spoke of "Pris" as a fast, able and "smart" boat - a "money maker" because, unlike other boats, she could dredge well in both light and heavy winds.

By 1963, the oyster beds were completely exhausted or covered with silt from storms and hurricanes of the previous decades. Priscilla is one of the last of the New York oyster sloops. From 1963 to 1976, Priscilla became a cruising sailboat after much hull and interior restoration.

Her owner, John Woodside, sailed Priscilla several times to the Bahamas and to Maine. In the early 1970s, he schooner-rigged her, copying the sail plan of the famous schooner America.

In 1976, John Woodside donated her to the Suffolk Marine Museum, which is known today as The Long Island Maritime Museum. As the largest vessel in the museum's collection, Priscilla has traveled the Great South Bay visiting various ports of call, and has participated in special regattas held for classic vessels. In 1986, she participated in the Parade of Tall Ships at the Salute to the Statue of Liberty Fourth of July Celebration in New York Harbor, receiving featured television coverage by WABC-TV.
