= Joseph Wood House =

Historic house in New York, United States

- U.S. National Register of Historic Places
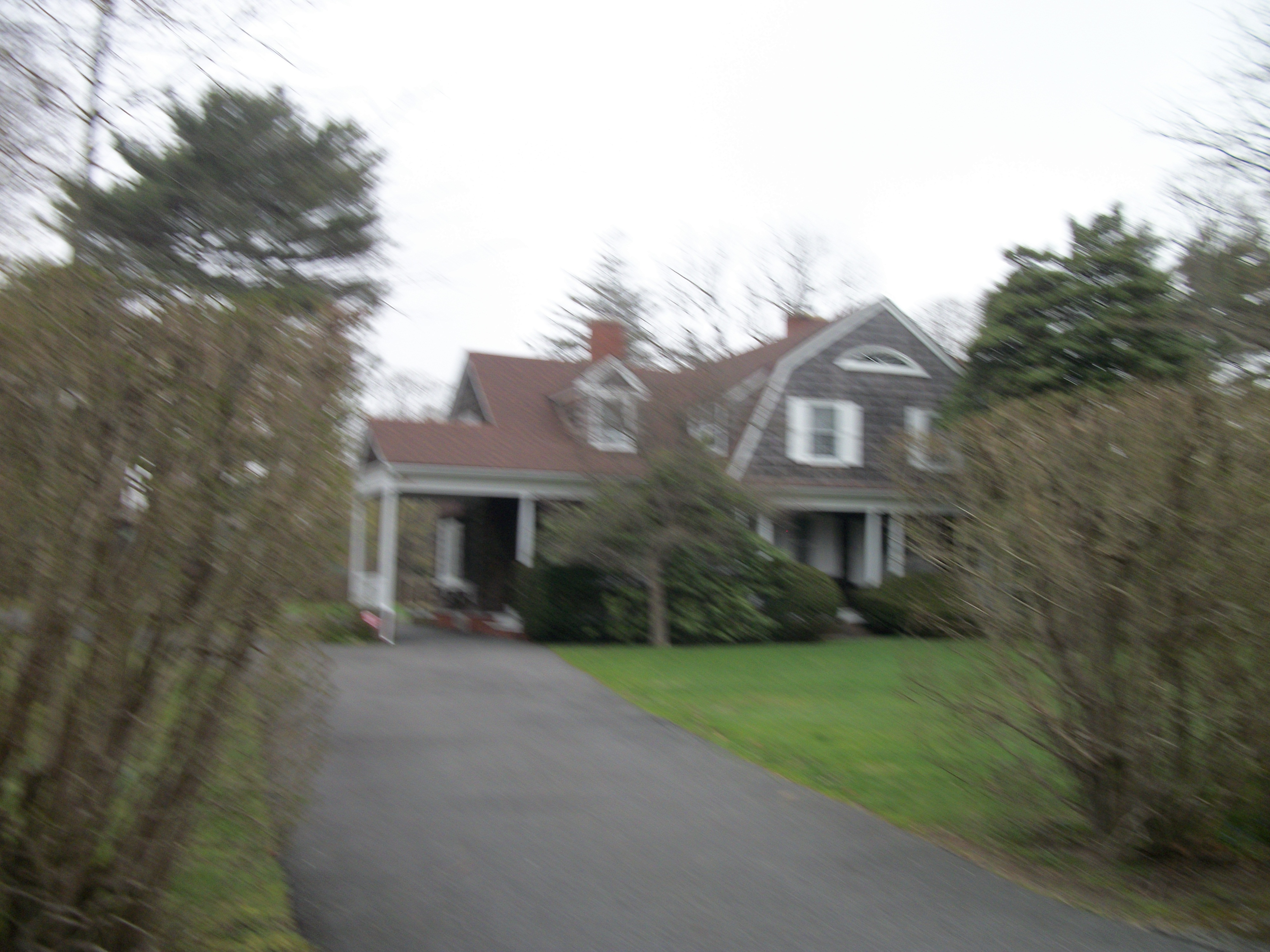
- Blurry shot of the Joseph Wood House in Sayville, New York

- Location within New York Location within the United States
- Location: 284 Greene Ave., Sayville, New York
- Coordinates: 40°44′9″N 73°4′33″W
- Area: 1.2 acres (0.49 ha)
- Built: 1892
- Architect: Green Isaac H., Jr.; Nunn, Robert
- Architectural style: Shingle Style
- NRHP reference No.: 03000406
- Added to NRHP: May 18, 2003

Joseph Wood House is a historic home located at Sayville in Suffolk County, New York. It was built in 1889 and is a 2-story, wood-framed Shingle Style dwelling of complex massing. It has a gambrel-roofed main block with 1 1/2-story wings. It features a continuous porch with attenuated Doric order columns and a porte cochere.

It was added to the National Register of Historic Places in 2003.
