= Jacob Ockers House =

Historic house in New York, United States

- U.S. National Register of Historic Places
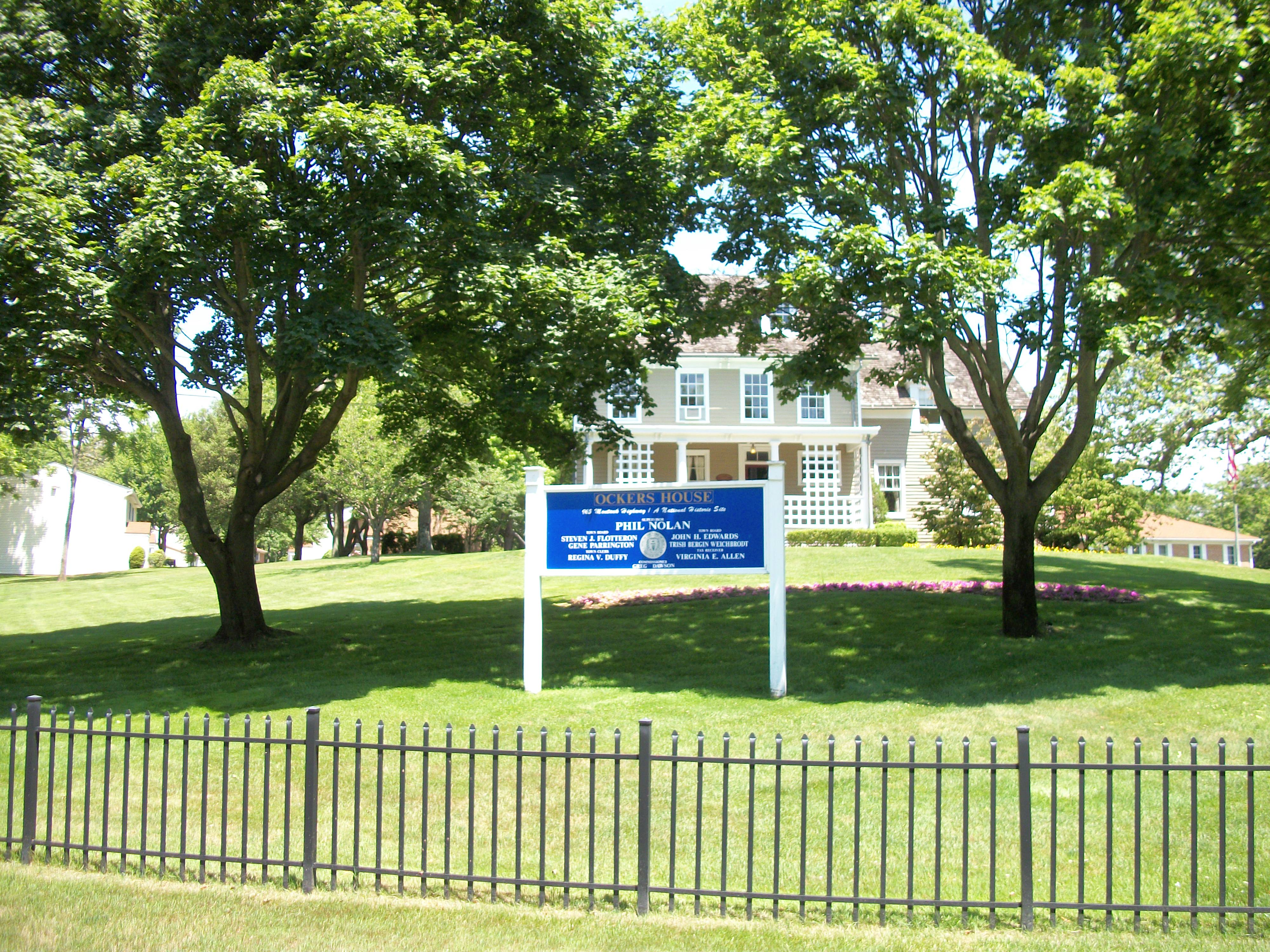

- Location within New York Location within the United States
- Location: 965 Montauk Hwy., Oakdale, New York
- Coordinates: 40°44′21″N 73°7′23″W
- Area: 0.3 acres (0.12 ha)
- Built: 1880
- Architectural style: Colonial Revival
- NRHP reference No.: 92000838
- Added to NRHP: July 10, 1992

Jacob Ockers House is a historic home located at Oakdale in Suffolk County, New York. It was built in 1880 and is a 2 1/2-story, four- by two-bay, frame dwelling with single story wings extending from the east and north elevations. It is sheathed in clapboard and rests on a brick foundation. It features a verandah with Doric order columns supporting the cornice.

The house was owned by Jacob Ockers who organized the Bluepoint Oyster Company. It was added to the National Register of Historic Places in 1992.
