= Bohemia, New York =

- Hamlet and census-designated place
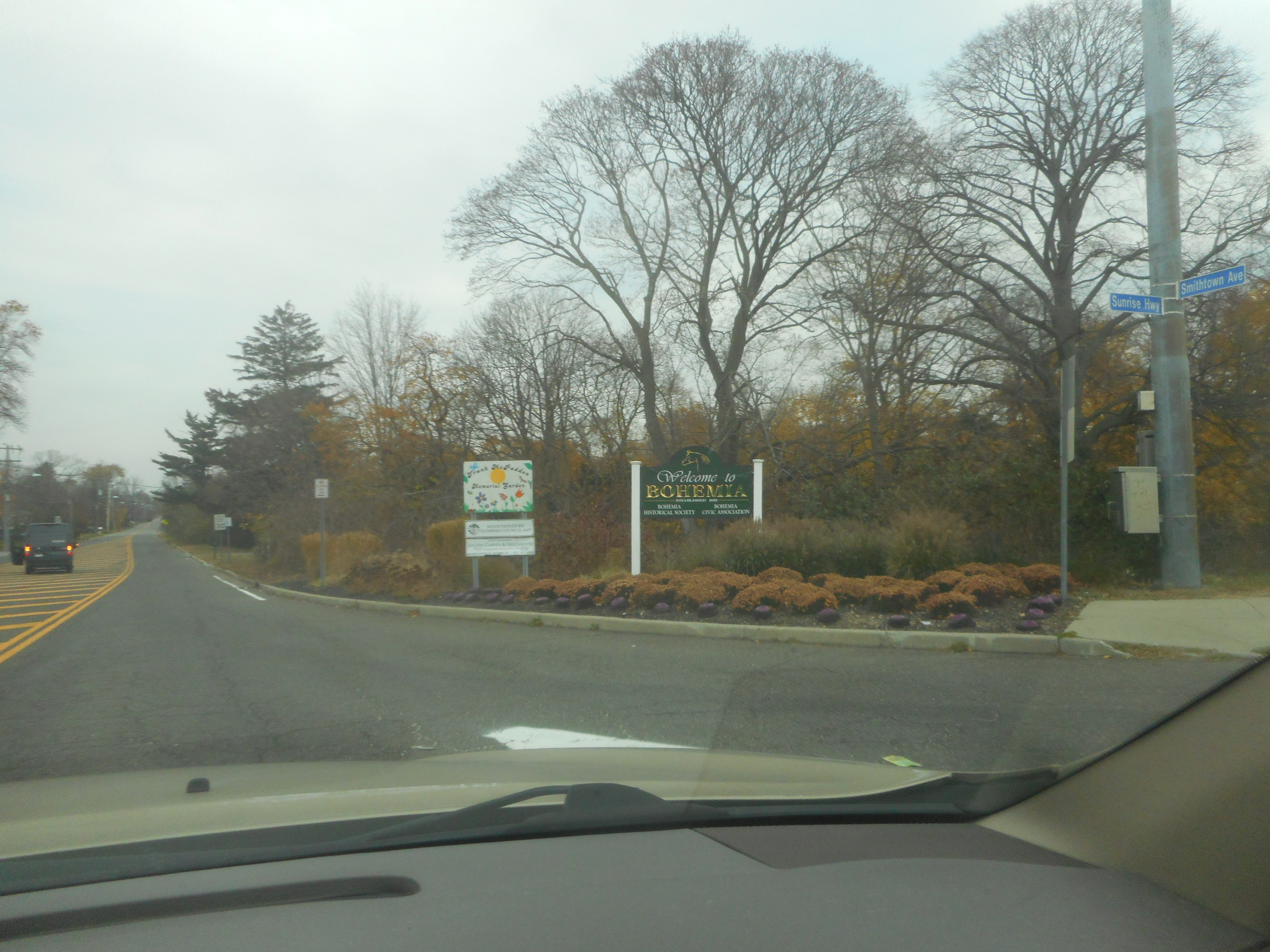
- A Bohemia welcome sign on Smithtown Avenue

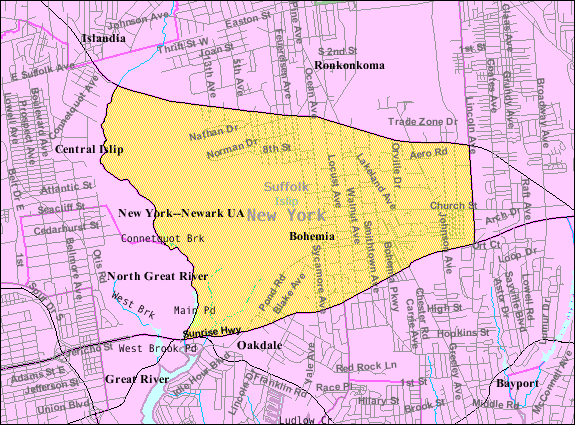
- U.S. Census Map

- Location within the state of New York
- Coordinates: 40°46′12″N 73°6′50″W
- Country: United States
- State: New York
- County: Suffolk
- Town: Islip

Area
  - Total: 8.64 sq mi (22.38 km^{2})
  - Land: 8.61 sq mi (22.29 km^{2})
  - Water: 0.035 sq mi (0.09 km^{2})
- Elevation: 66 ft (20 m)

Population (2020)
  - Total: 9,852
  - Density: 1,144.9/sq mi (442.05/km^{2})
- Time zone: UTC−5 (Eastern (EST))
  - Summer (DST): UTC−4 (EDT)
- ZIP Code: 11716
- Area codes: 631 and 934
- FIPS code: 36-07157
- GNIS feature ID: 0944396

Bohemia /boʊhiːmiːə/ is a hamlet (and census-designated place) in Suffolk County, New York, United States. The population was 9,852 at the 2020 census. It is situated along the South Shore of Long Island in the Town of Islip, approximately 50 miles from New York City.

A portion of Long Island MacArthur Airport is located within the hamlet.

Many of Bohemia's current residents trace their ethnic heritage back to southern Italy, Ireland, and the historical Czech lands (also called Bohemia). A large percentage of Bohemia's growing population has migrated to the town from western Long Island, Brooklyn, and Queens.

Connetquot River State Park is also located in Bohemia. The park provides an ideal location for horse back riding and because of this, the town harbors a unique equestrian culture. Many of the homes located along the park have stables and it is common to see locals walking their horses through the town's tree lined streets.

== History ==
The earliest known inhabitants of what is today Bohemia were the Secatogue tribe of the Algonquian peoples.

The area was founded as Bohemia in 1855 by Slavic immigrants who were the first Europeans to settle there in large numbers. These migrants came from a mountainous village near Kadaň in the Central European Kingdom of Bohemia, which is the town's namesake (Kadaň is located in present-day Czech Republic). Their pilgrimage coincided with a wave of Bohemian nationals emigrating to the United States, many of whom embodied the free spirited and enlightened lifestyles synonymous with bohemianism. They had taken part in the widespread revolutions against autocratic rule that had shaken Europe in 1848 and came seeking a new life in the United States. Work was hard to come by in New York and many of the men tried to support themselves as street musicians. An important contribution they made to the development of Long Island was adding their rich Central European folklore to the local culture, a nice complement to the also rich oral tradition of the native people. Many of the first homes they built are located on the town's avenues and are distinguished by their cross gable roofs.

For 100 years, Bohemia remained a very small village most of whose residents were of Czech descent. With the development of all of Long Island after World War II, Bohemia also grew. At the time of the centennial in 1955, the population was about 3,000. Today there about 10,000 inhabitants from many national and ethnic backgrounds.

=== Local cigar industry ===
The Slavic immigrants came to Bohemia with excellent cigar-making skills. There were once several cigar making factories in the town and the industry provided a living for many of the residents. Two notable cigar factories were Albert Kovanda's factory, located on the corner of Lakeland and Smithtown Avenues, and the M. Foster Cigar Factory, located at Ocean Avenue and Church Street. The local cigar industry continued until the 1930s when mechanized production did away with the need for hand manufacturing. No cigar factories remain today.

=== Name change ===
Over the years, there have been a number of attempts to change the name of Bohemia, which some people felt was too tied to one ethnic group. They felt this was keeping new people and new businesses from coming to the town. Proposed new names have included: Sayville Heights or North Sayville, after the town immediately to the south; Lidice, after a Czech town destroyed by Nazi troops during World War II; and MacArthur, after the airport built in the 1940s (the airport is named for American General Douglas MacArthur). None of the efforts to change the name received enough public support to be finalized.

== Geography ==
According to the United States Census Bureau, the CDP has a total area of 8.8 square miles (23 km^{2}), of which 8.7 square miles (23 km^{2}) is land and 0.04 square miles (0.10 km^{2}) (0.34%) is water.

Bohemia is bordered by Central Islip and Great River to the west; Islandia, Ronkonkoma and Lake Ronkonkoma to the north; Holbrook to the east; and Oakdale, Sayville, West Sayville, and Bayport to the south.

=== Climate ===
The climate in this area is characterized by hot, humid summers and generally mild to cool winters. According to the Köppen Climate Classification system, Bohemia has a humid subtropical climate, abbreviated "Cfa" on climate maps.

== Demographics ==
Historical population
Census	Pop.	Note	%±
2020	9,852		—
U.S. Decennial Census

=== 2020 census ===
As of the 2020 census, Bohemia had a population of 9,852. The median age was 45.0 years. 19.7% of residents were under the age of 18 and 18.5% of residents were 65 years of age or older. For every 100 females there were 96.2 males, and for every 100 females age 18 and over there were 94.3 males age 18 and over.

100.0% of residents lived in urban areas, while 0.0% lived in rural areas.

There were 3,581 households in Bohemia, of which 29.9% had children under the age of 18 living in them. Of all households, 53.2% were married-couple households, 16.9% were households with a male householder and no spouse or partner present, and 24.0% were households with a female householder and no spouse or partner present. About 22.8% of all households were made up of individuals and 10.0% had someone living alone who was 65 years of age or older.

There were 3,720 housing units, of which 3.7% were vacant. The homeowner vacancy rate was 1.1% and the rental vacancy rate was 3.3%.

Racial composition as of the 2020 census
Race	Number	Percent
White	8,391	85.2%
Black or African American	191	1.9%
American Indian and Alaska Native	7	0.1%
Asian	357	3.6%
Native Hawaiian and Other Pacific Islander	1	0.0%
Some other race	279	2.8%
Two or more races	626	6.4%
Hispanic or Latino (of any race)	1,040	10.6%

=== Income and poverty ===
The median income for a household in the CDP was $108,276, while the per capita income for the CDP was $44,747. About 7.6% of the population were below the poverty line.

== Education ==
District: Connetquot School District

High School: Connetquot High School, grades 9–12

Elementary: Sycamore Avenue School, Edward J. Bosti Elementary, Idle Hour Elementary and John Pearl Elementary, grades K-5

Grades 6–8 are serviced by the Oakdale-Bohemia Middle School, located in neighboring Oakdale, New York (formerly known as Oakdale-Bohemia Junior High School). The district has two middle schools, the other being Ronkonkoma Middle School.

The Branford Hall Career Institute is located on Johnson Avenue

The Dellacave Institute for Professional Development is located on Sycamore Avenue. The Institute offers a wide variety of courses designed for continued professional growth for lifetime learners.

== Transportation ==
The town is near the Oakdale and Ronkonkoma stations of the Long Island Rail Road, providing easy access to Manhattan where many residents work.

Long Island MacArthur Airport is partially located in Bohemia (along with the bordering hamlet of Ronkonkoma, New York). The airport serves travelers from the Greater New York Metropolitan Area and around the nation who want a more convenient alternative to the congestion at John F. Kennedy and LaGuardia Airports. The airport's most popular destinations include: Orlando, Florida; West Palm Beach, Florida; and Baltimore, Maryland.

Bohemia is a short drive from the Sayville Ferry Service of the Fire Island National Seashore which provides access to some of Long Island's most pristine and least crowded ocean beaches.

== Bohemia Historical Society ==
Dedicated to preserving the rich heritage of the hamlet, the Bohemia Historical Society (BHS) was founded in 1984. This non-profit local organization pursues this goal through its educational programs, slide presentations, involvement in community activities, a newsletter, its website and its museum. The museum was officially opened on April 26, 2009, and it houses a number of exhibits depicting life in the early days of Bohemia, a photograph collection, and a book collection that includes many historical Czech manuscripts. Additionally, the building serves as the society meeting place.

== Connetquot River State Park ==
Connetquot River State Park Preserve maintains 3,473 acres of land and water for the protection and propagation of game birds, fish and animals. Deer and waterfowl are numerous, rare nesting birds, including the osprey, are present and there are numerous rare plants, such as trailing arbutus and pyxie moss in their natural habitats. The preserve also has 50 miles of hiking, horseback riding, cross-country ski and nature trails, as well as fishing (by permit only) on the Connetquot River.

== Notable people ==
- Michael Behonick (b. 1981) – soccer player
