= West Sayville, New York =

- Hamlet and census-designated place
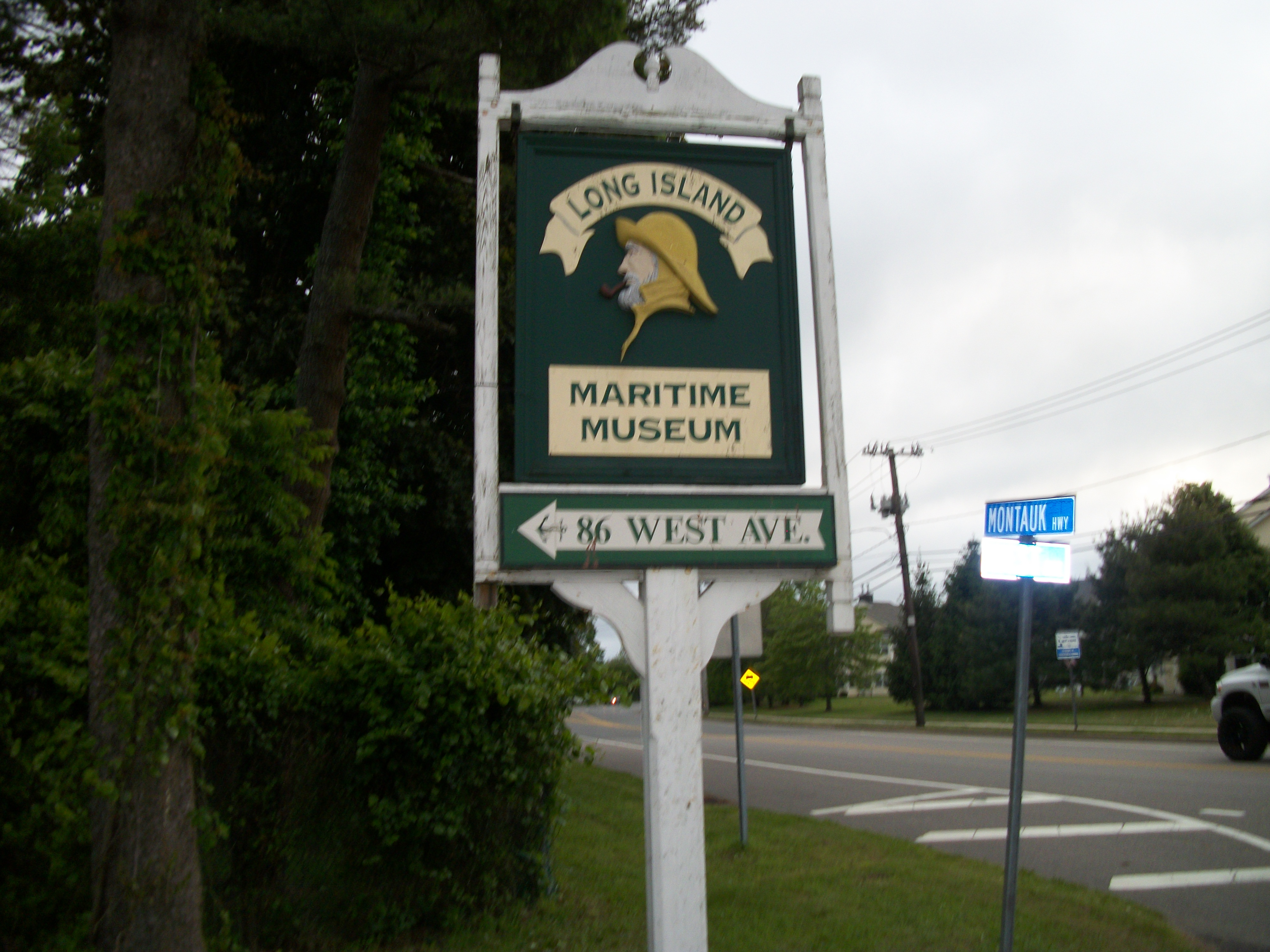
- Sign for the Long Island Maritime Museum, West Sayville's primary attraction

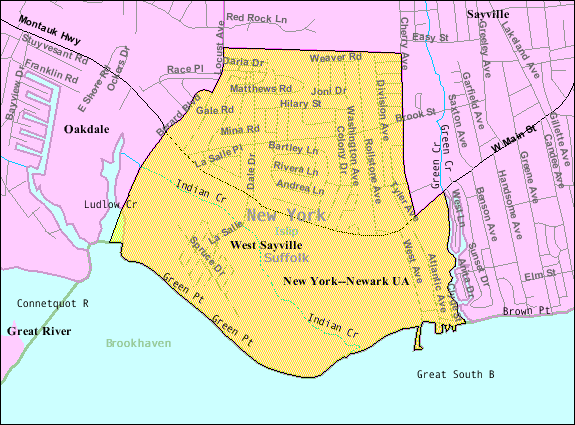
- U.S. Census map

- Location within the state of New York
- Coordinates: 40°43′54″N 73°6′18″W
- Country: United States
- State: New York
- County: Suffolk

Area
  - Total: 2.11 sq mi (5.47 km^{2})
  - Land: 1.92 sq mi (4.97 km^{2})
  - Water: 0.19 sq mi (0.50 km^{2})
- Elevation: 13 ft (4 m)

Population (2020)
  - Total: 4,872
  - Density: 2,538.9/sq mi (980.27/km^{2})
- Time zone: UTC-5 (Eastern (EST))
  - Summer (DST): UTC-4 (EDT)
- ZIP code: 11796
- Area code: 631
- FIPS code: 36-80885
- GNIS feature ID: 0970860

West Sayville is a hamlet and census-designated place (CDP) in Suffolk County, New York, United States. As of the 2020 census, West Sayville had a population of 4,872.

== Geography ==
West Sayville is located on the South Shore of Long Island in the Town of Islip. Its coordinates are 40°43’54”N 73°6’18”W (40.731594, -73.099701). West Sayville's coastline borders the Great South Bay.

According to the U.S. Census Bureau, West Sayville has a total area of 2.10 square miles (5.45 km^{2}), of which 2.10 square miles (5.44 km^{2}) is land and 0.0077 square miles (0.02 km^{2}), or 0.31%, is water.

West Sayville's ZIP code is 11796. The West Sayville Post Office is located at 12 Washington Avenue.

== Demographics ==
Historical population
Census	Pop.	Note	%±
2020	4,872		—
U.S. Decennial Census

=== 2020 census ===
As of the 2020 census, West Sayville had a population of 4,872. The median age was 46.4 years. 19.0% of residents were under the age of 18 and 17.6% of residents were 65 years of age or older. For every 100 females there were 92.4 males, and for every 100 females age 18 and over there were 90.2 males age 18 and over.

99.7% of residents lived in urban areas, while 0.3% lived in rural areas.

There were 1,765 households in West Sayville, of which 29.3% had children under the age of 18 living in them. Of all households, 61.0% were married-couple households, 13.1% were households with a male householder and no spouse or partner present, and 21.9% were households with a female householder and no spouse or partner present. About 22.2% of all households were made up of individuals and 13.1% had someone living alone who was 65 years of age or older.

There were 2,109 housing units, of which 16.3% were vacant. The homeowner vacancy rate was 1.1% and the rental vacancy rate was 7.8%.

Racial composition as of the 2020 census
Race	Number	Percent
White	4,415	90.6%
Black or African American	45	0.9%
American Indian and Alaska Native	5	0.1%
Asian	73	1.5%
Native Hawaiian and Other Pacific Islander	0	0.0%
Some other race	65	1.3%
Two or more races	269	5.5%
Hispanic or Latino (of any race)	342	7.0%

=== 2010 census ===
The United States Census Bureau reported that during the 2010 census, the population of West Sayville was 5,011, with a population density of 2,386.2 per square mile. Of the total population, 2,407 (48.0%) were males and 2,604 (52.0%) were females.

There were 1,771 households, 1,314 families and 606 families with children under the age of eighteen. In addition, there were a total of 2,124 housing units, of which 1,771 (83.4%) were occupied and 353 (16.6%) were unoccupied. Of the occupied housing units, 1,485 (83.9%) were owner-occupied units, and the remaining 286 (16.1%) were renter-occupied units.

=== Income and education ===
The median household income was reported as $95,938 by the U.S. Census Bureau with 93.3% holding a high school education.

== Education ==
West Sayville is under the jurisdiction of the Sayville School District. The two schools within West Sayville are Sayville High School at 20 Brook Street, and Cherry Avenue Elementary School on 155 Cherry Avenue. Parts of West Sayville attend Connetquot School District.

One private school is West Sayville Christian School at 37 Rollstone Avenue, serving kindergarten through eighth grade.

The former St. John's University Oakdale campus was partially in West Sayville. The university had acquired it, then La Salle Center (previously La Salle Military Academy), in 1999. The university leased the center to La Salle Center until its 2001 closure. In 2016 Amity University had purchased that campus. Amity then decided to establish a New York branch of Harrow School. Harrow International School New York is scheduled to open, in the former St. John's campus, in September 2025.

== Historic locations/people ==
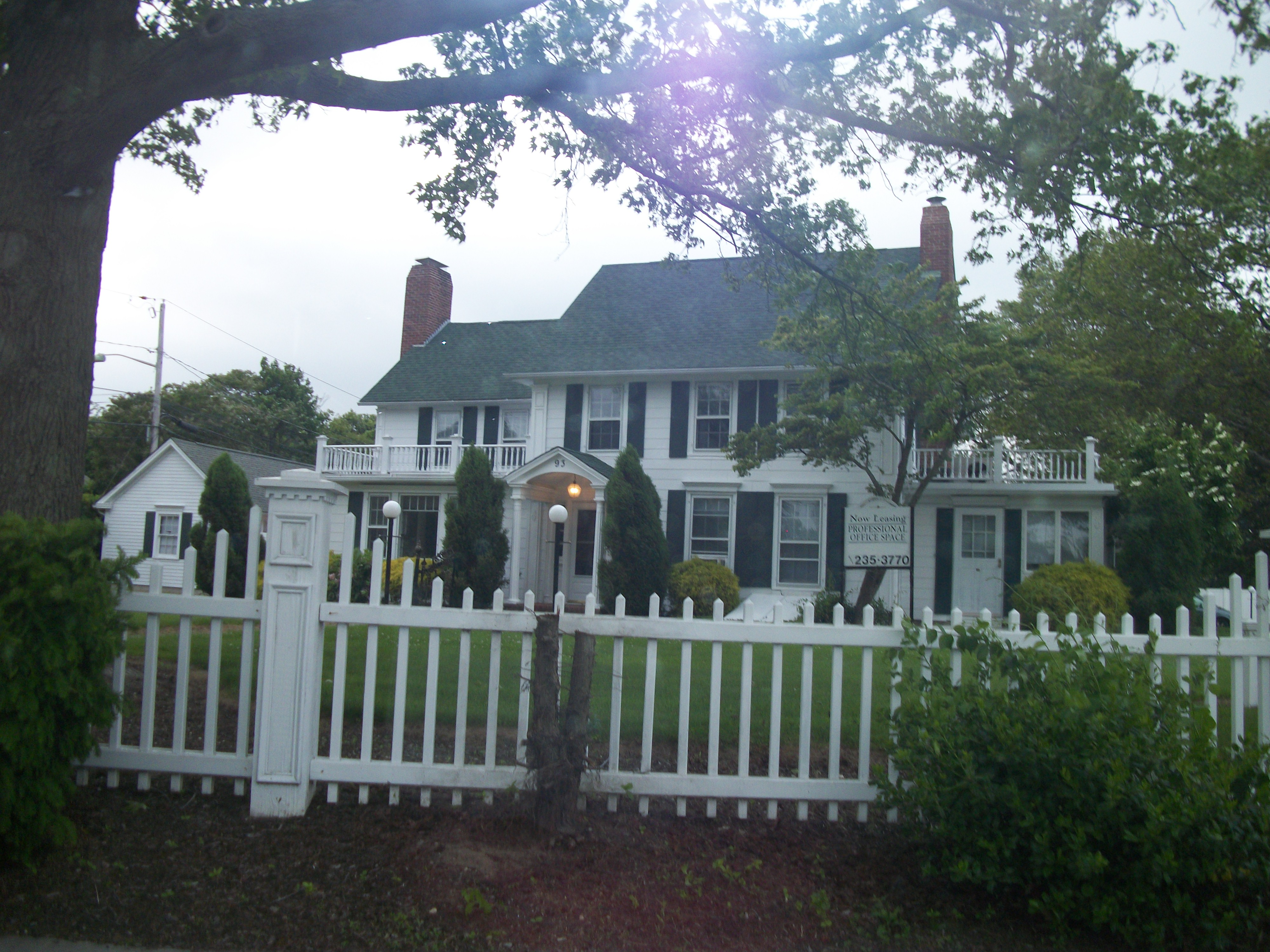
West Sayville's historic Greene House

The Samuel Greene House is located at 93 Montauk Highway. George Washington stopped at this historic house during a tour of Long Island to rest and refresh himself and his horses in 1790.

Edith Corse Evans, heir to a hide-tanning and real estate fortune with a West Sayville summer home, was a passenger on the Titanic. During the sinking of the Titanic on April 15, 1912, Edith Corse Evans gave up the last seat on the last lifeboat to save a mother of six children. Evans lost her life after the ocean liner sank into the Atlantic Ocean, but her efforts saved Caroline Brown from Acton, Massachusetts.

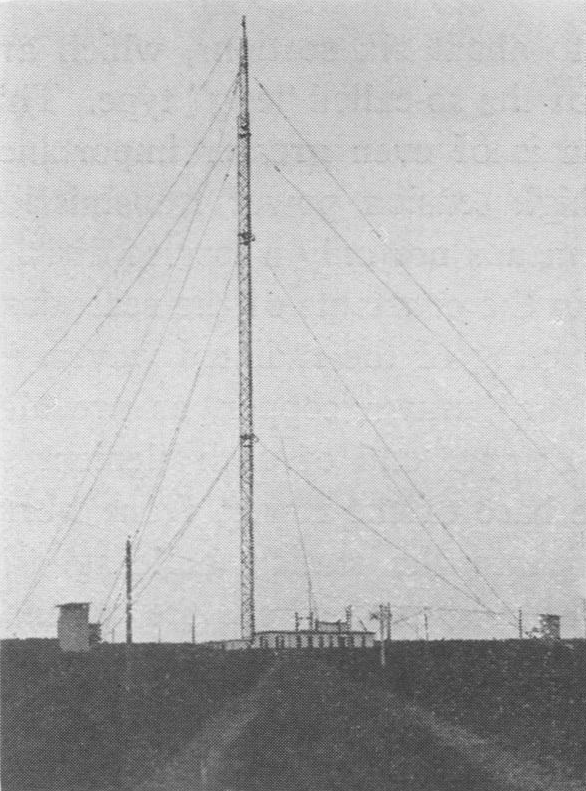
The Sayville Telefunken Wireless Station

The West Sayville Radio Station at Cherry Avenue was a German Telefunken wireless transmitter built in 1912 to broadcast primarily to Germany. In 1915, the transmitter allegedly relayed a message from the German Embassy to "get Lucy", referring to the RMS Lusitania which was sunk on May 7. Whether the signals coming from the transmitter in Sayville authorized the attack or not, they caused concern for the US government, which was raised again when it was used in the transmission of the Zimmermann Telegram by Germany to Mexico to request their assistance in the invasion of the United States during World War I. This historic transmission was sent through the West Sayville Radio Station on January 16, 1917, and President Woodrow Wilson sent a contingent of Marines to seize the wireless station in order to ensure that no further encrypted messages were sent. This was the first hostile action taken by the United States against Germany during World War I. Today the land where the transmitter was located is part of the Sayville National Wildlife Refuge.

== Emergency services ==
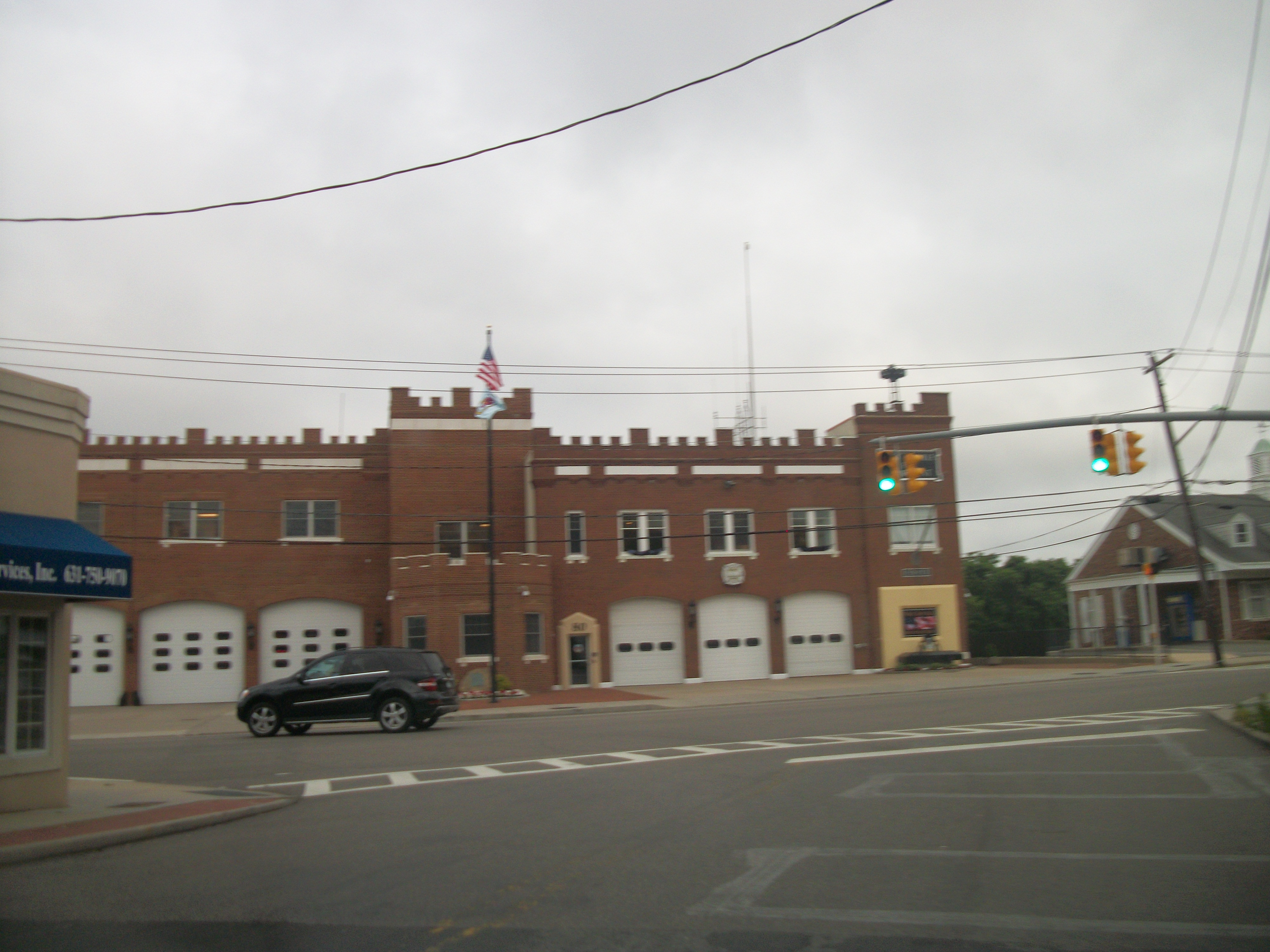
West Sayville Fire Department as seen from across Montauk Highway

West Sayville is part of the West Sayville-Oakdale Fire District. The West Sayville Fire Department is the volunteer fire department agency employed by the West Sayville-Oakdale Fire District to provide fire protection for this area. This agency responds to all fire-related emergencies and motor vehicle crashes with personal injury, as well as numerous other emergency incidents within the borders of the West Sayville-Oakdale Fire District. The West Sayville Fire Department is a certified New York State fire department.

West Sayville receives emergency medical services from the Sayville Community Ambulance Company. This volunteer ambulance company responds to all medical emergencies within the West Sayville area. They are a certified New York State Department of Health, Emergency Medical Service agency that provides Advanced Life Support (ALS) care.

West Sayville is protected by the Suffolk County Police Department's Fifth Precinct. The Suffolk County Police Department is an accredited police agency that responds to all incidents that require law enforcement personnel. They also provide crime scene investigation, arson investigation, detective and many other related law enforcement services to the West Sayville area. West Sayville is also home to the Suffolk County Police Department Detectives Association, located at 465 Main Street.

West Sayville receives emergency management services from the Town of Islip Office of Emergency Management and the Suffolk County Office of Emergency Management.

== Parks and recreation ==
The Long Island Maritime Museum is located at 86 West Avenue in West Sayville, which is committed to the research, preservation and interpretation of the region's rich nautical heritage and the role of Long Island in their national maritime story. Since 2003, the park has held the annual "Seafood Fest" that includes food vendors and live music.

=== Suffolk County parks ===
West Sayville's County Parks Administration Building and Operations Center are within Charles R. Dominy County Park, all of which are located on 200 Main Street. Other county parks in West Sayville include Green's Creek County Park/Marina on Clyde Street and Cherry Avenue County Dog Park on Cherry Avenue. The Mansion at West Sayville (Meadowedge) sits on the grounds of the West Sayville County Park. It was built in 1910 as a gift from Commodore Frederick and Mrs. Bourne to their daughter Florence. It is now a catering facility owned by a private company.

=== Town of Islip parks ===
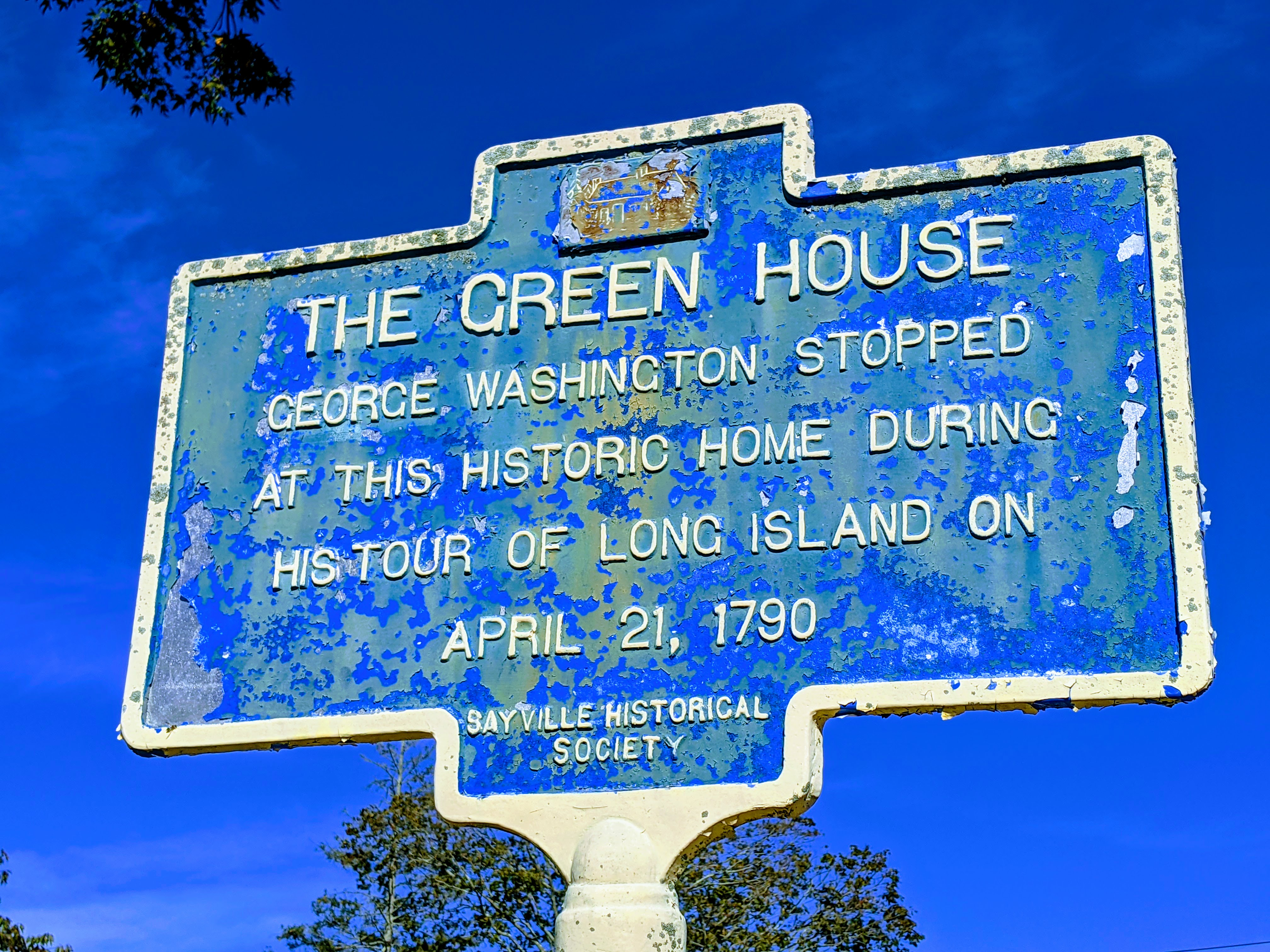
Historic marker at Samuel Greene home

Town of Islip parks include the Division Avenue Park/Playground on the street it was named after, the West Avenue Docks and the Baymen Soccer Complex on Cherry Avenue.

== Churches ==
- West Sayville Reformed Bible Church is located at 31 Rollstone Avenue.
- Malankara Orthodox Syrian Church, also known as the Saint Mary's Orthodox Church, is located at 38 Cherry Avenue.
