= Great River, New York =

Great River, New York Connetquot
- Hamlet and census-designated place
- The Great River Fire Department in 2010
- Motto: The Best Is Yet To Come
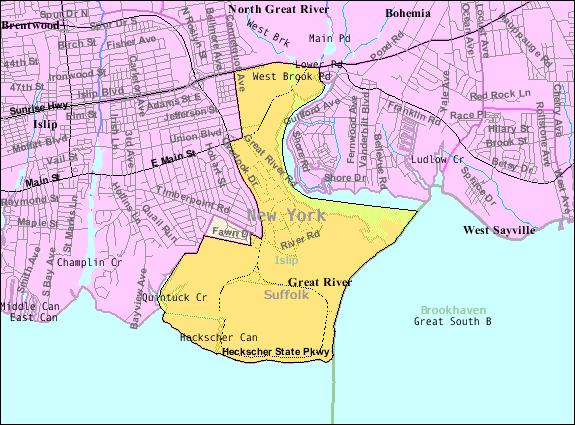
- U.S. Census map

- Location on Long Island Location within the state of New York
- Coordinates: 40°43′29″N 73°9′36″W
- Country: United States
- State: New York
- County: Suffolk
- Town: Islip

Area
  - Total: 5.80 sq mi (15.01 km^{2})
  - Land: 4.19 sq mi (10.84 km^{2})
  - Water: 1.61 sq mi (4.17 km^{2})
- Elevation: 13 ft (4 m)

Population (2020)
  - Total: 2,005
  - Density: 479.0/sq mi (184.96/km^{2})
- Time zone: UTC-5 (Eastern (EST))
  - Summer (DST): UTC-4 (EDT)
- ZIP code: 11739
- Area codes: 631, 934
- FIPS code: 36-30235
- GNIS feature ID: 0951648

Great River is a suburban hamlet and Census-designated place (CDP) located within the Town of Islip in Suffolk County, on Long Island, in New York, United States. The population was 2,005 at the time of the 2020 census.

The community's name is a translation of "Connetquot," an Algonquian word for "Great River." Prior to the 1900s Great River was primarily home to wealthy families on mansion estates.

Great River's buildings include a New York City–style steak house in a turn of the century (20th) Public house, a delicatessen, a rural delivery post office and the Great River Fire Department.

== History ==
For centuries, clusters of the Algonquin people known as the Montaukett people occupied the territory known as Secatogue, now the town of Islip. They lived in clusters located at West Islip (Secatogue), Bay Shore (Penataquit), Great River, and Oakdale (Connetquot).

On November 29, 1683, William Nicoll (Nicolls), founder of the Town of Islip and son of New York City Mayor Matthias Nicoll, was awarded the first royal patent to the east end of what is now the Town of Islip. Nicoll purchased land from Sachem (Paramount chief) Winnequaheagh of Connetquot. He named his 50,000-acre (20,000 ha) plantation (an 8-by-10-mile (13 by 16 km) tract of land) "Islip Grange", in honor of his ancestral home of Islip (UK) in East Northamptonshire, England, from which Matthias emigrated in 1664. Nicoll's domain extended from East Islip to Bayport and embraced the present-day communities of Sayville, West Sayville, Oakdale, Great River, Islip Terrace, Central Islip, Hauppauge, Holbrook, Bohemia, Brentwood, Holtsville, and a portion of Ronkonkoma. Nicoll paid an annual quit-rent (tax) to Thomas Dongan, 2nd Earl of Limerick and Governor of the Province of New York, of five bushels of good winter wheat or twenty-five (25) shillings payable annually on March 25.

Other early land patentees were Andrew Gibb (Islip hamlet), John Mowbray (Bay Shore, originally Awixa), Stephan Van Cortlandt (Sagtikos Manor), and Thomas Willets (West Islip).

William Nicholl also purchased five islands from Winnequaheagh on November 19, 1687, including Hollins Island (a.k.a. East Fire Island.) The purchase was confirmed on a patent by Governor Dongan on June 4, 1688. Altogether William Nicoll acquired four patents for land – the final purchase was on September 20, 1697, issued by Governor Benjamin Fletcher. Under Col. Fletcher, piracy was a leading economic development tool in New York City's competition with the ports of Boston and Philadelphia. New York City had become a safe place for pirates (freebooters) who carried "real money" into the impoverished colony.

Nicoll's estate eventually became the largest manor on Long Island.

By 1710, the colonial government passed an act to enable the precinct of Islip in the County of Suffolk to elect two assessors, a collector, a constable, and a supervisor. The people finally had a voice. Growth, however, remained at a standstill until the American Revolutionary War ended when in the seventeen (17) years that followed there was more progress than in the fifty (50) years preceding. This activity was partly due to the impact of American shipping.

Great River hamlet was formerly known as Youngsport. In the 1840s the Youngs family lived about one and a half miles south of Montauk Highway on Great River Road. Erastus Youngs and his family began building and repairing boats on the west shore of the Connetquot River near Great South Bay. With hardly anyone else around (21 houses), the place was called Youngsport for thirty years. Youngsport had one store and a freight station on the South Side Railroad of Long Island two miles north of it. The inhabitants were principally known as bay men. Alva Vanderbilt (later Alva Belmont), the Oakdale socialite suffragette, bought the Youngs' home and gave it to Trinity Lutheran Parish of Brooklyn, which used it as a summer camp called "Seaside Camp" for city children. Youngsport Village's name was changed to Great River in either 1870 or 1881.

William Lawrence Breeze purchased 290-acre (120 ha) "Timber Point Farm" from William Nicoll in 1883.

The Great River freight station was enhanced to a passenger station in the summer of 1897.

William Nicoll 7th (great-great-great grandson of the original William) served as School Commissioner of East Islip. He was the last owner of Islip Grange. He served as Warden of Emmanuel Church in Great River for 22 years, and ministered to the small cemetery there in which he is now buried. William 7th donated part of the land on which the present East Islip Junior High School now stands.

Heckscher State Park (1,600 acres (650 ha)), named for the industrialist August Heckscher, was part of Nicoll's original estate and the location of the Nicoll Manor house. Heckscher Park's land (Nicholls Neck) was once the location of the 19th-century estates of J. Neal Plumb (original location) and in 1886 George Campbell Taylor (1,500 acres (610 ha)). This should not be mistaken for the similarly named, fairly close but much smaller (18.5 acres (7.5 ha)) national historic district of Heckscher Park in Huntington on the North Shore of Long Island.

== Geography ==
According to the United States Census Bureau, the CDP has a total area of 5.2 square miles (13.4 km^{2}), of which 4.6 square miles (11.9 km^{2}) is land and 0.58 square miles (1.5 km^{2}), or 11.46%, is water.

Great River is situated approximately 50 miles (80 km) (55 mi driving) east of New York City on the South Shore of Long Island, adjoining the Great South Bay, protected from the Atlantic Ocean by Fire Island.

The Great River Post Office – located at 62 Great River Road – is a rural delivery post office, where all mail is only delivered to P.O. boxes required to be included in one's mailing address.

The hamlet and CDP of Great River comprises 465 land parcels, and spans four hurricane evacuation zones.

Heckscher State Park is located within the Great River CDP – although most references by New York State for mailing addresses are listed as East Islip.

== Demographics ==
Historical population
Census	Pop.	Note	%±
2000	1,546		—
2010	1,489		−3.7%
2020	2,005		34.7%
U.S. Decennial Census

=== 2020 census ===
As of the 2020 census, Great River had a population of 2,005. The median age was 49.3 years. 15.7% of residents were under the age of 18 and 19.9% of residents were 65 years of age or older. For every 100 females there were 92.6 males, and for every 100 females age 18 and over there were 87.3 males age 18 and over.

93.4% of residents lived in urban areas, while 6.6% lived in rural areas.

There were 798 households in Great River, of which 23.6% had children under the age of 18 living in them. Of all households, 56.6% were married-couple households, 12.4% were households with a male householder and no spouse or partner present, and 25.1% were households with a female householder and no spouse or partner present. About 23.7% of all households were made up of individuals and 9.8% had someone living alone who was 65 years of age or older.

There were 842 housing units, of which 5.2% were vacant. The homeowner vacancy rate was 0.8% and the rental vacancy rate was 5.9%.

Racial composition as of the 2020 census
Race	Number	Percent
White	1,805	90.0%
Black or African American	30	1.5%
American Indian and Alaska Native	1	0.0%
Asian	36	1.8%
Native Hawaiian and Other Pacific Islander	0	0.0%
Some other race	30	1.5%
Two or more races	103	5.1%
Hispanic or Latino (of any race)	155	7.7%

=== 2010 census ===
As of the 2010 census, there were 1,489 people, 503 households, and 403 families residing in the CDP, down from 1,546 people at the 2000 census. The population density was 323.7 inhabitants per square mile (125.0/km^{2}). There were 517 housing units at an average density of 112.4 per square mile (43.4/km^{2}). The racial makeup of the CDP was 96.8% White, 0.5% Black, 0.0% Native American, 1.8% Asian, 0.3% some other race, and 0.5% from two or more races. Hispanic or Latino of any race were 4.2% of the population.

There were 503 households, out of which 36.6% had children under the age of 18 living with them, 69.4% were headed by married couples living together, 6.6% had a female householder with no husband present, and 19.9% were non-families. 15.5% of all households were made up of individuals, and 8.2% were someone living alone who was 65 years of age or older. The average household size was 2.96 and the average family size was 3.36.

In the CDP, the population was spread out, with 24.0% under the age of 18, 9.0% from 18 to 24, 16.2% from 25 to 44, 35.0% from 45 to 64, and 15.8% who were 65 years of age or older. The median age was 45.5 years. For every 100 females, there were 105.4 males. For every 100 females age 18 and over, there were 100.5 males.

=== Income and poverty ===
For the period 2007 to 2011, the median annual income for a household in the CDP was $127,578, and the median income for a family was $176,974. Males had a median income of $80,625 versus $70,781 for females. The per capita income for the CDP was $57,414. Because of high margins of error, the number of persons living under the poverty line was not known.

== Government ==
Great River votes in New York's 2nd congressional district. National elections are held at the Great River Fire Department, with local election years at Timber Point Elementary School.

== Education ==
Great River is located within the boundaries of (and is thus served by) the East Islip Union Free School District. Students in the hamlet go to Timber Point Elementary School, East Islip Middle School, and East Islip High School. The school district's colors are red and white, and athletic teams are the Redmen (no mascot).

Timber Point Elementary School was one of four L.I. National Blue Ribbon Schools Program honorees in 2012. The National Blue Ribbon Schools Program honors public and non-public schools whose students achieve at very high levels. The program is part of a larger U.S. Department of Education effort to identify and disseminate knowledge about best school leadership and teaching practices.

== Arts and culture ==
Great River Community Association's (GRCA) mission is to foster, promote and protect the civic and community interests of the residents of Great River. GRCA sponsors a variety of events during the year for residents to enjoy. Ex: Easter Egg Hunt, Memorial Day Parade, Paint & Sip at the Firehouse, Halloween Parade, and a Holiday- Tree and Menorah Lighting Party. The community also enjoys an Annual Holiday Boat Parade complete with Grucci Fireworks on the Beautiful Connetquot River.

Troop 205 of the Suffolk County Council (Boy Scouts of America) Sagtikos District is an active participant in the community of Youth organizations in the United States. Eagle Scout, the highest scouting achievement, has been bestowed approximately eighty-five (85) times since 1991 to participants in Troop 205 from the local Islip area.

== Infrastructure ==
=== Transportation ===
==== Rail ====
The Great River Long Island Rail Road station in 2011

The Great River station on the Montauk Branch of the Long Island Rail Road is located at Connetquot Avenue and Hawthorne Avenue within Great River, between Sunrise Highway (NYS Route 27) and Montauk Highway (Route 27A).

Prior to the establishment of passenger service, the site of Great River station was occupied by a freight-only station built by the South Side Railroad of Long Island and known as Youngsport Station. This was a popular stop for Gilded Age wealthy businessmen traveling to South Side Sportsmen's Club in Connetquot River State Park Preserve after the Club House Station closed in 1897.

==== Bus ====
Suffolk County Transit Bus routes also serve Great River.

=== Emergency services ===
==== Fire ====
Patch of the Great River Fire Department.

The Great River Fire Department (established in 1916) is a volunteer fire department, located at 108 River Road in front of Timber Point County Park, east of the entrance to Heckscher State Park. Heckscher State Park and Bayard Cutting Arboretum are serviced within Great River Fire District. The Great River Fire Department competes as "Team River Rat."

==== Police ====
The community lies within the Suffolk County Police Department's 3rd precinct.

==== Ambulance ====
Exchange Ambulance of the Islips (established 1951) provides 24/7 Emergency Medical Service (EMS) coverage for Great River.

== Landmarks ==
- Connetquot River
- Bayard Cutting Arboretum State Park
- Westbrook
- Heckscher State Park

== Notable people ==
- William Nicoll (Nicholls), an English aristocrat who was awarded a royal patent, purchased "East of Islip" surrounding land on November 29, 1683.
- William Nicoll 3rd, known as "Lawyer Nicoll", served as Clerk of Suffolk County, New York from 1749 until his death in 1780. He erected St. Johns Episcopal Church and Cemetery.
- Benjamin Nicoll, brother of William Nicoll 3rd. Benjamin left a widow, Charity Floyd, who eventually married the Reverend Doctor Samuel Johnson.
- William Nicoll 4th, the fourth owner of Islip Grange, lived only 39 years. During his lifetime, the Nicoll estate dwindled to 40,000 acres (16,000 ha).
- William Nicoll 7th, School Commissioner of East Islip, New York, was the last owner of Islip Grange. He served as Warden of Emmanuel Episcopal Church in Great River for 22 years and ministered to the small cemetery there in which he is buried. William 7th also donated part of the land on which the present (2015) East Islip Junior High School now stands.
- Frances Louisa Nicoll, wife of Civil War brevet lieutenant colonel and eventually Civil War Union Brigadier general William Ludlow. Frances was sister to William Nicoll 7th.
- George L. Lorillard (March 26, 1843 – 1892), tobacco manufacturer and racehorse owner
- William Bayard Cutting, attorney, financier, real estate developer, sugar beet refiner, ferry operator, railroad baron and philanthropist, owned a 992-acre (4.01 km^{2}) estate in Great River eventually given to the people of Long Island by Bayard Cutting's widow, Olivia, and daughter, Olivia, as Bayard Cutting Arboretum State Park.
- Bronson M. Cutting, born in Great River, Republican to the United States Senate from New Mexico, publisher, and military attaché who was killed in an airplane crash.
- Angel de la Torre, Spain's first golf professional, was golf pro at Timber Point Golf Course in 1925.
- Philip Boyle (1961–), Republican, 2013 New York 4th Senatorial District Senator, lived in Great River at one time and is still active in the Great River Fire Department in 2015.
- Tim Melia (1986–), born in Great River, May 15, 1986, is an American soccer player who plays goalie (# 29) for Sporting Kansas City (2015– ) of Major League Soccer. Melia played for the Long Island Rough Riders in the USL Premier Development League in 2007.

== In popular culture ==
- The Age of Innocence, directed by Martin Scorsese and starring Daniel Day-Lewis, Winona Ryder, Michelle Pfeiffer and Joanne Woodward, based on the 1920 novel by Edith Wharton, about the Gilded Age, portraying New York's high society, filmed the Archery/lawn party scene (1:28,) at the historic Bayard Cutting Arboretum.

== See also ==
- East Islip, New York
- Oakdale, New York
