= McNeece =

McNeece is a surname. Notable people with the surname include:

- Francis McNeece Whittle (1823–1902), American Anglican bishop
- Jimmy McNeece (fl. 1976–1980), American boxer
- Tom McNeece (born 1958), American boxer, brother of Jimmy
