= East Islip Union Free School District =

School district in New York, United States

The East Islip Union Free School District (more commonly known as the East Islip School District) is a school district serving portions of the South Shore of Long Island in Suffolk County, New York. Communities within the district include East Islip, Great River, Islip Terrace, most of North Great River, and a part of Central Islip – all of which are located within the Town of Islip.

== History ==
The district's roots can be traced back to before 1820. For many years, East Islip was known as "East of Islip." The district was just the third in the Town of Islip, and as a result, used to have much larger borders before other districts sprouted up. In addition to its modern borders, it also served Oakdale and Bohemia (now served by Connetquot). There was a one room schoolhouse on the modern Timber Point property, opened in 1857. The following year, another school was opened. This one had two stories with one room on each floor. A three room school opened in 1885, and by 1902 six additional rooms had been added. In 1897, East Islip opened a junior school. This school served students grades 9 and 10, and after exiting this school they could finish high school at Islip High School. Construction started in 1924 on a three story building in 1924, and the cornerstone was placed in 1925. This school became East Islip's first high school, the precursor to modern East Islip High School. It served students grades K-12, and would do so until 1950. An elementary school was opened in 1957. The reason for all of these schools and add-ons was the rapidly increasing populations of the area.

In 2009 the school district leadership chose not to have a moment of silence in regards to the September 11 attacks at elementary schools, prompting controversy.

In 2023, Paul Manzo became the interim superintendent.

In 2023, a New York State law forced East Islip to phase out their longtime mascot of the Redmen, due to its Native American origin.

In 2024 Dormitory Authority of the State of New York permitted this district to receive over $31,700,000 in bonds that are exempt from taxes.

== Schools ==
Secondary

- East Islip High School
- East Islip Middle School

Elementary

- Connetquot Elementary School
- John F. Kennedy Elementary School
- Ruth C. Kinney Elementary School
- Timber Point Elementary School

== See also ==
- List of school districts in New York
- Central Islip Public Schools
- Islip Public Schools
- West Islip Public Schools
