= Neece =

Neece can refer to:

- An archaic spelling of niece, or the daughter of one's sibling
- William H. Neece (1831 – 1909), an American politician

== See also ==
- McNeece, a surname
