= Champlin Creek =

Stream on Long Island, New York, US

Coordinates: 40.721437°N 73.203106°W

Champlin Creek is on Long Island, located between the hamlets of Islip and East Islip, flowing southward into the Great South Bay between the Seatuck National Wildlife Refuge and The Moorings. The fish and wildlife habitat is an approximate three and one-half mile length of the stream, extending from Knapps Lake, just north of the Main Street, to near its headwaters north of the Southern State Parkway. Champlin Creek is a relatively clean, cold, free-flowing, freshwater stream, generally less than 6 feet (1.8 m) wide, partially vegetated sandy substrate. The creek is bordered by limited areas of wet forest land and suburban residential development. Champlin Creek is one of only a few free-flowing, spring-fed streams on Long Island that have remained in a relatively natural state. This creek provides habitat conditions suitable for natural reproduction by brook trout, and supports one of approximately 6 known wild populations of this species on Long Island. In addition to the native fish populations in Champlin Creek, brown trout and rainbow trout are stocked in the stream by the NYSDEC, provide a recreational fishery of county-level significance. Public access for fishing the area is available along the east side of Knapps Lake and at road crossings.
