= East Islip, New York =

- Hamlet and census-designated place
- The Cpl. Robert C Pope II Memorial in East Islip in 2013

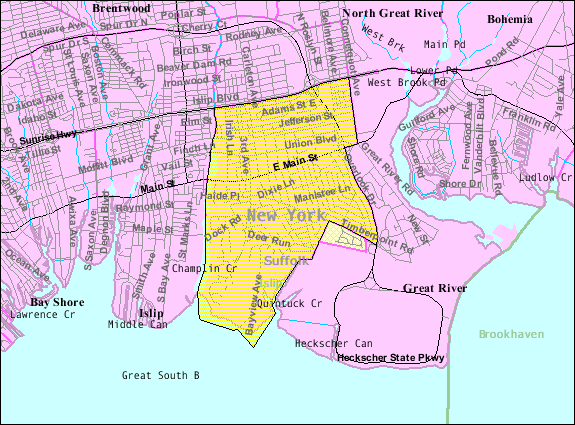
- U.S. Census map

- Location on Long Island Location within the state of New York
- Coordinates: 40°43′55″N 73°11′6″W
- Country: United States
- State: New York
- County: Suffolk
- Town: Islip
- Named for: Its location east of the hamlet of Islip

Area
  - Total: 4.42 sq mi (11.45 km^{2})
  - Land: 3.95 sq mi (10.23 km^{2})
  - Water: 0.47 sq mi (1.22 km^{2})
- Elevation: 16 ft (5 m)

Population (2020)
  - Total: 13,931
  - Density: 3,525.9/sq mi (1,361.35/km^{2})
- Time zone: UTC-5 (Eastern (EST))
  - Summer (DST): UTC-4 (EDT)
- ZIP code: 11730
- Area codes: 631, 934
- FIPS code: 36-22315
- GNIS feature ID: 0949137

East Islip is a hamlet and Census-designated place (CDP) located within the Town of Islip in Suffolk County, on the South Shore of Long Island, in New York, United States. The population was 13,931 at the time of the 2020 census.

== History ==
Originally referred to as "East of Islip", the name was acquired in 1890 from the estate of William Nicoll, an English aristocrat who purchased the surrounding land in 1683 to erect a family residence. Nicoll's purchase comprised 51,000 acres (210 km^{2}) from the Secatogue Indians, reaching as far as Bayport to the east, Babylon to the west and Ronkonkoma to the north. His mansion, Islip Grange, named after his family's ancestral estate at Northampshire, England, stood near the shoreline of what is now Heckscher State Park.

East Islip, as well as many hamlets along Long Island's south shore, was once an enclave for some of the nation's wealthiest families. Its estates at one time included the Hollins, Gulden, and Knapp estates, among others. An original estate mansion, Brookwood Hall, has passed from its last private owners, the Thorne family (originally of Great Neck during the Dutch colonial era) and now serves as a municipal building for the Town of Islip. The Bradish Johnson estate known as Woodland Lodge became the home of the Hewlett School, a private boarding school which closed shortly after the turn of the century. Some estate and early farmlands were donated to the Roman Catholic church and make up the current grounds of St Mary's of East Islip, which includes a private elementary and middle school, in addition to church and other parish buildings. The original Westbrook farm on the boundary between East Islip and Oakdale, near the Bayard Cutting Arboretum, has ceased operations, and its fields are now the home of East Islip Soccer, near the fields set aside for the Little League of the Islips.

Today, modern East Islip is composed of much smaller, yet affluent communities and few estates. Many of these newer communities were built on the land that was once part of former estates that were sold off, most notably the estate of Percy G. Williams. The Moorings, an opulent waterfront guard-gated private community, is one of the hamlet's premier neighborhoods. Other neighborhoods within the hamlet include Deer Run and Country Village as well as the Beecher Estates.

== Geography ==
According to the United States Census Bureau, the CDP has a total area of 4.1 square miles (10.5 km^{2}), of which 3.9 square miles (10.2 km^{2}) is land and 0.12 square miles (0.3 km^{2}), or 2.68%, is water.

East Islip borders four other hamlets: Islip is to the west, Islip Terrace is to the north, North Great River is to the northeast, and Great River is to the east. The Great South Bay is to the south. It is the home of an experimental shellfish hatchery operated by the Town of Islip, near the town-operated public beach on the bay.

Historical population
Census	Pop.	Note	%±
2000	14,078		—
2010	14,475		2.8%
2020	13,931		−3.8%
U.S. Decennial Census

== Demographics ==
=== 2020 census ===
As of the 2020 census, East Islip had a population of 13,931. The median age was 43.1 years. 20.5% of residents were under the age of 18 and 16.7% of residents were 65 years of age or older. For every 100 females, there were 95.2 males, and for every 100 females age 18 and over there were 91.5 males age 18 and over.

100.0% of residents lived in urban areas, while 0.0% lived in rural areas.

There were 4,769 households in East Islip, of which 33.8% had children under the age of 18 living in them. Of all households, 61.1% were married-couple households, 11.7% were households with a male householder and no spouse or partner present, and 22.4% were households with a female householder and no spouse or partner present. About 17.4% of all households were made up of individuals and 9.3% had someone living alone who was 65 years of age or older.

There were 4,918 housing units, of which 3.0% were vacant. The homeowner vacancy rate was 0.8% and the rental vacancy rate was 4.8%.

Racial composition as of the 2020 census
Race	Number	Percent
White	11,985	86.0%
Black or African American	237	1.7%
American Indian and Alaska Native	31	0.2%
Asian	312	2.2%
Native Hawaiian and Other Pacific Islander	0	0.0%
Some other race	382	2.7%
Two or more races	984	7.1%
Hispanic or Latino (of any race)	1,454	10.4%

=== 2000 census ===
As of the 2000 census, there were 4,578 households, and 3,731 families residing in the CDP. The population density was 3,428.5 inhabitants per square mile (1,323.8/km^{2}). There were 4,661 housing units, at an average density of 1,135.1 per square mile (438.3/km^{2}). The racial makeup of the CDP was 96.20% White, 3.89% Hispanic, 0.57% African American, 0.06% Native American, 1.41% Asian, 0.02% Pacific Islander, 0.96% from other races, and 0.78% from two or more races.

There were 4,578 households, out of which 42.9% had children under the age of 18 living with them, 68.0% were married couples living together, 10.0% had a female householder with no husband present, and 18.5% were non-families. 15.2% of all households were made up of individuals, and 7.3% had someone living alone who was 65 years of age or older. The average household size was 3.03 and the average family size was 3.38.

The population of the CDP was spread out, with 28.5% under the age of 18, 6.3% from 18 to 24, 32.3% from 25 to 44, 21.1% from 45 to 64, and 11.8% who were 65 years of age or older. The median age was 37 years. For every 100 females, there were 95.2 males. For every 100 females age 18 and over, there were 90.1 males.

The median income for a household in the CDP was $71,106, and the median income for a family was $77,593. Males had a median income of $51,554 versus $36,959 for females. The per capita income for the CDP was $27,356. About 2.8% of families and 3.7% of the population were below the poverty line, including 4.3% of those under age 18 and 4.0% of those age 65 or over.

== Education ==
The East Islip Union Free School District serves the families of East Islip, Great River and Islip Terrace; approximately 3,500 students were enrolled in the district's schools as of 2023. Two of the district's four elementary schools, John F. Kennedy Elementary School and Timber Point Elementary School, are located in East Islip, south of Montauk Highway – while the other two, Ruth C. Kinney Elementary School and Connetquot Elementary School, are located in Islip Terrace.

== Parks and recreation ==
East Islip is home to two public marinas and one private marina. Two additional marinas are operated in Great River within the grounds of the Timber Point Country Club, the site of East Islip's only golf course. East Islip continues its tradition of sports hunting and fishing, as its marinas are home to several annual fishing tournaments and its marshes continue to serve many duck and other water fowl hunters.

== Notable people ==
- Margaret Becker, contemporary Christian singer
- Chris Beyrer, doctor and humanitarian
- Anthony Cumia, co-host of The Opie and Anthony Show; lived in East Islip in his youth
- Boomer Esiason, former NFL quarterback for the Cincinnati Bengals, New York Jets, and Arizona Cardinals
- Tony Graffanino, former Major League Baseball infielder
- Henry B. Hollins, one-time partner of J. P. Morgan; resided at Meadow Farm, a 600-acre (2.4 km^{2}) estate
- Charles L. Lawrance, aircraft engineer and designer of the engine for Charles Lindbergh's Spirit of St. Louis; resided on a 116-acre (0.47 km^{2}) waterfront estate that was later redeveloped as gated community known as The Moorings
- Ralph Macchio, actor, best known for appearing in the movie The Karate Kid; resided in East Islip, as well as Dix Hills
- Tim Melia, goalkeeper for Sporting Kansas City
- Rohan Murphy, double-amputee paralympic athlete and motivational speaker
- Rosanne Sorrentino, actress/singer; stage and film productions of Annie
- Kathy Troccoli, contemporary Christian singer.

== See also ==
- Central Islip, New York
- Islip (hamlet), New York
- Islip Terrace, New York
- West Islip, New York
