= Winnequaheagh =

17th-century Sachem chief

Winnequaheagh was a Sachem (Chief) of the subsect of the Algonquian peoples known as the Secatogue Tribe (Native American). Historians reference Long Island Algonquian Indians as Montauketts. The farm of the Willets at Islip is called Secatogue Neck, and here is supposed to have been the principal settlement and probably the residence of Winnequaheagh, Sachem of Connetquot in 1683.

Algonquin Indians inhabited Long Island for centuries and the Secatogue tribe occupied all of the area in the Town of Islip. Secatogue’s principal villages were at West Islip (Secatogue), Bay Shore (Penataquit), and Oakdale (Connetquot).

On November 29, 1683, William Nicoll (Nicholls) founder of the Town of Islip, NY, a son of New York City Mayor Matthias Nicoll, was awarded the first ”Royal Patent” of the east end of what is now the Town of Islip. Mr. Nicoll purchased land from Sachem (Chief) Winnequaheagh of Connetquot. He named his 50,000 acre (8 x 10 mile tract of land (210 km2)) plantation, "Islip Grange," in honor of Nicoll's ancestral home in East Northamptonshire, England, from which Matthias emigrated in 1664: Islip, England. Significantly, this eventually became the largest manor on Long Island.

Winnequaheagh also sold five islands to William Nicoll (Nicholls) on November 19, 1687 including Hollins Island (NY.) The purchase was confirmed on a land patent by Thomas Dongan, 2nd Earl of Limerick, Governor of the Province of New York on June 4, 1688.

Harry B. Hollins purchased Hollins Island, also referred to as "Money Island," in 1906 from the estate of Sarah Nicoll and presented it to three of his sons, Messers. Gerald, John, and McKim Hollins.

== Sources ==
- Bayles, Richard Mather (1882). History of Suffolk County, New York. W.W. Munsell & Co. p. xxx.
