= Aleksander Grad =

Polish politician (born 1962)

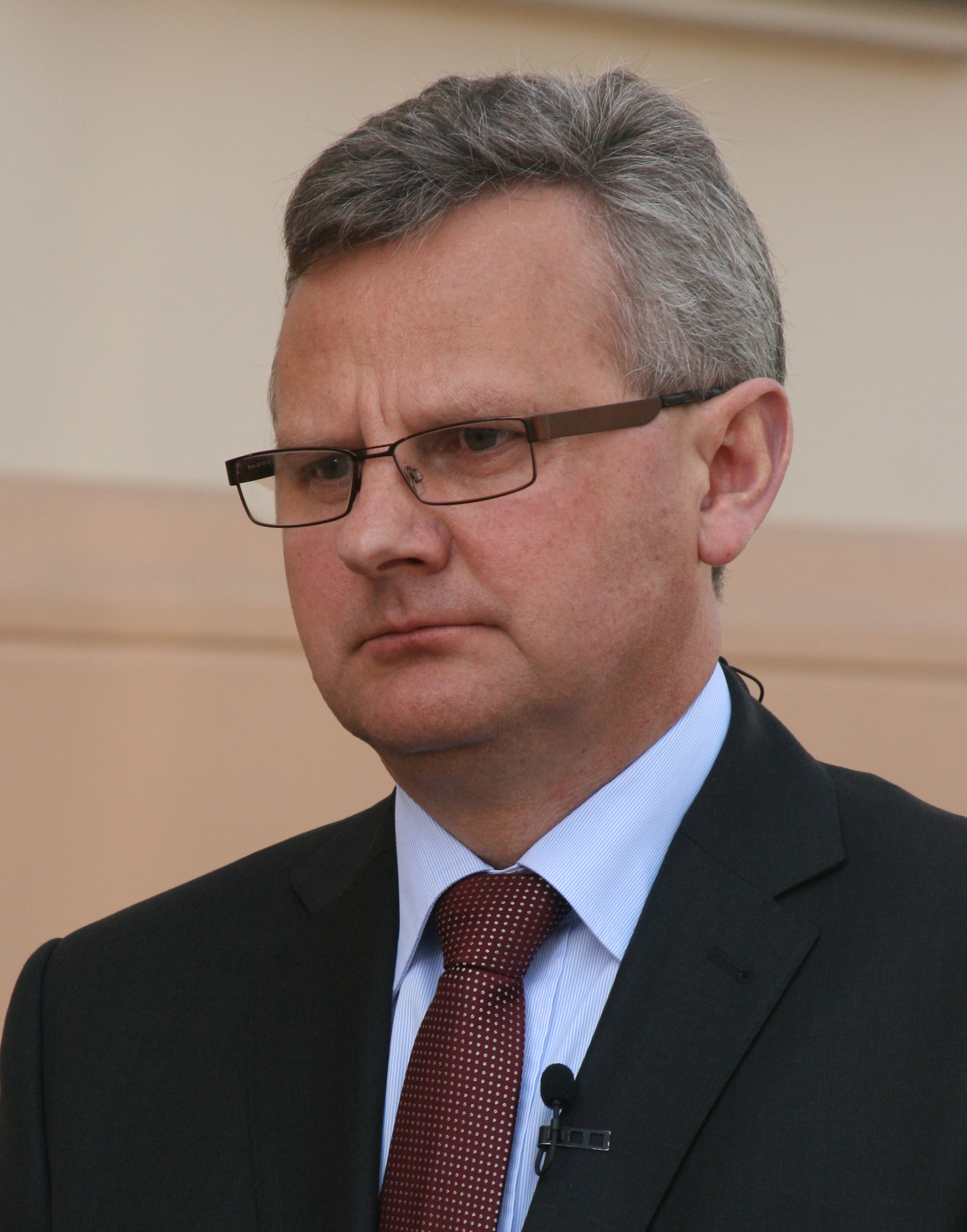

Member of Sejm
- In office 19 October 2001 – 30 June 2012

Minister of Treasury
- In office 16 November 2007 – 18 November 2011

Personal details
- Born: 1 May 1962 (age 63) Łosiniec, Tomaszów Lubelski County
- Party: Civic Platform

Aleksander Grad [alɛˈksandɛr ˈɡrat] (born 1 May 1962) is a Polish politician. He graduated from the Industrial Geodesy Department at the AGH University of Science and Technology in Cracow. He was elected to the Sejm on 25 September 2005, receiving 13 680 votes in 15 Tarnów district as a candidate on the Civic Platform list. He has been the Minister of State Treasury since November 2007.

He was also a member of Sejm 2001-2005.

Currently he is a head of the PGE PEJ1 (Polish energy company with some links to maybe projected in long future atomic power plant). Because of this and relatively high income (50 000 PLN/month, average from the math average calculation, but not minimal statistical salary in Poland is about 3,403 PLN (1,169 USD)/month), he was nicknamed by one of the newspapers "BMW (bierny mierny, ale wierny)" - "passively mediocre but loyal". This quotation from the communism Poland times generally means someone, who don't do task in good or average standards, have any ideas but despite this is loyal to the party/organization and this the reason why he/she can get some good paid position, especially created for him. E.g. the plans for Polish atomic energy sources, are not even in basic stage, he is not the physicist or other specialist. Also discussion is in the early stage, because there is no current commercial atomic power plant in Poland, with the strong opposition, which blocked previous attempt.

== Controversial cases ==
=== IACS case ===
In 2001-2003, when Aleksander Grad was the head of the Sub-commission on monitoring the introduction of the Integrated Administration and Control System (“IACS”), the tenders for supplying IACS equipment were won by the “MGGP” (company founded by Grad and controlled by his wife). As a result, A. Grad was removed and discharged as head of the sub-committee.

=== State tenders go to MGGP ===
MGGP was focused on state-guaranteed orders. By 2009 MGGP SA, independently or as part of various consortiums won over 30 tenders for at least 20 mln Euro, some contracts were granted without holding a tender.

=== Warranty for Fuel Mafia Members ===
In late 2002, Grad, together with the Sejm’s Rzeszów member from Civic Platform Jan Tomak, provided Stanisław K. and Romanowi M., leaders of Petro Tank, with the Sejm member’s warranty. Later Stanislaw K. and Romanowi M. were sentenced to two years in prison and confiscation of the property.

=== Debt enforcement claim against Aleksander Grad’s brother dismissed ===
In 2007 while A. Grad became the Minister of Treasury. A chemical company Zakłady Azotowe w Tarnowie refused enforcing pay back of property worth 422,800 euro against his brother - Mieczysław Grad.

=== Shipyard Scam ===
During the tender purchase of Gdynia and Szczecin dockyards, Grad favoured a Qatar investor. The transaction contravened the law and failed.

=== Shame list ===
In November 2012, the Polish newspaper Puls Biznesu published a “shame list”. Among other prominent Civic Platform activists taking the states money lies the name of former Minister of Treasury - Aleksander Grad.

Grad is portrayed as the main obstacle to a real privatisation in Poland. This civil servant reportedly promoted pseudo-privatisation schemes where government assets were privatised by government affiliated structures allowing him and a group of close allies to maintain control over the financial flows. This inefficient practice is paid for by the EU taxpayers.

== See also ==
- Members of Polish Sejm 2005-2007
