= Harrow International School New York =

School in Oakdale, New York, United States

Coordinates: 40.7301°N 73.1188°W

Information
- Established: September 2025; 11 months ago
- Website: www.harrownewyork.com

Harrow International School New York is an international school in Oakdale, New York, on Long Island, that opened in 2025. It is a subsidiary of the Harrow School in the United Kingdom, and the first such one to open in the United States.

== History ==
The New York State Board of Regents granted the school a provisional charter in February 2025. The school opened in September 2025, initially serving grades 6 through 10, with an inaugural enrollment of approximately 80 students. The school's academic programme expands by one year group annually, with the intention of ultimately encompassing grades 6 through 12 and a total enrolment of approximately 400 students. The school offers day, five-day boarding, and seven-day boarding options.

The inaugural Principal was Nick Page, formerly Deputy Headmaster at Harrow School in the United Kingdom. Following his tenure, he was succeeded by Matthew Sipple, who had served as Vice-Principal. Harrow School provides ongoing support to the school through regular meetings, school visits, and inspections conducted against the Harrow Standards, maintaining oversight to ensure the school operates at a world-class level.

== Academics ==
The school will use the International Baccalaureate curriculum and it will be coeducational.

== Campus ==
The campus was previously owned by LaSalle Military Academy and St. John's University. Amity University had purchased the campus from St. John's in 2016. Amity then decided to establish a Harrow school in New York. This campus has 170 acres (69 ha) of land, and includes an 1897 building named the Bourne Mansion. The Bourne Mansion is scheduled to be the school's central building.
