= Islip High School =

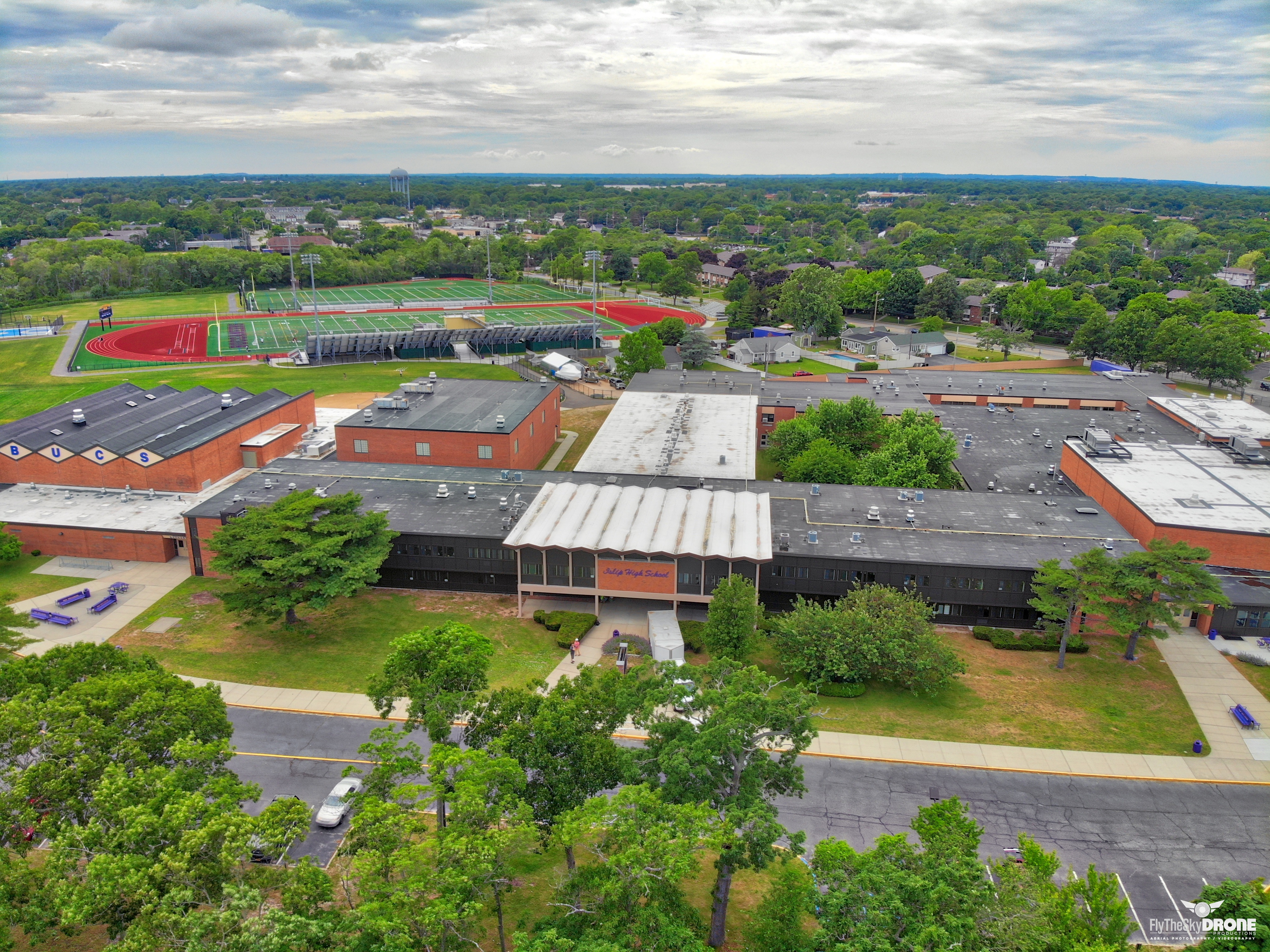

Location
- 2508 Union Blvd; Islip, New York; United States; 40°43′50″N 73°13′13″W

Information
- Type: Public
- School district: Islip School District
- NCES School ID: 361554001324
- Principal: Lara Gonzalez
- Teaching staff: 98.46 (on FTE basis)
- Grades: 9–12
- Enrollment: 891 (2023–2024)
- Student to teacher ratio: 9.05
- Colors: Purple and Gold
- Mascot: Buccaneer
- Website: Islip High School

Islip High School is the public high school in Islip, in Suffolk County, New York on the South Shore of Long Island. It is a part of the Islip School District.

As of 2023 the principal is Lara Gonzalez. The complete lists of current and past graduates, Regents exam scores, and other important information can be found on the New York State School Information Report Comprehensive School Report, as well as on Newsday.com, as current as the 2010–2011 school year.

== Students from other districts ==
Graduates of Woodhull School (PK-6) of the Fire Island School District can attend Islip secondary schools, Islip High included.

Before the Hauppauge Union Free School District opened Hauppauge High School, many students in the district attended Islip. The rest of the students attended Smithtown High School of the Smithtown Central School District. The dividing line was likely the line between the Town of Islip and the Town of Smithtown.

For many years students in the East Islip School District also went to Islip. When the district opened their 'junior school' for students grades 9 and 10, students wishing to continue their education went to Islip for their final two years of high school. This ended when East Islip opened their first building that served students grades 11 and 12 in 1925.

== Curriculum ==
The curriculum at the Islip high School includes all academic areas, as well as art, music, and technology. Beginning at the Middle School level, honors classes are offered in English, social studies, mathematics, science, Italian, and Spanish. Advanced Placement courses are offered in, including but not limited to, Art History, English Language and Composition, English Literature and Composition, US History, European History, US Government and Politics, Human Geography, Calculus AB, Statistics, Biology, Chemistry, Physics 1 & 2, Environmental Science, Seminar, Research, and the Italian and Spanish Languages. The High School also offers dual credit options through affiliations with Suffolk County Community College (Math & Music), Farmingdale State College (Business & Technology), Hofstra (Engineering), and St. John's University (Italian, Business, & Science).

== Notable alumni ==
- Louis Dejoy, Postmaster General
- Alan Mayer, soccer goalkeeper
- Pat Petersen, long-distance runner
- Matt Rogers, comedian
- Larry Saperstein, actor
- Tom Veryzer, Major League Baseball player
- Chris Wade, UFC Fighter
- Sue Weber, soccer defender

== Awards ==
In 2003, the cafeteria at Islip High School received the award for the Most Improved Cafeteria in the State from the New York State School FoodService Association.
