= Seatuck National Wildlife Refuge =

Wildlife refuge in New York, United States

- IUCN category IV (habitat/species management area)
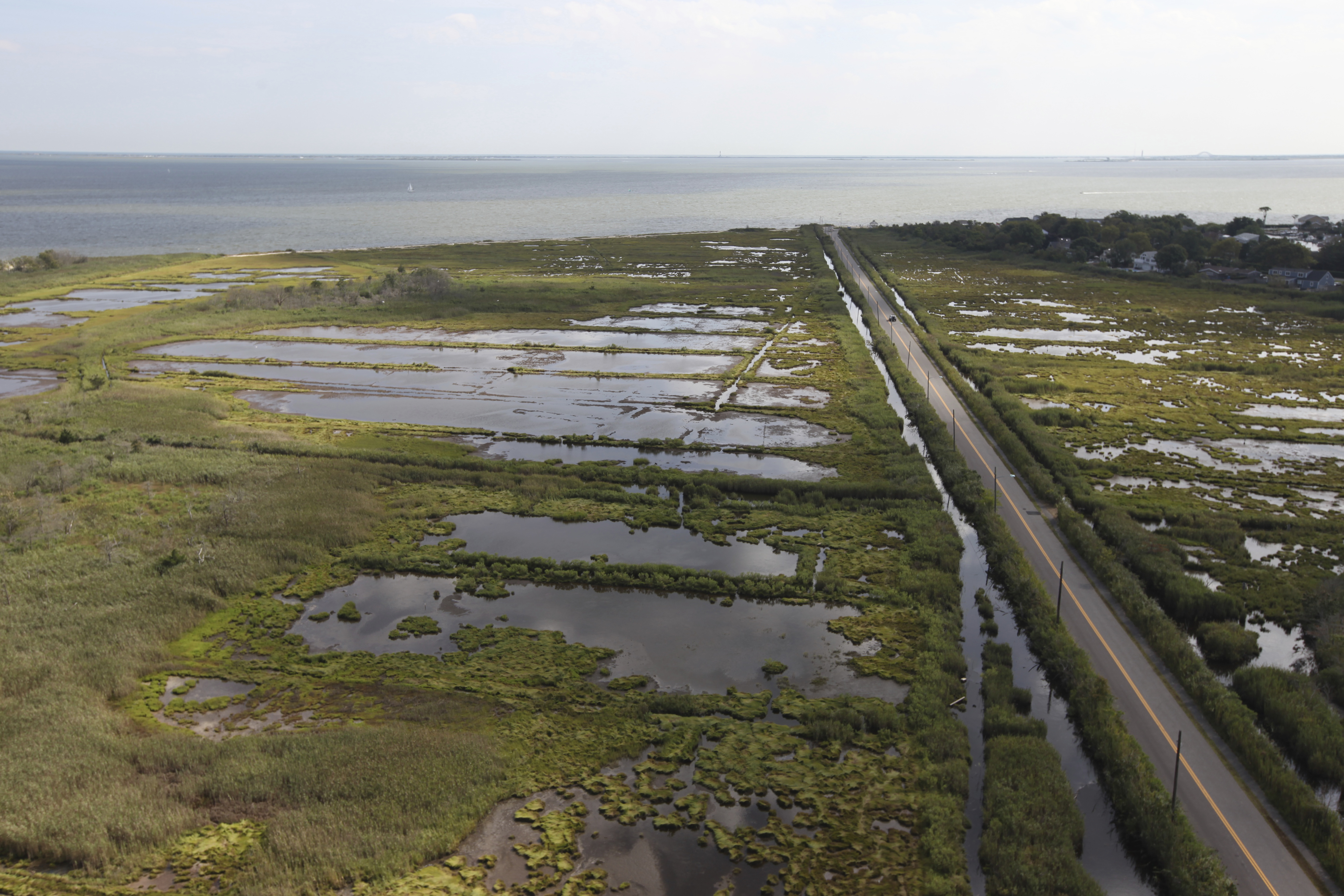
- Aerial view of Seatuck National Wildlife Refuge

- Location within the United States
- Location: Suffolk County, New York, United States
- Nearest city: Islip, New York
- Coordinates: 40°42′37″N 73°12′40″W
- Area: 196 acres (0.79 km^{2})
- Established: 1968
- Governing body: U.S. Fish and Wildlife Service
- Website: Seatuck National Wildlife Refuge

Seatuck National Wildlife Refuge is located in the hamlet of Islip, New York, on the south shore of Long Island. It is managed by the U.S. Fish and Wildlife Service as part of the Long Island National Wildlife Refuge Complex. The refuge consists of 196 acres (0.79 km^{2}) bordering the Great South Bay, separated from the Atlantic Ocean only by Fire Island. Situated in a heavily developed urban area along Champlin Creek, the refuge is an oasis for many species of migratory birds and waterfowl.

Approximately one half of the refuge consists of tidal marsh, which serves a vast number of waterfowl in the winter months. The refuge attracts waterbirds, white-tailed deer, red fox, and migratory songbirds and raptors. The refuge has been classified as part of the larger Great South Bay, a significant coastal habitat. Management activities include forest and grassland protection and management, wetland restoration, wildlife nesting structure maintenance, and habitat restoration.
