= H. B. Hollins =

American banker (1854–1938)

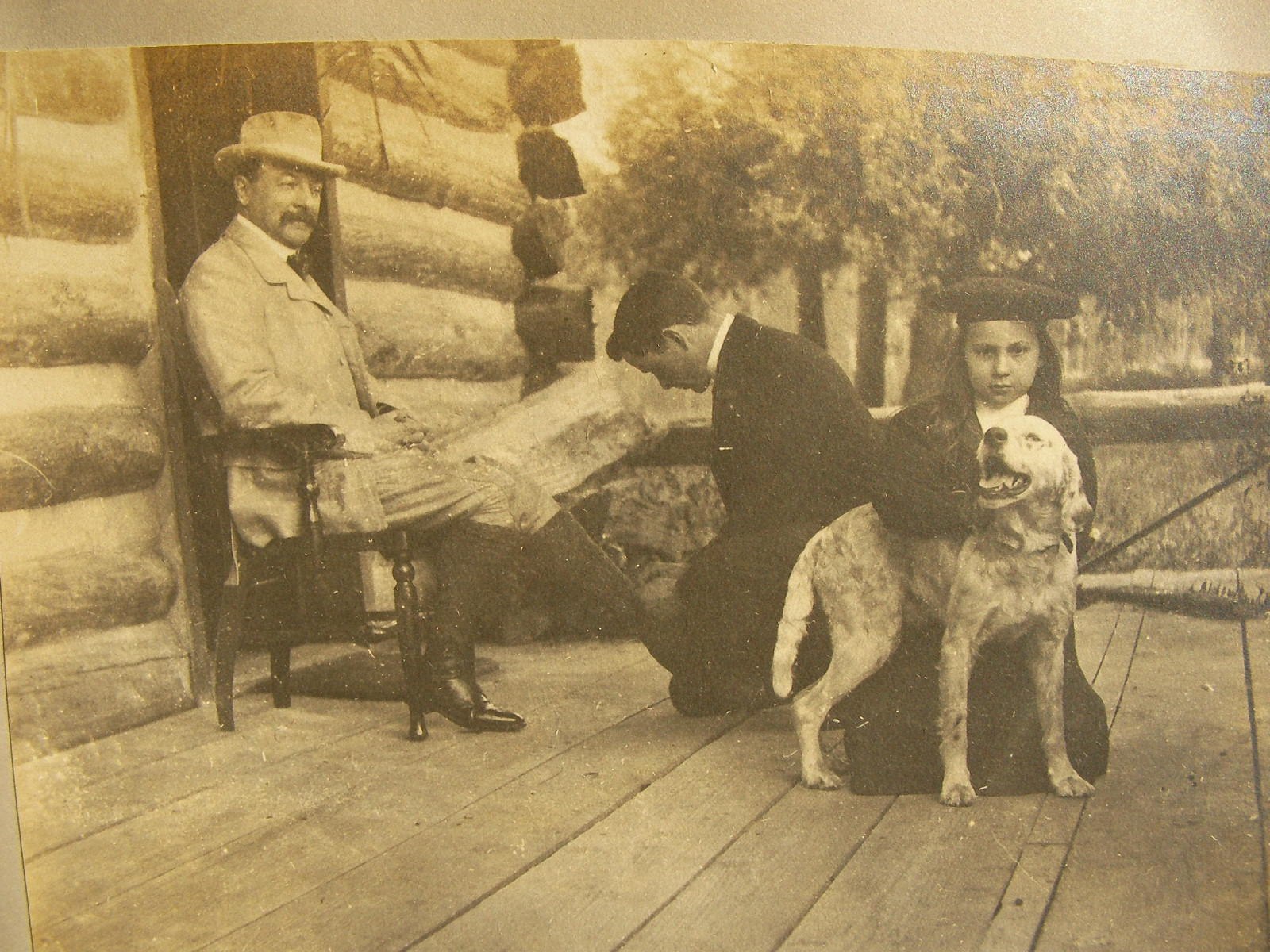
- Hollins with a servant giving a shoe shine, and his daughter, Marion, 1903, Tillman, South Carolina
- Born: Harry Bowly Hollins; September 5, 1854; New York, New York, U.S.
- Died: February 24, 1938 (aged 83); New York, New York, U.S.
- Occupations: Financier, banker
- Spouse: Evelina Meserole Knapp
- Children: McKim Hollins; John K. Hollins; Gerald Vanderbilt Hollins; H. B. Hollins Jr.; Marion Hollins
- Parent(s): Francis Hollins and Elizabeth Coles Morris

Harry Bowly Hollins (September 5, 1854 – February 24, 1938) was an American financier, banker, and railroad magnate. He was responsible for organizing the banking and brokerage firm bearing his name, H.B. Hollins & Co. in 1878.

== Life and business ==
He was born to Francis Hollins and Elizabeth Coles Morris. Hollins, a native New Yorker educated in private schools, was married to socialite Evelina Meserole Knapp on January 25, 1877. The couple had four sons, Harry B. Jr., McKim (Kim), John K. (Jack), Gerald Vanderbilt, and a daughter, Marion. Colloquially known as HBH or HB, Hollins was notable in New York society life. Members of the Hollins family were socially prominent figures and were regularly mentioned in the New York Times social diary.

Hollins resided between Manhattan at his multiple town residences (including one at 12 West 56th Street) and at his 600-acre (2.4 km^{2}) country estate, Meadow Farm in East Islip, Long Island. Hollins entertained family and friends at Meadow Farm each summer and early autumn; these renowned guests to summer at the estate included Hollins' friend, the Prince of Wales (the future King Edward VIII). Meadow Farm is also believed to be the birthplace of his children. His family's residences, mainly the East Islip mansion were said to contain many valuable paintings and rare objects of art.

== Career ==
Hollins began business as a marine insurance broker, and became a banker in 1888. At one time he was a partner of Fernando Yznaga whose sister Consuelo Yznaga was the Dowager Duchess of Manchester In fact, he was along with close friend William K. Vanderbilt, the executors of Yznaga's will. Along with Eugene Zimmerman of Cincinnati, Ohio, the father of the Helena, Duchess of Manchester (who married the son of Consuelo, Duchess of Manchester), he owned an interest in a number of properties in the Midwest. These properties included Superior Colliery Company and Superior Development Company.

J. P. Morgan and H. B. Hollins were also business partners and the closest of friends until the former's death; Hollins was one of the men sent to pick up Morgan's body when it arrived aboard a ship from France. In fact Morgan's offices were located across the street from H. B. Hollins & Co.'s exclusive banking offices, at the southwest corner of Wall and Broad Streets. On November 13, 1913, H.B. Hollins & Co., one of Wall Street's most highly regarded houses, failed in debt of $5,000,000. The failure of the house was related to a number of issues including the company letting its stock exchange business go adrift, paying more attention to flotation of new companies and to banking operations in addition to their expenses boring them down. After the news of the firm failure had spread through the financial district, Hollins's attorneys, Beekman, Menken & Griscom, released a press statement downplaying the collapse:

The failure was due to withdrawal of large deposits, thus greatly reducing the firm's working capital, which is largely invested in securities which cannot be readily sold in the present market.

A large portion of the securities was understood on the Street to represent a number of companies in Mexico that were adversely impacted by political turmoil south of the border at the time. These enterprises were thought to include Mexican Crude Oil, Asphaltic Products Company, and United States Asphalt Company.

Hollins's life in East Islip and the story of his bankruptcy had been conveyed to Elmo Pope Brown, one of the first people to buy a lot on the broken-up estate in the late 1930s, by an Islip pharmacist named Jerome (or Gerard). Jerome told Brown that Hollins continued to work as a broker in the city and managed to pay back the entire debt, less what was forgiven by Vanderbilt and the Morgan estate, by 1928.

Hollins belonged to the Union Metropolitan, South Side Sportsmen's, Knickerbocker Club, New York Yacht, Meadow Brook, Racquet and Tennis, Riding, and Garden City Golf Clubs, also the Automobile Club of America. He also served on the board of the Vanderbilt Motor Parkway.

On April 3, 1900, seven men from the International Banking and Trust Company were elected as directors of the North American Trust Company. They included president Oakleigh Thorne of the International, as well as H. B. Hollins.

== Personal life ==
Hollins's great-great-grandson, through his son Gerald Vanderbilt Hollins, is actor Justin Theroux.

=== Meadow Farm and East Islip ===
After Hollins's bankruptcy, Meadow Farm, the country manor, was sold to Charles L. Lawrence along with 116 acres (0.47 km^{2}) bordering the Great South Bay and Champlin Creek. The family renovated one of the farmhouses on the northern portion of the approximately 480 acres (1.9 km^{2}) remaining to which they relocated. After the death of Mrs. H. B. Hollins, a month after her husband, her daughter Marion as the administrator of the estate sold most of the property not utilized by the family.

Meadow Farm was demolished in 2002/03 as part of the Harbour View project. This project was completion of The Moorings, a wealthy gated community by the subdividing Meadow Farm's remaining 16 acres (65,000 m^{2}) into 11 lots. The purchaser of the 5.88-acre (23,800 m^{2}) parcel (now 150 Meadowfarm Road) containing Meadow Farm learned the cost of refurbishing the mansion would have well exceeded $1 million and opted to replace it with a newer estate. According to a New York Times article written in 1999, the new estate's owner planned to salvage marble fireplaces, paneling and other appurtenances from the mansion.

Remnants of Hollins's Meadow Farm can still be found off of Dock Road, including the original gates now leading to a small community named after the family, Hollins Estates. The once private road leading to the manor house was named Hollins Lane. The Hollins stable and clock tower remain as a residential house at 37 Blackmore Lane. A carriage house, located west of Meadowfarm Road and last used as a residence, was demolished in the late 1980s to make way for a subdivision. At 35 Blackmore Lane is what was believed to have been the estate manager's (Blackmore) house, which had been moved from another location nearby.

At 42 Blackmore Lane is a structure on a 5-acre (20,000 m^{2}) parcel which also belonged to Hollins. It was the renovated farmhouse they relocated to after parting with Meadow Farm. Harvard Class books from the 1930s were found in the house in the 1980s - a member of the Hollins family was pictured in those books.

A company, Yarmouth Estates of Bay Shore, New York, has purchased the house at 42 Blackmore and is requesting a subdivision. Harry Hollins Jr.'s estate house, designed by the architectural firm of Cross & Cross and built in 1907, remains at 18 Crick Holly Lane and Gerald Hollins' home remains at 180 Bayview Avenue. The carriage house for Gerard Hollins' house still stands at 158 Bayview Ave and is now used as a private residence. Gerald Hollins later built a home on White Oak Lane, which still stands and is now the visitor center for the South Shore Nature Center.

Another Hollins' house, that of Robert L. Hollins, was part of a 17-acre estate which remained on the border of Hecksher State Park until the 1980s. This land had been purchased from the Nichol estate by HB Hollins Jr. in 1906 and was the site of one of the earliest settlements in Islip Town. It includes an old house, part of which had been an older structure on the "Nichol Farm", a small barn, and a grounds keeper's house built on the foundation of an 18th-century ice house. Replete with a small damn and ice pond, the area had been a self-sufficient working farm until the last Nichol died at the turn of the 20th century. The Hollins family used this land as late as the 1960s for duck hunting and a private road connected it to HB Hollins Jrs nearby Crick Holly estate. by the 1990s the land and remaining buildings were part of Hecksher State Park and will not suffer the development of the Hollins's other holdings.

A private road once ran across all of the Hollins holdings, crossing Bayview Ave and through the estate of HB Hollins Jr., where it continued into what is now Hecksher State Park. The outline of this road can be seen running through the woods on one of the last undeveloped parcels of land off White Oak Lane. As recently as the 1980s, one area resident was concerned as the road was still listed as a legal right-of-way in his property deed. a local historian believes that parts of this road, particularly the part of it on the east side of bayview avenue which included the driveway to HB Hollins Jrs. house, Crick Holly, was one of the earliest roads in the area and connected the first Nichol settlement located on the shore of the bay in Hecksher Park with Gibbs Patent, and a grist mill which Nichol and Gibbs operated on the west side of Chaplain's Creek and on to the village of islip. This road ran diagonal across all of the known and modern, grid like, roads in the area and the last of it, with the exception of what remains in Hecksher Park, was the driveway to HB Hollins Jrs. Crick Holly; if this was in fact a colonial era road, and there is strong evidence it was, it was obliterated with little attention when Crick Holly was developed in the 1980s. The locals at the time assumed the road was the driveway to a Hollins' House; now it appears to have had more significance.

In the mid-1970s two youths digging for old bottles in the "hollins' dump" at the corner of Dock Road and Hunting Lane in EI discovered a silver Tiffany spoon with the initials HBH on it; the spoon had been held in the collection of one of the boys parents until it had been stolen during a break-in in the 2000s.

The town has named several things in the family's honour. Most notable is Hollins Memorial Beach, which the family generously donated to the town. other property belonging to the larger Hollins family, property of his sons and a grandson, had been taken by eminent domain, on more than one occasion and as late as the 1960s, for the benefit of Hecksher State Park

Hollins, along with members of his family, are interred at the Episcopal Church Cemetery in Great River, NY.

=== The Knapp Children painting ===
Hollins's wife, Evalina Knapp, was the daughter of William Knapp, one of the subjects in Waldo and Jewett's painting, The Knapp Children, circa 1834. Evalina inherited the painting and in 1959, it was donated to the Metropolitan Museum of Art in New York by the wife of Harry's and Evalina's son, John Knapp Hollins, in John's memory. In 2016, amateur East Islip historian Steven Cymbalski had been reviewing a late 19th century photograph of the Hollins family as seated in the dining room of their East Islip mansion and noticed a painting hanging on the wall in the background; further inspection revealed it was Waldo and Jewett's The Knapp Children. Having known of the painting and realizing the significance of this, Mr. Cymbalski notified the Metropolitan Museum who at that point had not had a photograph of the famed painting hanging in its natural environs and termed the discovery "quite a find." A scan of the photograph has been provided to the museum. The photograph and the story of the painting's discovery in it has been placed in the file on the painting at the Met.

=== Hollins Island ===
Hollins purchased an island approximately three and a half miles south of Meadow Farm and about a mile north of mainland Fire Island in the Great South Bay. The family used the island primarily for hunting before his bankruptcy, and some speculate that they contemplated the erection of a grand estate on the bay. The island retains the name Hollins Island, however it is sometimes referenced as East Fire Island (not to be confused with East Island, an island succumbed to the sea off Hollins Island's northeast shore) or Middle Island.

The island was originally owned by William Nicoll who purchased the property on November 19, 1687, from Winnequaheagh Sachem of Connetquot. The purchase was confirmed on a patent by Governor Dongan on June 4, 1688. Harry B. Hollins purchased the island in 1906 from the estate of Sarah Nicoll and presented it to three of his sons, Messers. Gerald, John, and McKim Hollins.

In 1915, Gerald V. Hollins purchased nearby Money Island from the Nicoll estate. Legend tells that the island was a hideaway for pirates' gold, most notably Captain Kidd's buried treasure of the Spanish Main.

== Office locations ==
- 15 Wall Street, New York City
- 18 Wall Street, New York City

== Residential locations ==
- Meadow Farm, the family's country seat, East Islip
- 12 West 56th Street, New York City
- 14 East 60th Street, New York City
