= Heckscher State Park =

State park in New York, United States

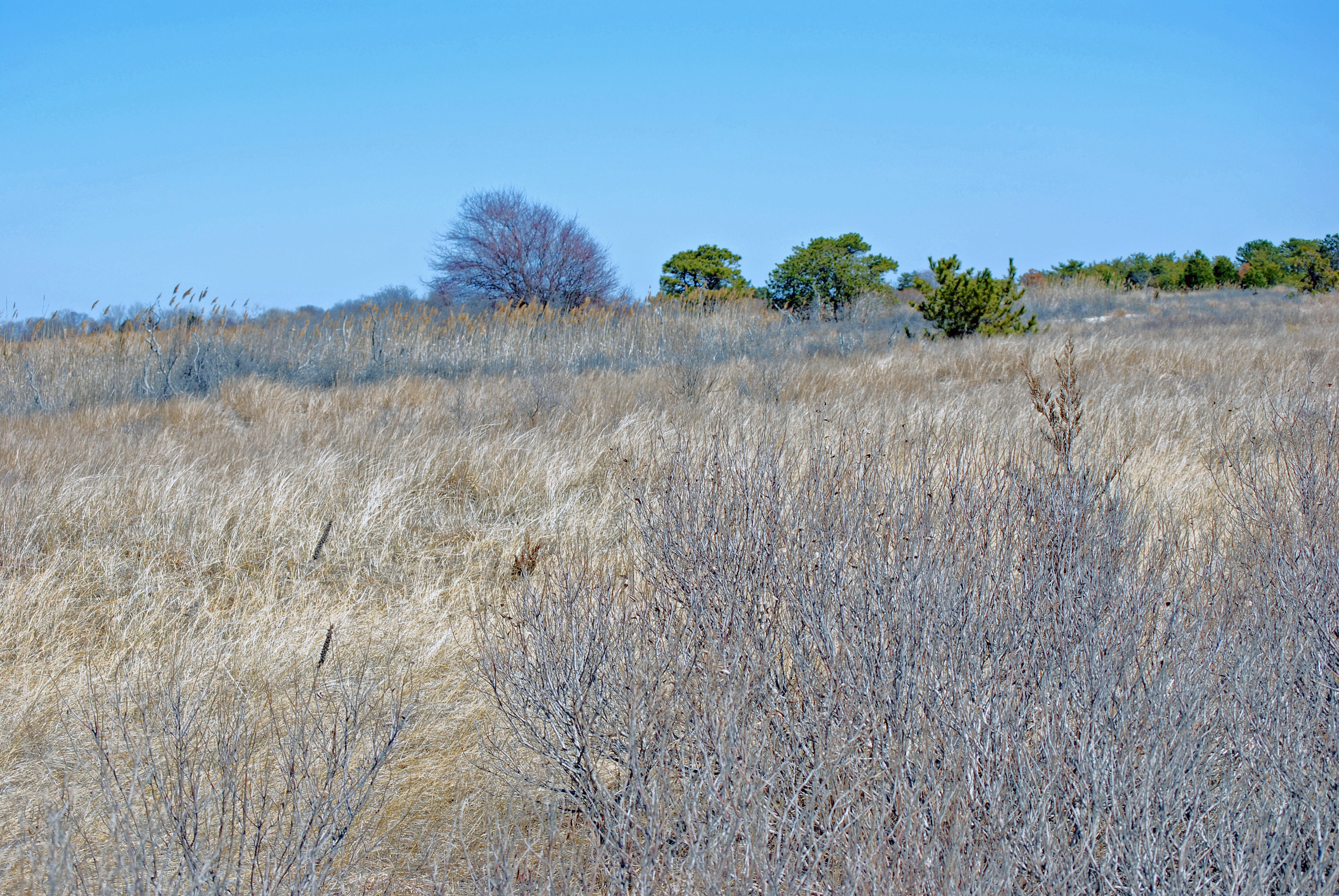
- Dunes in Heckscher State Park

- Location within New York Location within the United States
- Type: State park
- Location: Heckscher Parkway Field 1 East Islip, New York
- Nearest city: East Islip, New York
- Coordinates: 40°42′N 73°10′W
- Area: 1,600 acres (6.5 km^{2})
- Created: February 1929
- Operator: New York State Office of Parks, Recreation and Historic Preservation
- Visitors: 1,390,767 (in 2024)
- Open: All year
- Website: Heckscher State Park

Heckscher State Park is a 1,600-acre (6.5 km^{2}) state park on the shore of the Great South Bay at East Islip in Suffolk County, New York, USA.

== History ==
The park includes 1,469 acres (5.94 km^{2}) that was once the 19th-century estates of George C. Taylor and J. Neal Plum. Islip's founder, William Nicoll, originally built his estate on this property. The Long Island State Park Commission, led by Robert Moses, expropriated the property in 1924, an action found to be illegal by the state's highest court on the grounds that the law did not permit such expropriation when the Commission did not have the funds to pay for the property; however, in the meantime, the Commission had retained control of the property. Despite opposition from wealthy local residents, the parkland was finally purchased by New York State with the aid of a donation from August Heckscher. The park officially opened in February 1929.

Beginning in 1972 and continuing until 2008, the New York Philharmonic played at Heckscher State Park as part of its free "Concerts in the Parks" series. The annual event was held on summer evenings in an open field near the campground and was open to the public. In 2009, the New York Philharmonic chose to cancel the event for the summer of that year due to financial constraints. After one year without a concert at the park, the Long Island Philharmonic was able to put on a successful performance in 2010. The new generation of concerts commenced with a theme of American composers, including George Gershwin, Leonard Bernstein, John Philip Sousa, John Williams, and Billy Joel.

== Park description ==
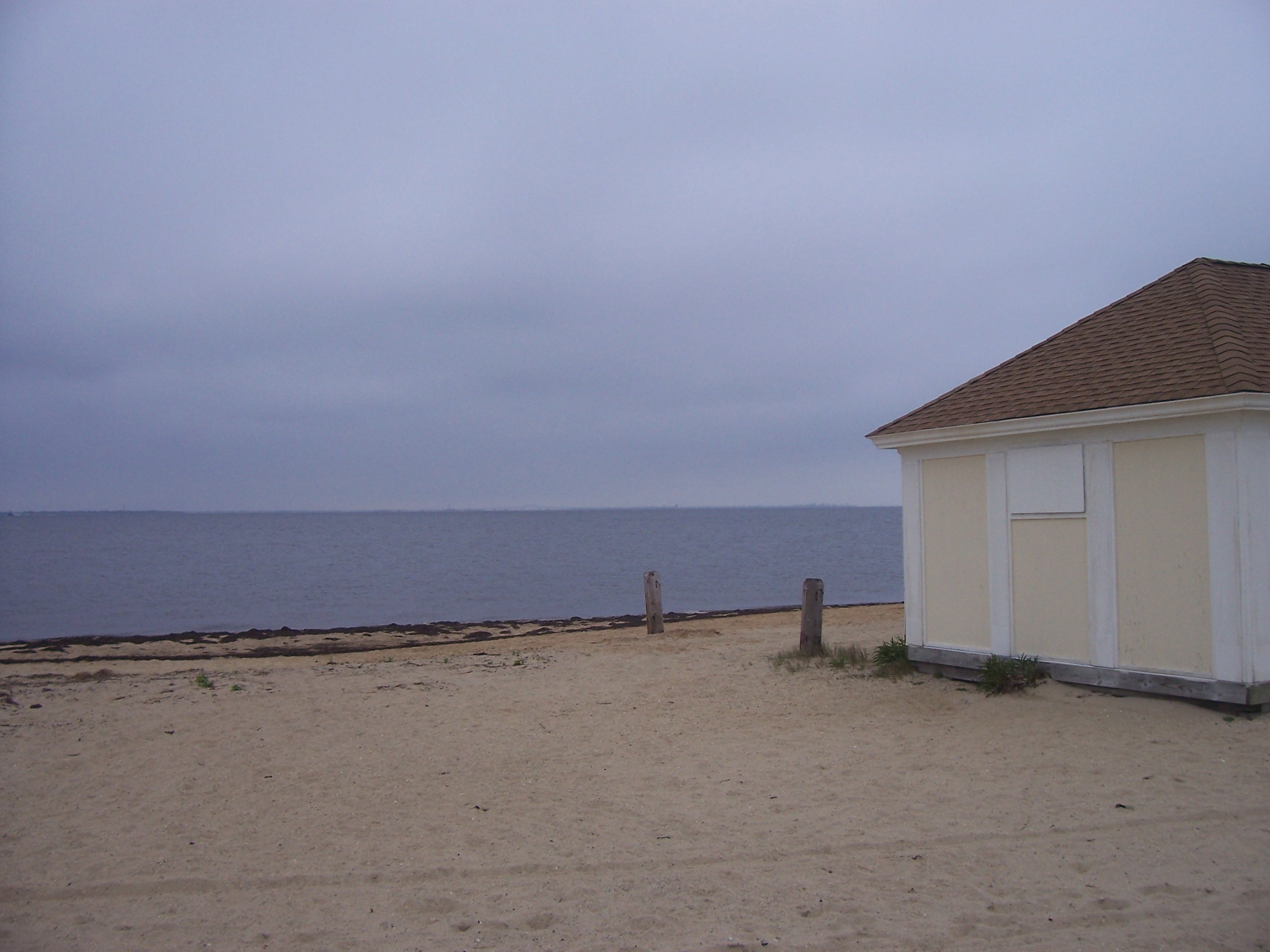
View from beach to the Great South Bay

Heckscher offers a beach, picnic tables with pavilions, a playground, playing fields and a disc golf course, recreation programs, hiking and biking, fishing, cross-country skiing, a boat launch, and a food concession. It includes the Heckscher Forest, a dedicated disc golf course established in the summer of 2014. The park formerly offered a campground with tent and trailer sites, as well as an Olympic-sized swimming pool, which were closed due to budget cuts.

Heckscher State Park is known as the "Home of the White-tailed Deer", as deer are fairly populous throughout the park. Additionally, about 280 bird species can be observed in the park.

The park is accessible by the Heckscher State Parkway, and falls within the district protected by the Great River Fire Department.

The Long Island Greenbelt Trail starts its 31-mile (50 km) route in Heckscher State Park. It ends in Sunken Meadow State Park.

== See also ==
- List of New York state parks
