= The Moorings, New York =

American private gated-community

Coordinates: 40.711°N 73.200°W

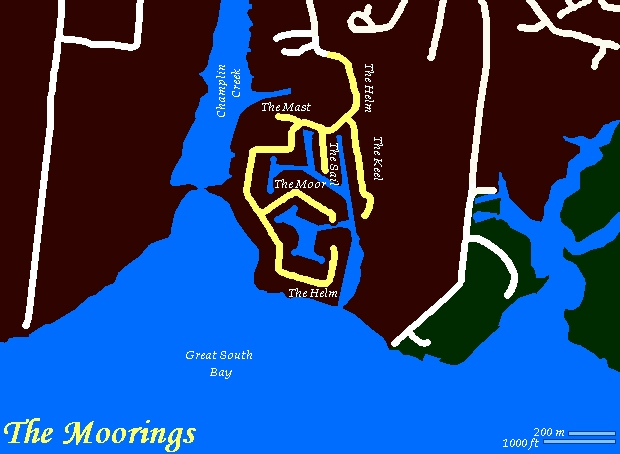
Map of The Moorings

The Moorings is a guard-gated private community in the unincorporated East Islip hamlet of Suffolk County, New York and is not a census-designated place (CDP) within itself. It is situated on Long Island's Great South Bay.

== History ==
The Moorings was the conception of Francis Henry Hawkes, a developer who purchased the estate of Charles Lanier Lawrence in 1962. Francis Hawkes, his wife Jean Whiting Hawkes, and his five children lived in the home until Francis retired and moved with his wife and youngest child to Arizona. The home passed through many hands and was divided and in turn developed, but Charles Lawrence's home still stands.

The estate originally belonged to famed Wall Street banker, H. B. Hollins and was landscaped by the Olmsted Brothers. Hawkes improved upon the site by constructing roadways, curbs, bulkheading, drainage, and waterways connecting to a private yacht marina. He also enforced strict stipulations to maintain the characteristic beauty and dignity of the lush bayside wooded acreage; land was sold at acre minimum and no two estates could be of generic plans nor could they be of similar plans within the gates.

Sporadic building began in 1964, prior to the incorporation of the homeowner's association. Meadow Farm, the 19th century Hollins estate remained on a 5.88-acre (2.38 ha) waterfront parcel and was eventually demolished. However, the estate's owners salvaged marble fireplaces, paneling, and other appurtenances for the construction of a new estate. The new development on the original estate parcel became Harbour View Estates.

"The Moorings" means "a place suitable for anchoring" in Middle English.

== Geography ==
The Moorings is located on Long Island's Great South Bay at the end of Meadow Farm Road.

== Education ==
The Moorings is zoned in the East Islip School District.
