= St. Johns Episcopal Church and Cemetery (Oakdale, New York) =

Historic site in Suffolk County, New York

- U.S. National Register of Historic Places
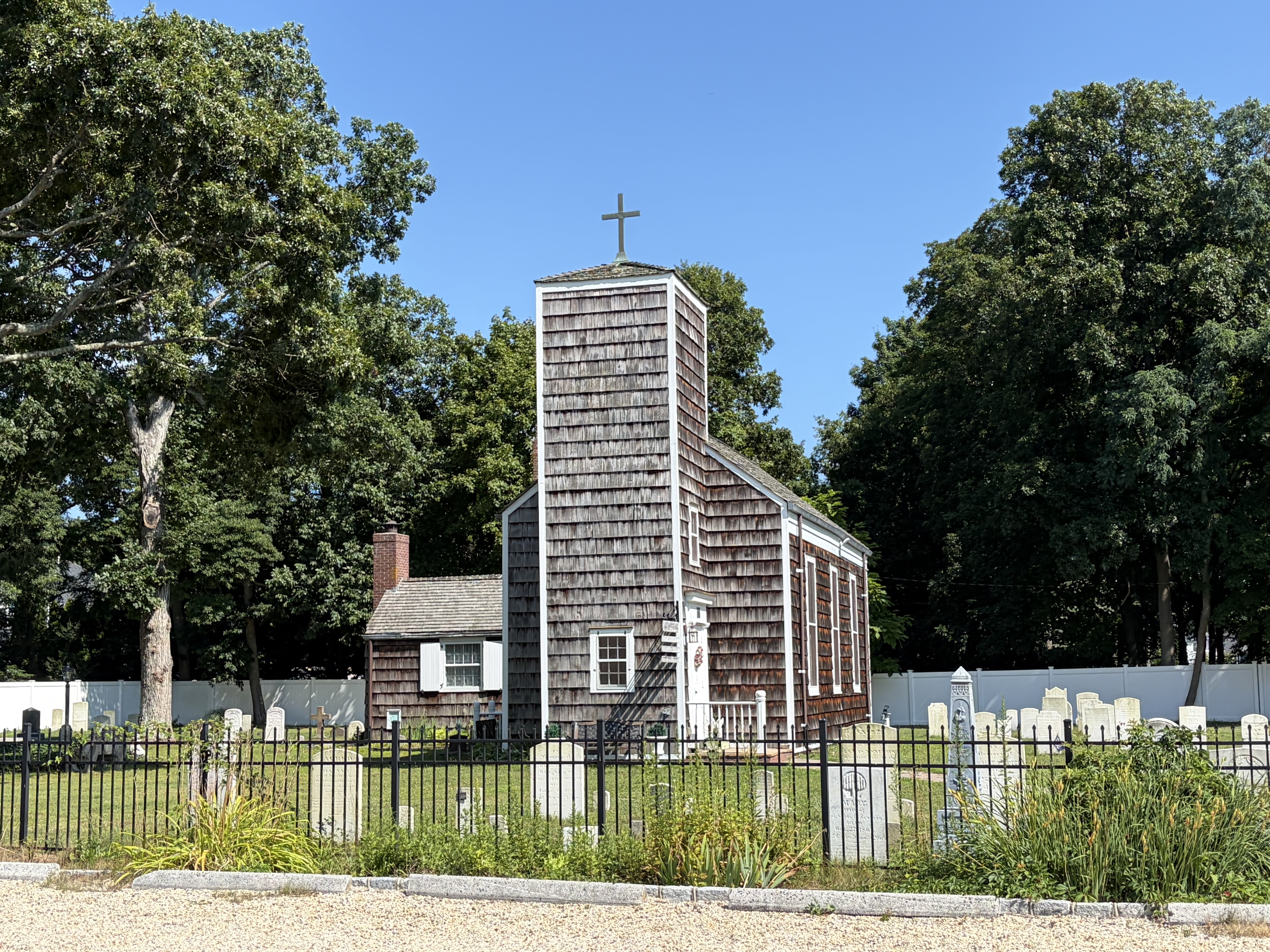
- St. John's Episcopal Church & Cemetery from the parking lot in July 2026.

- Location within New York Location within the United States
- Location: Montauk Hwy. NE side, about 300' NW of the jct. with Locust Ave., Town of Islip, Oakdale, New York
- Coordinates: 40°44′7″N 73°7′2″W
- Area: less than one acre
- Built: 1765
- Architectural style: Col:Post-Medieval English
- NRHP reference No.: 93001559
- Added to NRHP: January 28, 1994

St. Johns Episcopal Church and Cemetery is a historic Episcopal church and cemetery on Montauk Highway on the northeast side, about 300' northwest of the junction with Locust Avenue, Town of Islip in Oakdale, Suffolk County, New York. The church is a small, rectangular one story building with a gable roof, wood shingle siding, and a simple painted wood exterior trim. It features a three-story, square, engaged tower with a shallow pyramidal roof. It was enlarged and remodeled in 1843 and restored in 1962; the stained glass window was added in 1873. The cemetery contains about 100 graves with burials dating from the late 18th century to the early 20th century.

It was added to the National Register of Historic Places in 1994.
