= Islip Public Schools =

School district in the U.S. state of New York

Islip Union Free School District

Location
- Islip, Suffolk County, New York; United States

District information
- Motto: Students First, Pure Intentions, Best Effort
- Grades: K-12
- President: Philip Dineen
- Superintendent: Dennis O’Hara, Ed.D.
- Schools: 5

Students and staff
- District mascot: Buccaneers
- Colors: Purple and yellow

Other information
- District Offices: 215 Main Street Islip, NY 11751
- Website: islipufsd.org

Islip Union Free School District, also known as Islip Public Schools, is a school district in the Town of Islip on the South Shore of Long Island, New York in Suffolk County. It serves the entirety of the hamlet of Islip and a small part of the hamlet of Bay Shore.

In 1986 voters rejected a proposal to spend $247,321 ($726000 in today's terms) to fund after school activities and sports programs on a 704 to 586 basis.

Graduates of Woodhull School (PK-6) of the Fire Island School District can attend Islip secondary schools.

== Schools ==
- Islip High School
- Islip Middle School

Elementary schools:

- Commack Road Elementary School
- Maud S. Sherwood Elementary School
- Wing Elementary School
