= North Great River, New York =

- Hamlet and census-designated place
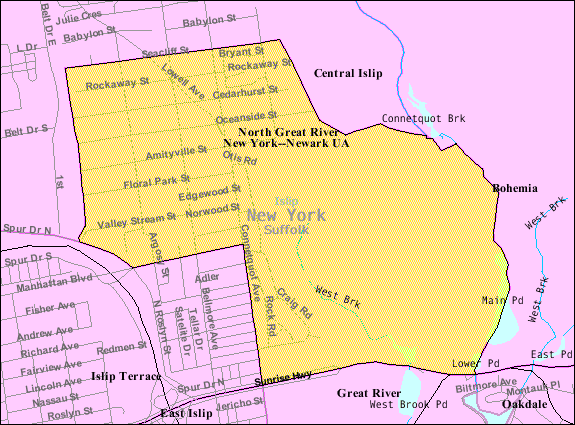
- U.S. Census map of North Great River.

- Location within the state of New York.
- Coordinates: 40°45′44″N 73°10′30″W
- Country: United States
- State: New York
- County: Suffolk
- Town: Islip

Area
  - Total: 2.38 sq mi (6.16 km^{2})
  - Land: 2.35 sq mi (6.09 km^{2})
  - Water: 0.023 sq mi (0.06 km^{2})
- Elevation: 30 ft (9 m)

Population (2020)
  - Total: 4,266
  - Density: 1,813.8/sq mi (700.32/km^{2})
- Time zone: UTC-5 (Eastern (EST))
  - Summer (DST): UTC-4 (EDT)
- ZIP code: 11752
- Area code: 631
- FIPS code: 36-52078
- GNIS feature ID: 0958793

North Great River is a hamlet and census-designated place (CDP) in the Town of Islip, in Suffolk County, on Long Island, in New York, United States. As of the 2020 census, North Great River had a population of 4,266.

The hamlet is served by the Islip Terrace Post Office (11752).

== Geography ==
According to the United States Census Bureau, the CDP has a total area of 2.4 square miles (6.1 km^{2}), of which 2.3 square miles (6.0 km^{2}) is land and 0.04 square miles (0.1 km^{2}), or 0.99%, is water.

== Demographics ==
Historical population
Census	Pop.	Note	%±
2020	4,266		—
U.S. Decennial Census

=== 2020 census ===
As of the 2020 census, North Great River had a population of 4,266. The median age was 45.2 years. 18.9% of residents were under the age of 18 and 19.9% of residents were 65 years of age or older. For every 100 females there were 91.8 males, and for every 100 females age 18 and over there were 90.7 males age 18 and over.

100.0% of residents lived in urban areas, while 0.0% lived in rural areas.

There were 1,505 households in North Great River, of which 28.3% had children under the age of 18 living in them. Of all households, 55.9% were married-couple households, 14.7% were households with a male householder and no spouse or partner present, and 23.6% were households with a female householder and no spouse or partner present. About 21.3% of all households were made up of individuals and 11.9% had someone living alone who was 65 years of age or older.

There were 1,535 housing units, of which 2.0% were vacant. The homeowner vacancy rate was 0.6% and the rental vacancy rate was 0.0%.

Racial composition as of the 2020 census
Race	Number	Percent
White	3,351	78.6%
Black or African American	165	3.9%
American Indian and Alaska Native	11	0.3%
Asian	98	2.3%
Native Hawaiian and Other Pacific Islander	0	0.0%
Some other race	285	6.7%
Two or more races	356	8.3%
Hispanic or Latino (of any race)	728	17.1%

=== 2000 census ===
As of the census of 2000, there were 2,129 people, 1,156 households, and 996 families residing in the CDP. The population density was 1,719.8 inhabitants per square mile (664.0/km^{2}). There were 1,167 housing units at an average density of 510.8 per square mile (197.2/km^{2}). The racial makeup of this CDP was 97.73% White, 1.58% African American, 0.08% Native American, 1.25% Asian, 0.03% Pacific Islander, 0.27% from other races, and 1.09% from two or more races. Hispanic or Latino of any race were 1.31% of the population.

There were 1,156 households, out of which 41.3% had children under the age of 18 living with them, 73.2% were married couples living together, 8.9% had a female householder with no husband present, and 13.8% were non-families. 10.6% of all households were made up of individuals, and 4.3% had someone living alone who was 65 years of age or older. The average household size was 3.40 and the average family size was 3.64.

In the CDP, the population was spread out, with 27.9% under the age of 18, 7.1% from 18 to 24, 32.4% from 25 to 44, 22.2% from 45 to 64, and 10.4% who were 65 years of age or older. The median age was 36 years. For every 100 females, there were 98.1 males. For every 100 females age 18 and over, there were 96.3 males.

The median income for a household in the CDP was $96,000, and the median income for a family was $127,385. Males had a median income of $132,911 versus $41,270 for females. The per capita income for the CDP was $102,489. About 1.3% of families and 0.8% of the population were below the poverty line, including 2.3% of those under age 18 and 8.9% of those age 65 or over.

== Education ==
North Great River is located primarily within the East Islip Union Free School District, although a small portion of the northwestern corner of the hamlet is within the Central Islip Union Free School District. Students who reside within the hamlet and attend public schools will go to school in one of these two districts, depending on where in the hamlet they live.
