= Connetquot River =

River in New York, United States

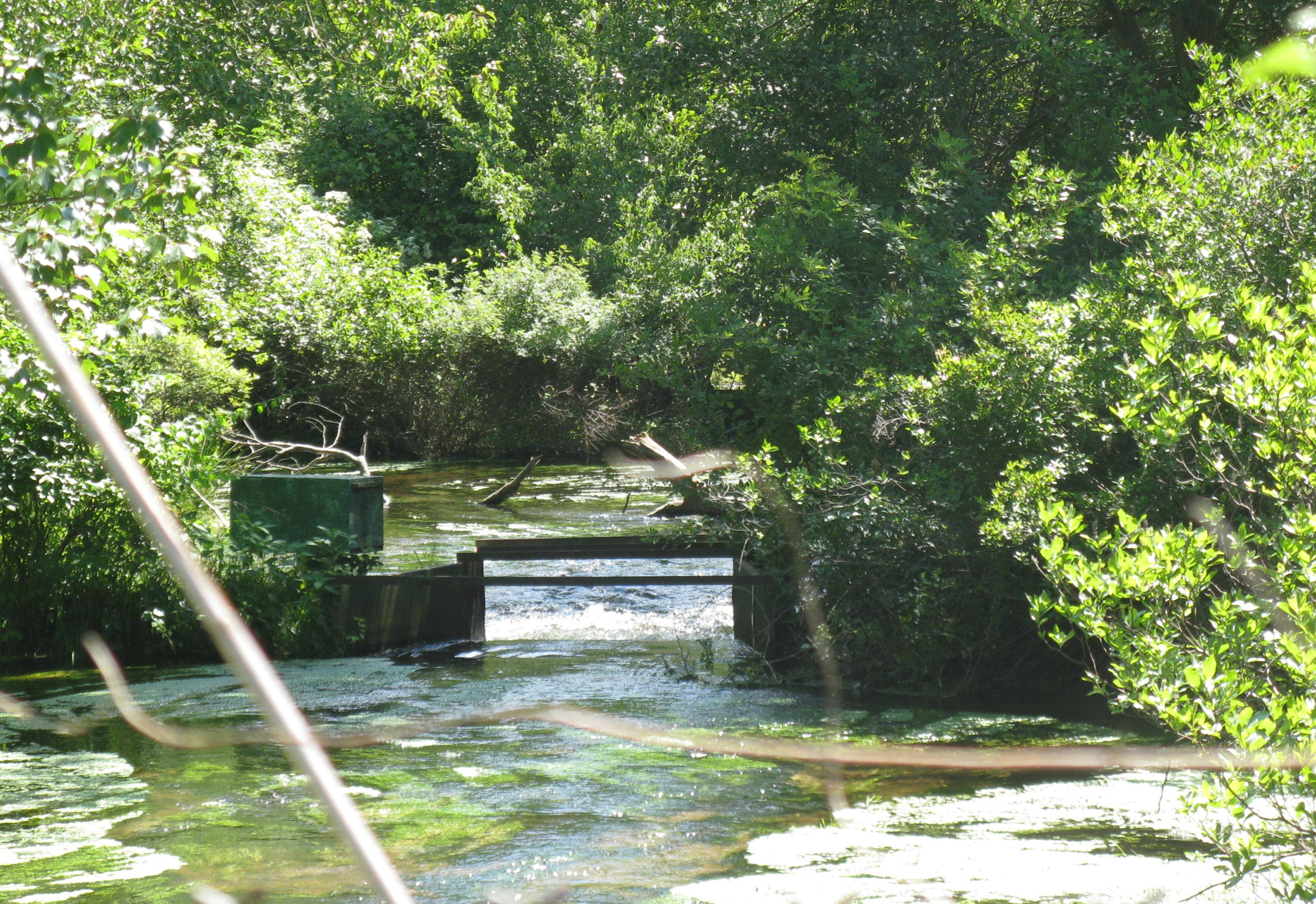
- Headwaters of the Connetquot River

Location
- Country: United States

Physical characteristics
- Source
  - location: Lakeland County Park, Islandia, New York
  - elevation: 50 feet (15 m)
- Mouth
  - location: Nicholls Bay on the Great South Bay
  - coordinates: 40°43′22″N 73°07′41″W
  - elevation: 0 ft (0 m)
- Length: 6 mi (9.7 km)
- Basin size: 4,500 acres (7 sq mi)

The Connetquot River (also known as Great River) is a six-mile-long (10 km) river in Islip, New York. It is one of the four longest rivers on Long Island and is recognized by the state as a Wild, Scenic and Recreational River. It is particularly known for its brook, brown and rainbow trout fly fishing.

== Description ==
The upper reaches of the river including its headwaters are totally in the Connetquot River State Park Preserve or Lakeland County Park before it becomes an estuary. It starts just south of the Long Island Expressway from springs in the Lakeland County Park in Islandia where it is called Connetquot Brook. The estuary portion south of Sunrise Highway at Oakdale is officially called the Connetquot River although in popular usage both the brook and river share the same name.

The name comes from the Secatogue tribe name for "Great River" and is different from the Carmans River on Long Island which at one time was called the Connecticut River.

The entire Connetquot River watershed habitat represents the largest undeveloped contiguous area within Suffolk County that covers an entire river watershed. The river is generated entirely from groundwater springs, and like all other rivers on Long Island, does not arise from a lake.

== List of crossings of the Connetquot River ==
Crossings	Carries	Location	Coordinates
Unnamed road bridge	I-495 (Long Island Expressway) Eastbound service road.	Islandia	
Unnamed road bridge	Johnson Avenue	Islandia	'
Unnamed railroad bridge	Main Line of the Long Island Rail Road	Islandia	
Unnamed road bridge	Perimeter Road	Connetquot River State Park	
Unnamed road bridge	NY 454 (Veterans Memorial Highway)	Connetquot River State Park	
Bunces Bridge	Long Island Greenbelt Trail	Connetquot River State Park	
Unnamed footbridge	Red Trail (North)	Connetquot River State Park	
Unnamed footbridge	Red Trail (Fish Hatchery)	Connetquot River State Park	
Unnamed footbridge and dam	Red and Blue Trail	Connetquot River State Park	
Unnamed road bridge	NY 27 (Sunrise Highway)	Connetquot River State Park	
Unnamed road bridge	CR 85 (Montauk Highway)	Connetquot River State Park	
Unnamed railroad bridge	Montauk Branch of the Long Island Rail Road	Great River and Oakdale	
Unnamed road bridge	Biltmore Avenue	Great River and Oakdale	

== See also ==
- Mill River – Another north-south river on Long Island, located further west in Nassau County.
