= South Side Sportsmen's Club =

Historic district in New York, United States

- Southside Sportsmens Club District
- U.S. National Register of Historic Places
- U.S. Historic district
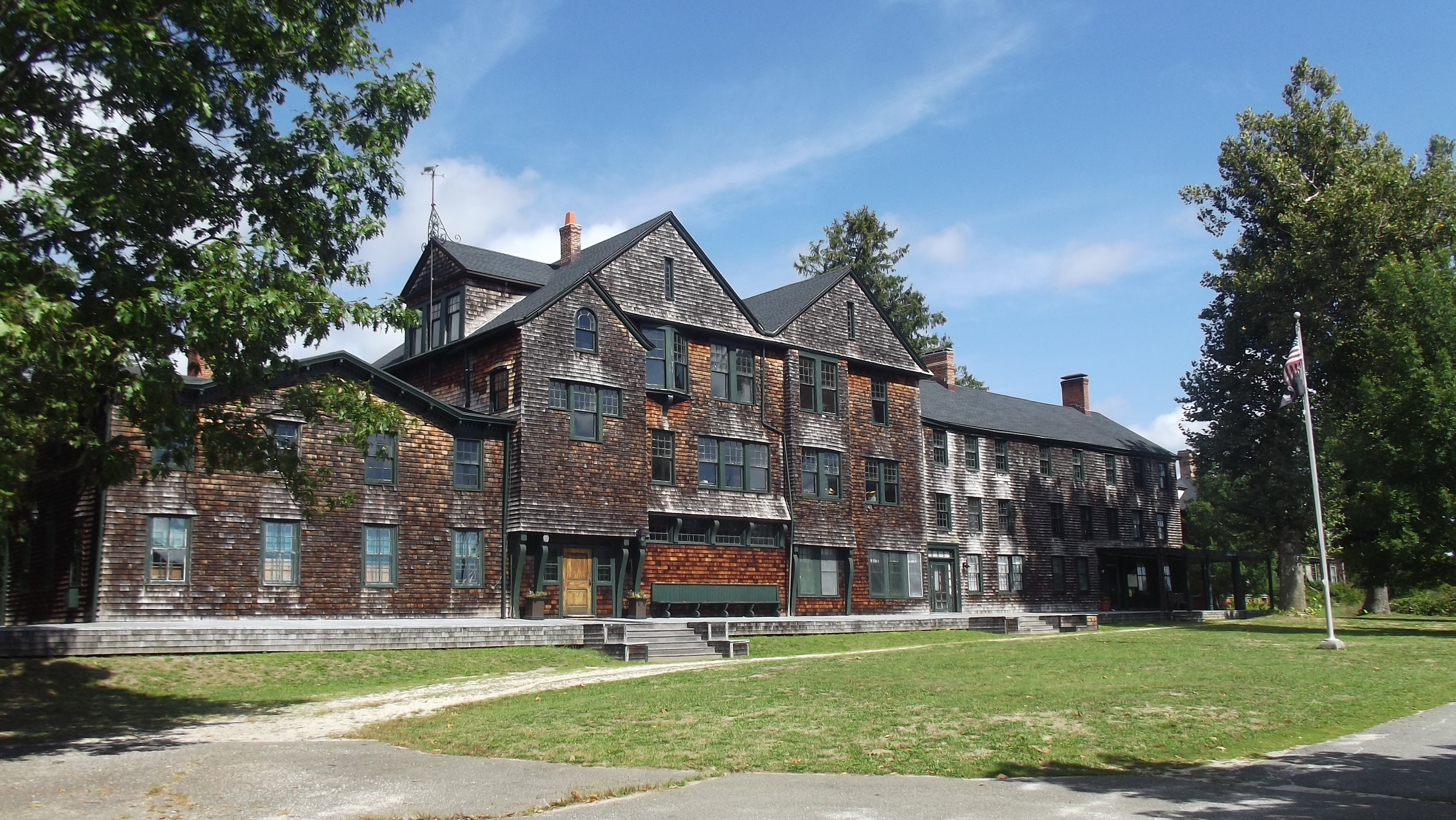
- The main clubhouse

- Location within New York
- Nearest city: Great River, New York
- Coordinates: 40°45′1.08″N 73°9′1.8″W
- Built: 1830
- Architect: Bradford Gilbert; Ashby & Breckenridge
- Architectural style: Colonial Revival
- NRHP reference No.: 73001272
- Added to NRHP: July 23, 1973

South Side Sportsmen's Club was a recreational club that catered to the wealthy businessmen of Long Island during the gold coast era from the 1870s through the 1960s. Its main clubhouse and other facilities were added to the National Register of Historic Places as the Southside Sportsmens Club District in 1973, and are today contained within the Connetquot River State Park Preserve.

== History ==
In 1886, a club was formed and chartered under the name of "The South Side Sportsmen's Club of Long Island". The first article of the constitution of the association stated, "This club is established for the protection of game birds and fish and for the promotion of social intercourse among its members."

By 1907 there were one hundred members including George Slade, William Bayard Cutting, John Cochrane, Frank Hall, George De Witt, Esq., Daniel Fearing, Frederic Rhinelander, W.K. Vanderbilt, Alfred Wagstaff, Jr., Esq., and H.B. Hollins. Herbert R. Clarke was an honorary member. Included among guests was Ulysses S. Grant.

In 1908 the club owned 2,324 acres (9.40 km^{2}) and leased an additional 1,147 acres (4.64 km^{2}) from the Breeze family. The Connetquot Brook runs through the property for a distance of about four miles (6.4 km) from railroad to railroad. This Brook empties into Great South Bay. Its lower part is known today as "Great River", but on older maps and on the government maps it is shown as the "Connetquot River".

The Long Island Railroad once had a stop between Great River and Oakdale for the Sportsman's Club. The stop was called the "Clubhouse". It was abandoned in the first half of the twentieth century.

The South Side Sportsmen's Club promoted many of the laws protecting game not only on Long Island but throughout the state. The club is no longer in existence, and the property is now part of the Connetquot River State Park Preserve owned by the New York State Office of Parks, Recreation and Historic Preservation.

== Facilities ==
The club's facilities included a main clubhouse building, a smaller residence building, and an old wheat and corn-grinding gristmill built c.1750 and operated until 1878, among other service buildings, that are still standing in the Connetquot River State Park Preserve. Part of the main building built in 1820 was originally Snedecor's Tavern (known as "Obe Snedecor's") owned by Eliphalet (Liff) Snedecor on the old stage road. The "shingle style" clubhouse was the first building designed by architect Bradford Gilbert. Between 1866 and 1973, it was used as the clubhouse. Members and their guests used the residence when visiting for fishing, sporting clays and other types of outdoor recreation. The main clubhouse contains an elaborate library, billiard room, dining hall, clubhouse room, and various bedrooms. Currently the building houses the New York State Regional Environmental Education Office and Interpretive Center, historic exhibits and Outdoor Learning Laboratory of BOCES Scope.

South Side Sportsmen's Club was added to the National Register of Historic Places in 1973. It is now a meeting place for the Vanderbilt Historical Society and other groups.
