= Tom McNeece =

American boxer

Tom McNeece (born August 25, 1958) was a professional American Light Heavyweight boxer from Oakdale, Long Island, New York. McNeece had an extensive amateur career before turning professional.

On June 9, 1977 at the Embassy Hall in North Bergen, New Jersey McNeece had his first professional fight. He won a four round decision over Mike Pittman. Two weeks later McNeece won a four round decision over Al Ware at Madison Square Garden in New York City. On February 4, 1978 McNeece won a disputed four round decision over a very tough Cornell Chavis at Madison Square Garden.

McNeece was unbeaten in his first eleven fights with nine wins and two draws.

McNeece lost his first fight on May 22, 1980 at the Ice World in Totowa, New Jersey when he was TKO'd in the second round by Tony Mesoraca. McNeece bounced back from his first loss and TKO'd Elijah Hamm in one round at Glen Cove, Long Island, New York.

In his next fight McNeece was knocked out by undefeated Euclides Valdez in the fifth round at the Felt Forum in New York City. On May 28, 1981 McNeece knocked out John Gallagher in four rounds at the Colonie Hill Catering Hall in Hauppauge, Long Island, New York.

In a rematch with Euclides Valdez on April 16, 1982 at the Felt Forum McNeece was again defeated on a fourth round technical knockout.

During his professional career McNeece boxed three times at Madison Square Garden in New York City and boxed three times in Atlantic City, New Jersey.

McNeece came from a fighting family. His father Billy McNeece was a professional Middleweight who boxed in the 1950s. His brother Jimmy McNeece was a 1976 New York Golden Gloves Champion and was also a professional boxer.

Tom McNeece's unofficial professional record was thirteen wins four losses and three draws.
