= Oakdale, New York =

- Hamlet and census-designated place
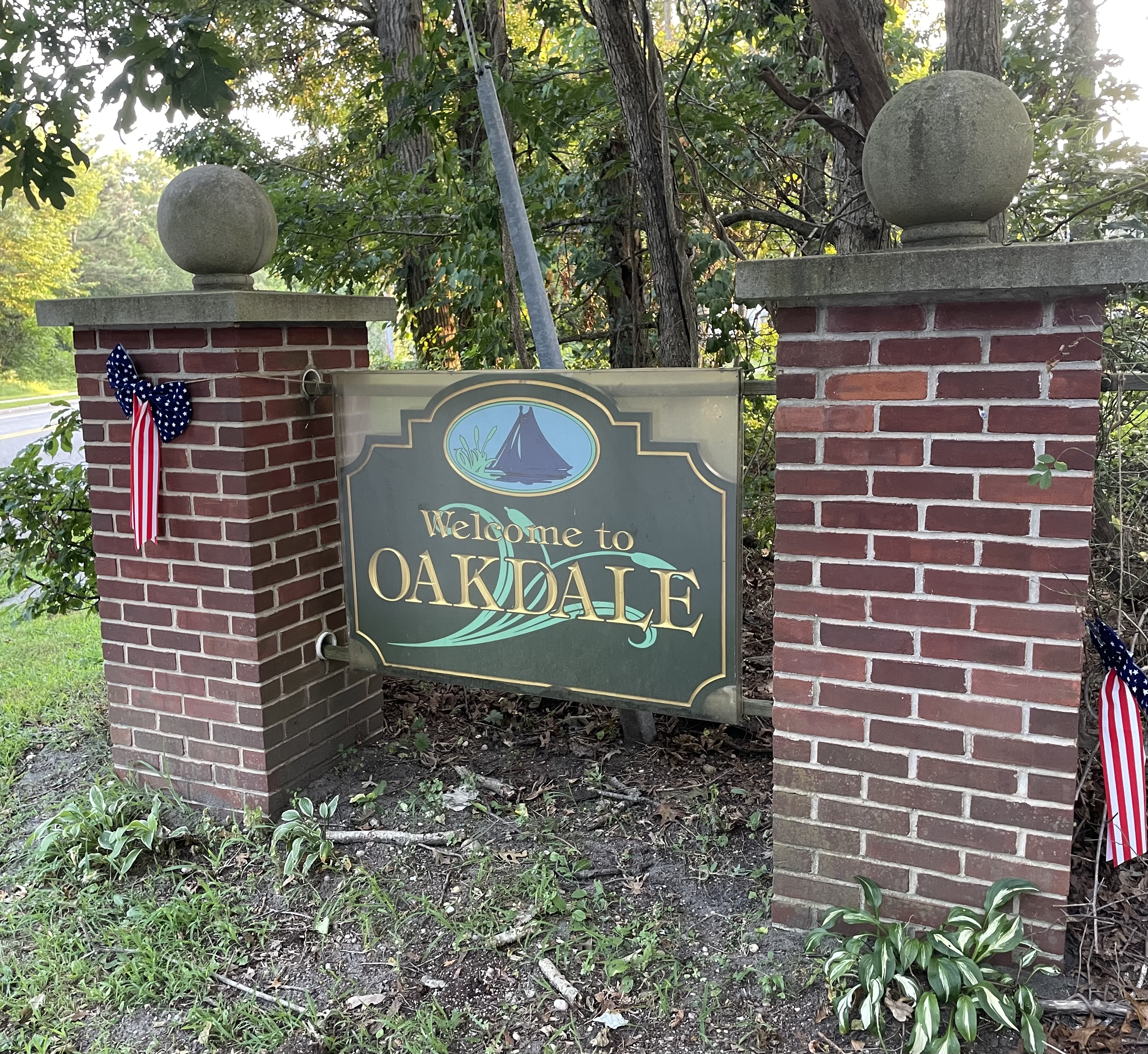
- Sign on Oakdale-Bohemia road greeting passersby

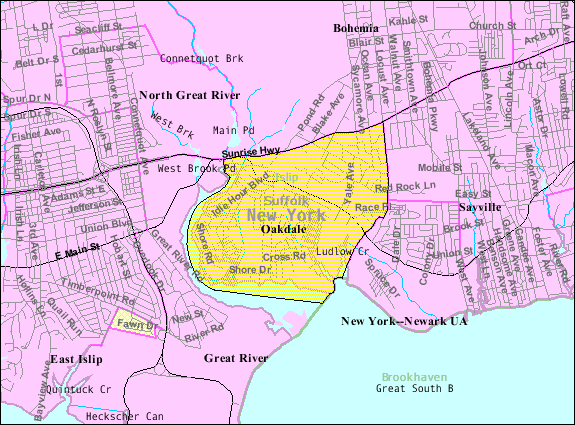

- Location on Long Island Location within the state of New York
- Coordinates: 40°44′23″N 73°8′23″W
- Country: United States
- State: New York
- County: Suffolk
- Town: Islip

Area
  - Total: 3.80 sq mi (9.83 km^{2})
  - Land: 3.18 sq mi (8.23 km^{2})
  - Water: 0.62 sq mi (1.60 km^{2})
- Elevation: 9.8 ft (3 m)

Population (2020)
  - Total: 7,430
  - Density: 2,338.8/sq mi (903.03/km^{2})
- Time zone: UTC-5 (Eastern (EST))
  - Summer (DST): UTC-4 (EDT)
- ZIP code: 11769
- Area codes: 631, 934
- FIPS code: 36-54144
- GNIS feature ID: 0959162

Oakdale is a hamlet (and census-designated place) in Suffolk County, New York, United States, situated on the South Shore of Long Island. As of the 2020 census, Oakdale had a population of 7,430. Oakdale is in the Town of Islip. It has been home to Gilded Age mansions, the South Side Sportsmen's Club, the main campus of Dowling College and the Long Island Sharks hockey team. TSPL, “Trampoline Soccer Premier League” was also created here. It is now home to Connetquot River State Park Preserve.

== History ==
Oakdale was founded around two Native American trade routes, where Sunrise Highway and Montauk Highway currently lie. Oakdale was part of the royal land grant given to William Nicoll, who founded Islip Town in 1697. Local historian Charles P. Dickerson wrote in 1975 that Oakdale's name appeared to come from a Nicoll descendant in the mid-19th century. The community includes: St. John's Episcopal Church, built in 1765, is the third oldest church on Long Island.

The community originated with a tavern owned by Eliphalet (Liff) Snedecor in what is now Connetquot River State Park Preserve. Soon after its founding in 1820, Snedecor's Tavern began drawing New York bluebloods and business barons who wined and dined in remote joy when they weren't fishing and hunting nearby. "Liff's food is as good as his creek", a magazine writer declared in 1839 referring to the food and Connetquot River. The writer added: "and the two are only second to his mint juleps and champagne punch; whoever gainsays either fact deserves hanging without benefit of clergy."

In 1866, as the railroad reached the area, Liff's wealthy patrons formed the South Side Sportsmen's Club, and soon the race was on to see who could create the most superb spread in the thick forests adjoining Great South Bay. The most prominent were built by William K. Vanderbilt, grandson of railroad magnate Cornelius Vanderbilt; Frederick G. Bourne, president of the Singer Sewing Machine Co., and Christopher Robert II, an eccentric heir to a sugar fortune. Meanwhile, William Bayard Cutting, a lawyer, financier and railroad man, built his estate next door in Great River, New York which had once been west Oakdale.

In 1912, Jacob Ockers of Oakdale organized the Bluepoint Oyster Co., which became the largest oyster producer and shipper in the country.

Renovations to Oakdale's only community pool at Byron Lake Park reached completion in 2024.

== Gilded Age estates ==
Gilded Age estates were a feature of Oakdale's past toward the end of the 19th century and into the early 20th century.

=== Idle Hour ===
In 1882, William Kissam Vanderbilt built the most noted one, Idle Hour, 900-acre (3.6 km^{2}) on the Connetquot River. The lavish, wooden 110-room home was destroyed by fire on April 15, 1899, while his son, Willie K. II, was honeymooning there. Willie and his new wife escaped. It was promptly rebuilt of red brick and gray stone, with exquisite furnishings, for $3 million. The building at the time was considered among the finest homes in America. His daughter Consuelo had also honeymooned there when she married the Duke of Marlborough in 1895.

After Vanderbilt's death in 1920, the mansion went through several phases and visitors, including a brief stay during Prohibition by gangster Dutch Schultz. Around that time, cow stalls, pig pens and corn cribs on the farm portion of Idle Hour were converted into a short-lived bohemian artists' colony that included figures such as George Elmer Browne and Roman (Bon) Bonet-Sintas as well as sculptor Catherine Lawson, costume designer Olga Meervold, and pianist Claude Govier, and Francis Gow-Smith and his wife Carol. The estate was most recently the home of Dowling College, a struggling school which closed in August 2016.

=== Pepperidge Hall ===
By 1888, Christopher R. Robert II (son of Christopher Robert) built a spectacular castle just east of Idle Hour called Pepperidge Hall, furnished in the French style for his wife. But the pair didn't get along. On January 2, 1898, she told police she found Robert shot to death in his Manhattan apartment. It was ruled a suicide and she moved to Paris. The mansion featured in silent movies 1916–1920, fell into disrepair and was razed in 1941.

=== Indian Neck Hall ===
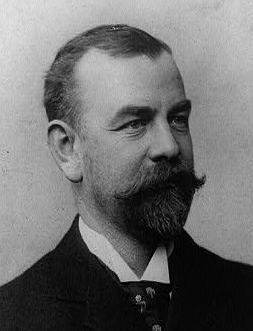
Frederick Gilbert Bourne

In 1897, Frederick Gilbert Bourne, who began with 438 acres (1.77 km^{2}) but later owned land reaching to West Sayville, completed his mansion, Indian Neck Hall, on the east side of Oakdale. Bourne was active locally, as commodore of the Sayville Yacht Club, and was generous to the local fire department. The eastern part of his estate now comprises the West Sayville County Golf Course and the Long Island Maritime Museum, while much of the middle portion is developed with homes. Bourne died in 1920. Six years later the mansion, on the western end, became the site of La Salle Military Academy, operated by the Christian Brothers, a Catholic order. In 1993, the brothers converted the academy into a kindergarten-through-high-school "global learning community". In 2001, La Salle was closed and it was bought by St. John's University of New York.

== Geography ==
Oakdale is located at 40°44′23″N 73°8′23″W (40.739858, -73.139696).

According to the United States Census Bureau, the CDP has a total area of 3.8 square miles (9.8 km^{2}), of which 3.3 square miles (8.5 km^{2}) is land and 0.4 square miles (1.0 km^{2}) 11.70%) is water.

== Demographics ==
Historical population
| Census | Pop. | Note | %± |
|---|---|---|---|
| 2020 | 7,430 | | — |
U.S. Decennial Census

As of the 2020 United States census, there were 7,430 people and 2,717 households residing in the CDP. The racial makeup of the CDP was 88.3% White, 6.4% African American, 0.6% Asian, 0.3% from other races, and 4.4% from two or more races. Hispanic or Latino of any race were 4.7% of the population.

In the CDP, the population was spread out, with 14.7% under the age of 18, 4.3% under the age of five, and 24.1% who were 65 years of age or older.

The median income for a household in the CDP was $112,464, while the per capita income for the CDP was $54,058. About 6.3% of the population were below the poverty line.

== Education ==
Oakdale is within the Connetquot Central School District. Connetquot High School is the comprehensive high school of that district.

The former St. John's University Oakdale campus was partially in Oakdale. The university had acquired it, then La Salle Center (previously La Salle Military Academy), in 1999. The university leased the center to La Salle Center until its 2001 closure. In 2016 Amity University had purchased that campus. Amity then decided to establish a New York branch of Harrow School. Harrow International School New York is scheduled to open, in the former St. John's campus, in September 2025.

== Transportation ==
The Long Island Rail Road provides service to Oakdale via the Montauk Branch. Suffolk County Transit buses also serve Oakdale via the 2 route which include stops adjacent to Oakdale's LIRR station.

== Notable people ==
- William Kissam Vanderbilt
- William Kissam Vanderbilt II
- Consuelo Vanderbilt
- Harold Stirling Vanderbilt
- Alva Erskine Smith
- Frederick Gilbert Bourne
- Michael Carbonaro
- Dutch Schultz, gangster
- Jane Monheit
- Jimmy McNeece
- Tom McNeece
- Ginny Fields
- Mike Pellegrino
