= Jimmy McNeece =

American boxer

Personal information
- Born: Oakdale, Long Island, New York, U.S.

Boxing career
- Weight class: Lightweight / Flyweight

Boxing record
- Wins: 5
- Losses: 3

Jimmy McNeece was a professional American Lightweight boxer from Oakdale, Long Island, New York. As an amateur boxer, McNeece won the 1976 New York Golden Gloves 112 lb. Open Championship. McNeece defeated amateur standout and future professional boxing star Paul Devorce in the finals at Madison Square Garden.

His father, Billy McNeece, was a professional boxer in the 1950s. Additionally, his brother Tom McNeece boxed as a professional in the 1970s and the 1980s.

Jimmy McNeece turned professional boxer on April 27, 1978, at Madison Square Garden and outpointed Melvin Boynton over four rounds. On August 25, 1978, McNeece was defeated by Louis Hubela on points over six rounds at Madison Square Garden.

McNeece boxed on the West Coast in early 1979. On January 26, 1979, McNeece defeated Sergio Nualarte at the San Diego Coliseum. McNeece was defeated at the famed Olympic Auditorium on February 8, 1979, by decision to Danny Patino over six rounds. On July 20, 1980, McNeece outpointed Robert Johnson over four rounds at the Great Gorge Playboy Club in McAfee, New Jersey.

His unofficial professional record was five wins and three losses.
