= Integrated Administration and Control System =

Integrated Administration and Control System (IACS) is an administrative tool used by the European Union for geographical data, particularly land use data. It was first introduced in 1992 by EU Council Regulation 3508/92 to manage and control agricultural subsidies to farmers under the Common Agricultural Policy (CAP) and prevent fraud. IACS provides a system to create and maintain a database of georeferenced data for agricultural land at the land parcel level which is standardised across all EU countries and can be used to ensure that land eligibility criteria are met and subsidy payments made are accurate.

== Components and interoperability ==
IACS is made up of various components. The Land Parcel Identification System (LPIS) is a geospatial database that maps and monitors agricultural parcels to confirm land eligibility. A Geospatial Aid Application allows farmers to digitally declare their land use, which is then verified against LPIS data. The system also incorporates data from Copernicus Programme Sentinel satellite missions. IACS is aligned with the INSPIRE directive ((EU) 2007/2) to enhance the interoperability and accessibility of geospatial data, making it easier for IACS data be used in other domains.

== Significance and evolution ==
IACS has become a widely used tool for transparency and accountability in funding payments and policy performance monitoring. More recently, it has been integrated with environmental data sharing platforms to keep pace with changes in regulations and their monitoring requirements, as well as updated to integrate new technology. However, it still faces accessibility problems and uneven application across member states and regions, with 44 different implementations in place as of 2023.
