= Land-parcel identification system =

System to identify land use

A land-parcel identification system (LPIS) is a system to identify land use for a given country. It utilises orthophotos; aerial photographs and high precision satellite images that are digitally rendered to extract as much meaningful spatial information as possible. A unique number is given to each land parcel to provide unique identification in space and time. This information is then updated regularly to monitor the evolution of the land cover and the management of the crops.
