= Connetquot River State Park Preserve =

State park in Suffolk County, New York

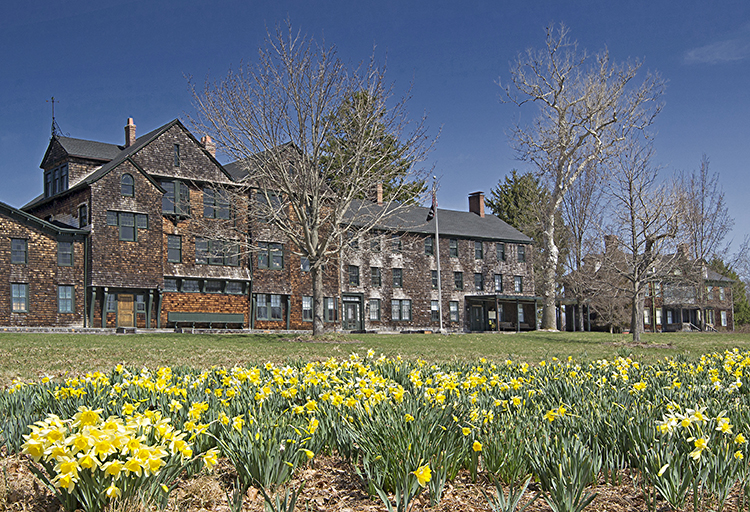
- The former Southside Sportsmen's Clubhouse within Connetquot River State Park.

- Location within New York
- Type: State park
- Location: Town of Islip, Suffolk County, New York
- Coordinates: 40°45′54″N 73°09′04″W
- Area: 3,473 acres (14.05 km^{2})
- Operator: New York State Office of Parks, Recreation and Historic Preservation
- Visitors: 239,530 (in 2024)
- Open: All year
- Website: Connetquot River State Park Preserve

Connetquot River State Park Preserve is a 3,473-acre (14.05 km^{2}) state park and conservation area in the Town of Islip in Suffolk County, New York in the United States. The park contains the Long Island Environmental Interpretive Center as well as the Southside Sportsmens Club District, which was listed on the National Register of Historic Places in 1973.

== Park facilities ==
The park offers hiking, fishing, a bridle path, nature trails, cross-country skiing, snow shoeing, a museum, and recreation activities. It also contains the site of the Southside Sportsmens Club District, which has been on the National Register of Historic Places since 1973.

The park is home to the Long Island Environmental Interpretive Center, which provides educational programs year-round. The center hosts the Regional Environmental Education Team, which assists schools, youth groups, and other organizations by leading interpretation activities within the region's state parks.

Vehicles are charged an entrance fee, however pedestrians may enter for free through several gates along the park's perimeter. A permit is required for horseback riding within the park. The park is a carry-in carry-out facility, as there are no garbage bins along the trails. Additionally there are no picnic facilities or play areas for children. Anglers possessing proper permits may fish for brook, brown, and rainbow trout within the park.

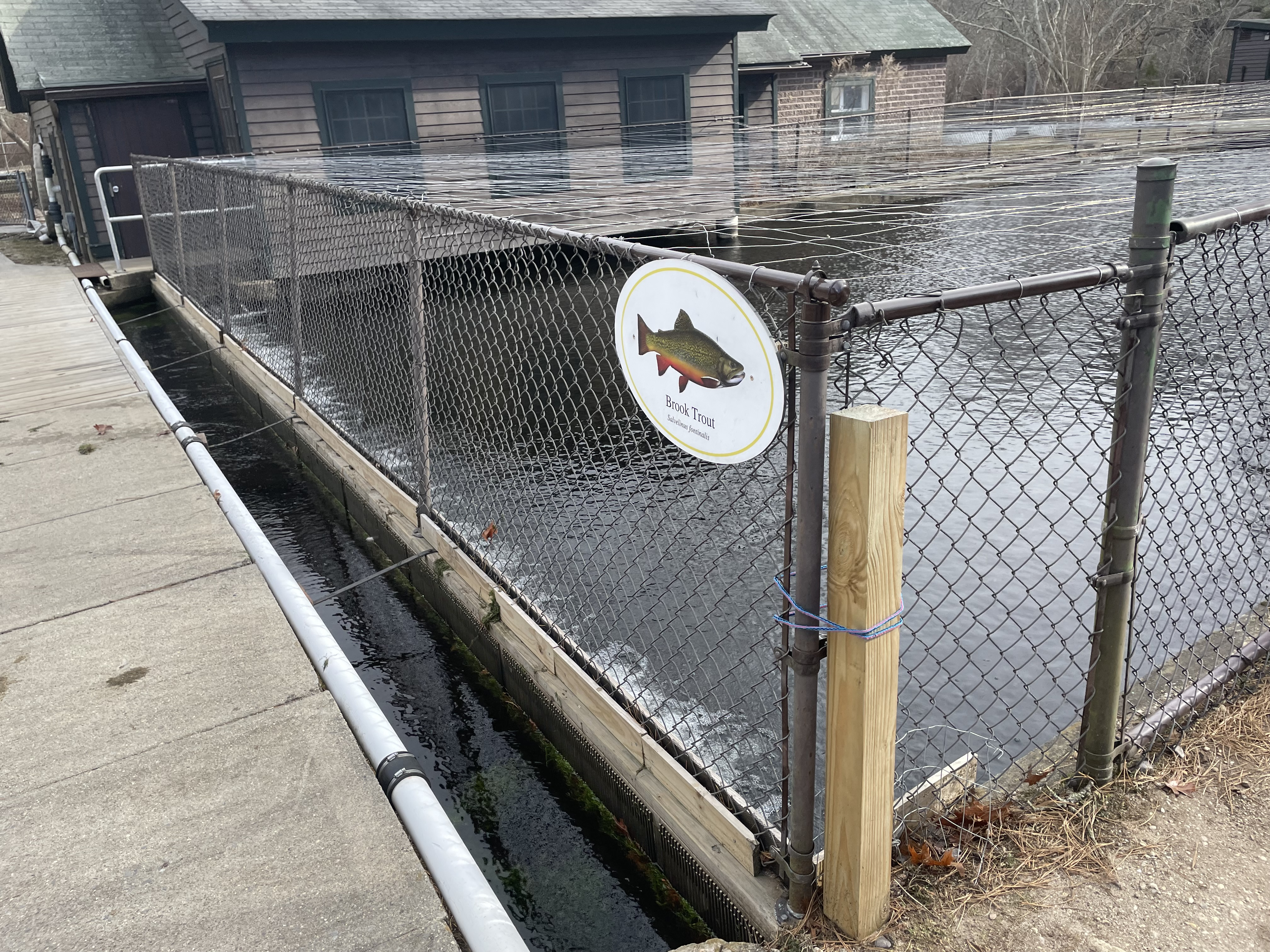
A hatchery for brook trout located in the park - one of the two fish hatcheries that are currently in operation

== See also ==
- Connetquot River
- List of New York state parks
