= National Register of Historic Places listings in Smithtown (town), New York =

This list is intended to provide a comprehensive listing of entries in the National Register of Historic Places in Town of Smithtown, New York. The locations of National Register properties for which the latitude and longitude coordinates are included below, may be seen in an online map.

== Listings ==
	Name on the Register	Image	Date listed	Location	City or town	Description
1	Beachbend	Beachbend	August 9, 1993 (#93000698)	Smith Lane; 40°54′10″N 73°11′03″W	Nissequogue	
2	Blydenburgh Park Historic District	Blydenburgh Park Historic District	August 11, 1983 (#83001807)	Blydenburgh County Park; 40°50′36″N 73°13′34″W	Smithtown	
3	Box Hill Estate		December 4, 1973 (#73001276)	Northwest of St. James on Moriches Road; 40°53′22″N 73°10′36″W	St. James	
4	By-the-Harbor		August 9, 1993 (#93000699)	Moriches Road; 40°53′30″N 73°10′51″W	Nissequogue	
5	East Farm	East Farm	August 9, 1993 (#93000700)	Harbor Road, North side, at Shep Jones Lane; 40°54′48″N 73°09′17″W	Head of the Harbor	
6	First Presbyterian Church	First Presbyterian Church	December 23, 1977 (#77000983)	175 East Main Street; 40°51′24″N 73°11′18″W	Branch	
7	Fort Salonga		May 21, 1982 (#82003406)	Address Restricted	Fort Salonga	
8	Halliock Inn	Halliock Inn	August 7, 1974 (#74001310)	263 East Main Street; 40°51′20″N 73°10′50″W	Branch	
9	Harbor House	Harbor House	August 9, 1993 (#93000701)	Spring Hollow Road; 40°53′48″N 73°10′44″W	Nissequogue	
10	Hauppauge Methodist Episcopal Church	Hauppauge Methodist Episcopal Church	August 27, 2020 (#100005484)	473 Town Line Road; 40°49′31″N 73°12′20″W	Hauppauge	
11	Land of Clover	Land of Clover	August 9, 1993 (#93000702)	Long Beach Road, South side 40°54′48″N 73°11′12″W	Nissequogue	The former Lathrop Brown Estate, now occupied by a private boarding school called The Knox School.
12	The Mallows		August 9, 1993 (#93000703)	Emmet Way; 40°54′59″N 73°09′07″W	Head of the Harbor	
13	Mills Pond District	Mills Pond District	August 1, 1973 (#73001277)	East of St. James on NY 25A; 40°54′02″N 73°08′58″W	St. James	
14	James W. and Anne Smith Phyfe Estate		August 9, 1993 (#93000704)	87 Stillwater Road; 40°54′34″N 73°11′04″W	Nissequogue	
15	Rassapeague	Rassapeague	August 9, 1993 (#93000705)	Long Beach Road, South side 40°54′58″N 73°10′55″W	Nissequogue	
16	William J. Ryan Estate		August 9, 1993 (#93000706)	Moriches Road; 40°54′07″N 73°11′20″W	Nissequogue	
17	Saint James District	Saint James District	July 20, 1973 (#73001275)	On NY 25A; 40°53′02″N 73°09′46″W	Saint James	
18	St. James Firehouse	St. James Firehouse	August 4, 2023 (#100009195)	533 NY 25A; 40°53′14″N 73°09′31″W	Saint James	
19	Shore Cottage		August 9, 1993 (#93000707)	Harbor Road, East side 40°53′39″N 73°10′23″W	Head of the Harbor	
20	Obadiah Smith House	Obadiah Smith House	December 6, 1996 (#96001422)	853 Saint Johnland Road; 40°53′38″N 73°13′47″W	Kings Park	
21	Thatch Meadow Farm		February 20, 2020 (#93000711)	Harbor Rd., west side, opposite Bacon Rd. 40°54′31″N 73°09′32″W	Head of the Harbor	Last remaining portion of old estate, built on 18th century farm.
22	Village of Branch Historic District		September 11, 1986 (#86002514)	Along north side of Middle Country Road; 40°51′56″N 73°10′59″W	Branch	
23	Frederick and Annie Wagner Residence and St. Patrick's Roman Catholic Church	Frederick and Annie Wagner Residence and St. Patrick's Roman Catholic Church	August 8, 2019 (#100004240)	37 Juniper Avenue & 38 Mayflower Avenue; 40°51′17″N 73°12′08″W	Smithtown	1912 Gustav Stickley house for early American motorsports promoter, and adjacent Tudor Revival Catholic church that served Smithtown's Irish American community from same era
24	Kate Annette Wetherill Estate	Kate Annette Wetherill Estate	August 9, 1993 (#93000708)	Harbor Hill Road, South side 40°53′32″N 73°10′11″W	Head of the Harbor	
25	Edmund Wetmore Estate		August 10, 2026 (#100013289)	99 Sunken Meadow Road; 40°54′05″N 73°16′31″W	Fort Salonga	
26	Woodcrest		August 9, 1993 (#93000709)	Moriches Road; 40°54′00″N 73°10′59″W	Nissequogue	
27	Wyandanch Club Historic District	Wyandanch Club Historic District	August 3, 1990 (#90001143)	Jericho Turnpike, southwest of its junction with Meadow Road; 40°51′03″N 73°13′40″W	Smithtown	
28	York Hall	York Hall	October 23, 2023 (#100009455)	799 Saint Johnland Rd. 40°53′49″N 73°14′10″W	Kings Park	Former Kings Park Asylum main auditorium, church, and theater.

== See also ==
- National Register of Historic Places listings in New York
- National Register of Historic Places listings in Suffolk County, New York
