= Michael J. Fitzpatrick (politician) =

American politician (born 1957)

Mike Fitzpatrick

Member of the New York State Assembly from the 8th district
- Incumbent
- Assumed office January 1, 2003
- Preceded by: Robert C. Wertz (redistricting)
- Constituency: 7th district (2003–2012); 8th district (2013–present)

Personal details
- Born: April 15, 1957 (age 69) Jamaica, Queens, New York, U.S.
- Party: Republican
- Spouse: Lorena Fitzpatrick
- Children: 2
- Education: St. Michael's College (B.A.)
- Website: https://assembly.state.ny.us/mem/?ad=008

Michael J. Fitzpatrick (born April 15, 1957) is an American politician who serves as the Assemblyman for the 8th district of the New York State Assembly. He is a Republican. The district includes portions of Islip and Smithtown, including Kings Park, Nesconset, St. James, Village of the Branch, Head of the Harbor and Nissequogue in Suffolk County on Long Island.

== Early life and career ==
Fitzpatrick was born in Jamaica, Queens and raised in Hauppauge, Long Island. He is a graduate of Hauppauge High School and received his B.A. in business administration from Saint Michael's College in Vermont.

Fitzpatrick has held elected office continuously since 1988, serving on the Smithtown Town Council for 15 years prior to his election to the Assembly. Outside of his legislative duties, he maintains private sector employment as an investment associate with UBS Financial Services in Port Jefferson, New York.

== New York State Assembly ==
Fitzpatrick was first elected to the New York State Assembly in November 2002 and assumed office on January 1, 2003.

=== Committee assignments ===
As of the 2025–2026 legislative session, Fitzpatrick serves as the Ranking Minority Member of the Committee on Housing. He is also a member of the committees on Ways and Means, Higher Education, and Banks.

=== Legislative activities ===
Fitzpatrick's legislative tenure has coincided with a significant regional housing shortage. Reports from Newsday indicate that younger residents are leaving Long Island at high rates due to an "affordability crisis." The Long Island Association has identified housing affordability as a top policy priority to combat this demographic shift.

As the ranking Republican on the Housing Committee, Fitzpatrick has primarily advocated for demand-side measures, such as tax credits for first-time homebuyers (A07525) and down payment assistance (A07706), while opposing the New York Housing Compact, a state initiative proposed by Governor Kathy Hochul which sought to mandate transit-oriented development to increase housing supply.

In addition to fiscal policy, Fitzpatrick has sponsored legislation regarding local regulation and social issues. He sponsored a bill authorizing the Town of Smithtown to regulate the use of longbows and crossbows (A05967) and has repeatedly sponsored the "Human Cloning Prohibition Act" (A05987).

== Election history ==
Fitzpatrick was first elected in 2002 and has been re-elected every two years since. Prior to redistricting in 2012, he represented the 7th Assembly District.

Election History
| Office | Year | Election | Results |
|---|---|---|---|
| New York State Assembly, District 7 | 2002 | General | √ Michael J. Fitzpatrick (R) 61.1% Louis D'Amaro (D) 38.9% |
| New York State Assembly, District 7 | 2004 | General | √ Michael J. Fitzpatrick (R) 61.3% Louis D'Amaro (D) 38.7% |
| New York State Assembly, District 7 | 2006 | General | √ Michael J. Fitzpatrick (R) 60.1% John Bugler (D) 39.9% |
| New York State Assembly, District 7 | 2008 | General | √ Michael J. Fitzpatrick (R) 63.9% Christopher T. Ciacci (D) 36.1% |
| New York State Assembly, District 7 | 2010 | General | √ Michael J. Fitzpatrick (R) 71.9% Jason Zove (D) 28.1% |
| New York State Assembly, District 8 | 2012 | General | √ Michael J. Fitzpatrick (R) 66.0% Jason Zove (D) 34.0% |
| New York State Assembly, District 8 | 2014 | General | √ Michael J. Fitzpatrick (R) 72.8% John Alberts (D) 27.2% |
| New York State Assembly, District 8 | 2016 | General | √ Michael J. Fitzpatrick (R) 66.2% Richard Macellaro (D) 33.8% |
| New York State Assembly, District 8 | 2018 | General | √ Michael J. Fitzpatrick (R) 61.6% David Morrissey (D) 38.4% |
| New York State Assembly, District 8 | 2020 | General | √ Michael J. Fitzpatrick (R) 61.3% Dylan Rice (D) 38.7% |
| New York State Assembly, District 8 | 2022 | General | √ Michael J. Fitzpatrick (R) 67.3% James M. Anthony (D) 32.6% |
| New York State Assembly, District 8 | 2024 | General | √ Michael J. Fitzpatrick (R) 64.9% Steven Basileo (D) 35.1% |

=== Personal life ===
Fitzpatrick is married to the former Lorena Herrera of Chihuahua, Mexico; the couple has two children, Corina and Michael. They reside in St. James, New York.
