= New York's 8th State Assembly district =

American legislative district

Assemblymember
Michael Fitzpatrick; R–St. James
- Registration: 38.5% Republican; 27.1% Democratic; 27.6% No party preference
- Demographics: 85% White; 1% Black; 8% Hispanic; 5% Asian; 0% Native American; 0% Hawaiian/Pacific Islander; 0% Other
- Population (2020): 126,794
- Registered voters: 106,468

New York's 8th State Assembly district is one of the 150 districts in the New York State Assembly. It has been represented by Republican Michael Fitzpatrick since 2003.

== Geography ==
=== 2020s ===
District 8 is in Suffolk County. The district includes the town of Smithtown, including Kings Park, Head of the Harbor, Nesconset, Nissequogue and St. James, and portions of the town of Islip, such as the hamlets of Hauppauge and Islandia.

The district overlaps New York's 1st and 2nd congressional districts, as well as the 4th and 8th districts of the New York State Senate.

=== 2010s ===
District 8 is in Suffolk County. The district includes the town of Smithtown, including Kings Park, Head of the Harbor, Nissequogue and St. James, and the hamlet of Hauppauge, partly within the town of Islip.

== Recent election results ==
=== 2026 ===
2026 New York State Assembly election, District 8
Party	Candidate	Votes	%
Republican	Michael Fitzpatrick		
Conservative	Michael Fitzpatrick		
Total	Michael Fitzpatrick (incumbent)		
Democratic	Lynn Trupiano-O'Keefe		
Write-in			
Total votes			

=== 2024 ===
2024 New York State Assembly election, District 8
Party	Candidate	Votes	%
Republican	Michael Fitzpatrick	44,993	
Conservative	Michael Fitzpatrick	5,575	
Total	Michael Fitzpatrick (incumbent)	50,568	66.0
Democratic	Steven Basileo	24,966	
Working Families	Steven Basileo	1,050	
Total	Steven Basileo	26,016	34.0
Write-in		28	0.0
Total votes		76,612	100.0
Republican hold			

=== 2022 ===
2022 New York State Assembly election, District 8
Party	Candidate	Votes	%
Republican	Michael Fitzpatrick	36,555	
Conservative	Michael Fitzpatrick	5,193	
Total	Michael Fitzpatrick (incumbent)	41,748	68.3
Democratic	Jeanine Aponte	19,376	31.7
Write-in		12	0.0
Total votes		61,136	100.0
Republican hold			

=== 2020 ===
2020 New York State Assembly election, District 8
Party	Candidate	Votes	%
Republican	Michael Fitzpatrick	40,760	
Conservative	Michael Fitzpatrick	4,951	
Independence	Michael Fitzpatrick	760	
Safe Neighborhoods	Michael Fitzpatrick	144	
Total	Michael Fitzpatrick (incumbent)	46,615	64.4
Democratic	Dylan Rice	25,809	35.6
Write-in		12	0.0
Total votes		72,436	100.0
Republican hold			

=== 2018 ===
2018 New York State Assembly election, District 8
Party	Candidate	Votes	%
Republican	Michael Fitzpatrick	27,789	
Conservative	Michael Fitzpatrick	3,311	
Independence	Michael Fitzpatrick	749	
Reform	Michael Fitzpatrick	108	
Total	Michael Fitzpatrick (incumbent)	31,957	61.0
Democratic	David Morrissey	20,459	39.0
Write-in		20	0.0
Total votes		52,418	100.0
Republican hold			

=== 2016 ===
2016 New York State Assembly election, District 8
Party	Candidate	Votes	%
Republican	Michael Fitzpatrick	36,528	
Conservative	Michael Fitzpatrick	5,155	
Independence	Michael Fitzpatrick	1,422	
Reform	Michael Fitzpatrick	181	
Total	Michael Fitzpatrick (incumbent)	43,286	69.3
Democratic	Richard Macellaro	19,121	30.7
Write-in		15	0.0
Total votes		62,422	100.0
Republican hold			

=== 2014 ===
2014 New York State Assembly election, District 8
Party	Candidate	Votes	%
Republican	Michael Fitzpatrick	17,769	
Conservative	Michael Fitzpatrick	3,530	
Independence	Michael Fitzpatrick	885	
Total	Michael Fitzpatrick (incumbent)	22,184	65.3
Democratic	Jason Zove	10,591	
Working Families	Jason Zove	1,179	
Total	Jason Zove	11,770	34.7
Write-in		15	0.0
Total votes		33,969	100.0
Republican hold			

=== 2012 ===
2012 New York State Assembly election, District 8
Party	Candidate	Votes	%
Republican	Michael Fitzpatrick	29,289	
Conservative	Michael Fitzpatrick	4,953	
Independence	Michael Fitzpatrick	1,600	
Total	Michael Fitzpatrick (incumbent)	35,842	69.7
Democratic	Jesse Safer	15,586	30.3
Write-in		11	0.0
Total votes		51,439	100.0
Republican hold			
