= Harbor House =

Harbor House may refer to:

- Harbor House (Nissequogue, New York), a national historic district located at Nissequogue in Suffolk County, New York
- Harbor House (restaurant), a restaurant in Elk, Mendocino County, California
- Harbor House of Central Florida, a non-profit state-certified domestic violence shelter near Orlando, in Orange County, Florida
