= Village of the Branch Historic District =

Historic district in New York, United States

- Village of Branch Historic District
- U.S. National Register of Historic Places
- U.S. Historic district
- Location within New York Location within the United States
- Location: Along N side of Middle Country Rd., Branch, New York
- Coordinates: 40°51′56″N 73°10′59″W
- Area: 20 acres (8.1 ha)
- Architectural style: Late 19th And 20th Century Revivals, Colonial, Federal
- NRHP reference No.: 86002514
- Added to NRHP: September 11, 1986

Village of the Branch Historic District is a national historic district located at Village of the Branch in Suffolk County, New York. The district has 22 contributing buildings, one contributing structure, and four contributing objects. It consists of 15 houses, a church, and a library built between about 1700 and 1965. Located within the district and listed separately on the register are the Halliock Inn and First Presbyterian Church.

It was added to the National Register of Historic Places in 1986.
