= J. Lawrence Smith (New York politician) =

American politician

John Lawrence Smith

District attorney of Suffolk County, New York
- In office 1856–1858

County judge of Suffolk County, New York
- In office 1858–1866

Personal details
- Born: September 20, 1816 Nissequogue, New York, U.S.
- Died: March 17, 1889 (aged 72) New York City, U.S.
- Party: Democratic
- Spouse: Sarah Nicoll Clinch
- Children: 6, including James Clinch Smith and Bessie Springs Smith White
- Education: Yale College; Princeton College
- Occupation: Lawyer, politician, judge

John Lawrence Smith (September 20, 1816 – March 17, 1889) was an American lawyer, politician, and judge from New York.

== Early life and education ==
Smith was born on September 20, 1816, in Nissequogue, New York, the son of Richard Smith and Eliza Willett Nicoll. His maternal great-grandfather was General Nathaniel Woodhull, and his maternal great-grandmother was the sister of Declaration of Independence signer William Floyd.

Smith attended the Clinton Academy in East Hampton. He then went to Yale College, where his classmates included Samuel J. Tilden, William M. Evarts, Edwards Pierrepont, Morrison Waite, William W. Eaton, and Benjamin D. Silliman. In 1833, he transferred to Princeton College, graduating in 1837. He then studied law in the office of John L. Lawrence in New York City. He was admitted to the bar in 1840 and initially practiced law in New York City. In 1844, he moved to Smithtown.

== Political career ==
In 1846, Smith was elected to the New York State Assembly as one of the two representatives of Suffolk County. He served in the Assembly in 1847. He was the Democratic candidate for Speaker that year but lost to Whig William C. Hasbrouck. In 1856, he was elected district attorney of Suffolk County. In 1858, he became county judge. In 1862, he was re-elected county judge and surrogate as a Democrat even while the county went Republican. After his term as judge expired, he returned to his law practice. In the last few years of his life, he was mostly retired from law.

== Personal life ==
Smith was a prominent member of the Episcopal Church in Long Island and served as the first junior warden of the Caroline Church in Setauket. His wife, Sarah Nicoll Clinch, was the niece of Alexander T. Stewart, who adopted her as his daughter and bequeathed her a large fortune. Smith's last public appearance was during the Stewart will contest, where he provided uncomplimentary testimony regarding Henry Hilton's management of Stewart's fortune. He was the largest landowner in the county and possibly its wealthiest, with an estate estimated at a million dollars at the time of his death.

Smith and Sarah had six children: Cornelia (who married lawyer Prescott Hall Butler and resided at By-the-Harbor), Louise Nicoll (who married lawyer Frank Sayre Osborne), Kate Annette (who married Episcopal Reverend Joseph Bloomfield Wetherill), Bessie Springs (who married architect Stanford White and was the mother of architect Lawrence Grant White), Ella Batavia (who married Devereux Emmet), and James Clinch. James was a lawyer and member of Mrs. Astor's 400, who married musician Bertha Ludington Barnes of Chicago. James Clinch Smith witnessed his brother-in-law Stanford White's murder and died on the Titanic. One of Smith's great-grandchildren was lawyer and assemblyman Prescott B. Huntington.

Smith died of pneumonia at his residence in New York City on March 17, 1889. He was buried in the Episcopal Church in St. James.
