= John L. Smith (disambiguation) =

John L. Smith (born 1948) is an American football coach.

John L. Smith may also refer to:

- J. Lawrence Smith (chemist) (1818–1883), American physician & chemist
- J. Lawrence Smith (New York politician) (1816–1889), New York lawyer, assemblyman, district attorney, county judge
- John L. Smith (pharmaceutical executive) (1889–1950), German-born American chemist, pharmaceutical executive, and co-owner of the Brooklyn Dodgers
- John Lee Smith (1894–1963), Lieutenant Governor of Texas
- John Smith (flying ace) (John Lucian Smith, 1914–1972), American fighter pilot
- John Smith (Conservative politician) (Sir John Lindsay Eric Smith, 1923–2007), British politician
- Jack Smith (lawyer) (born c. 1968), formally John L. Smith, American lawyer and special counsel

== See also ==
- John Smith (disambiguation)
