= Woodcrest =

Woodcrest may refer to:

== Places in the United States ==
- Woodcrest, California, a census designated place near Riverside, California
- Woodcrest, Indiana, an unincorporated community
- Woodcrest (Nissequogue, New York), a national historic district located at Nissequogue in Suffolk County, New York
- Woodcrest, New Jersey, an unincorporated area and neighborhood in Cherry Hill, New Jersey
  - Woodcrest Station, a PATCO Speedline station located above
- Woodcrest (Radnor Township, Delaware County, Pennsylvania), a NRHP-listed mansion on the campus of Cabrini College

== Other uses ==
- Woodcrest (microprocessor), code name for a server and workstation variant of the Intel Core microarchitecture processor
- Woodcrest, a fictional suburb in the comic strip The Boondocks
