= 2014 Florida Amendment 2 =

- 4 November 2014
- Use of Marijuana for Certain Medical Conditions
- Outcome: Rejected (failed to meet 60% supermajority required)

Results
Choice	Votes	%
Yes	3,370,761	57.62%
No	2,478,993	42.38%
Valid votes	5,849,754	97.05%
Invalid or blank votes	177,920	2.95%
Total votes	6,027,674	100.00%

Yes
70–80%
60–70%
50–60%
No
60–70%
50–60%

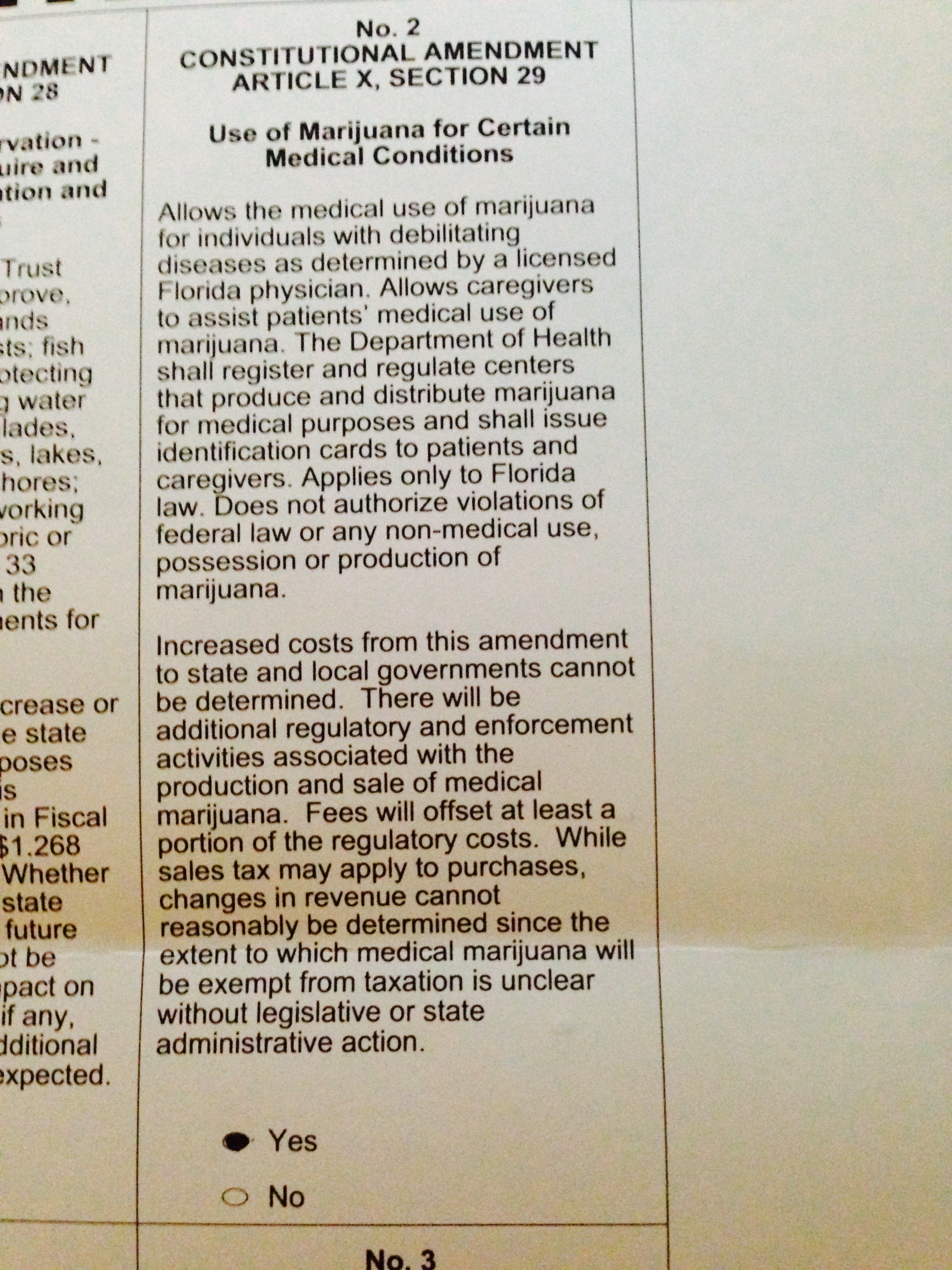
Florida Voters Ballot 2014 - By voters initiative proposed amendment to the Florida Constitution to allow doctors to recommend the use of marijuana for patients and the patients use thereof.

Florida Amendment 2, Use of Marijuana for Certain Medical Conditions, is an initiative that appeared on the November 4, 2014, ballot in the state of Florida as a citizen initiated state constitutional amendment. It received a higher percentage than the 2006 vote which raised the minimum requirement to a 3/5 majority, although it failed to pass.

It was officially certified by the state's secretary of state to appear on the 2014 November ballot and numbered Amendment 2, not to be confused with the 2008 ban on same-sex marriage of the same name. If it had been enacted, the measure would have allowed for the cultivation, purchase, possession and use of medical cannabis to treat certain medical conditions when recommended by a licensed physician. The amendment was introduced by People United for Medical Marijuana on March 26, 2009. As of 2014, twenty-three states and the District of Columbia have already passed legislation allowing doctors to recommend the medicinal use of marijuana thereby legalizing a patient's possession and use. After the amendment failed, in 2016 a similar amendment passed.

== 2014 gubernatorial politics ==
The ballot measure was expected to have a significant impact on the 2014 governor's race, as the state's governor will be elected the same day the measure is voted on and both leading candidates have directly opposing views on the issue. Gubernatorial candidate, former governor, and Morgan & Morgan employee Charlie Crist(D) supported by donating a large sum of his own money to the effort, while the incumbent governor Rick Scott (R) is opposed to it.

Attorney General Pam Bondi led an effort to keep the measure off the ballot, ultimately failing when the state's Supreme Court ruled in favor of the proposed ballot measure. Bondi, backed by Rick Scott, filed suit to prevent the proposed constitutional amendment from appearing on the ballot. This is the third citizen backed initiative to amend the Florida Constitution to allow for the medical use of cannabis however, several "hail-mary passes" which consisted of filing legal challenges with seconds remaining on the clock have successfully kept this matter off the ballot for years. Court documents alleged each year that the proposed amendment failed to meet the rules of statutory construction regarding vagueness and violated the single subject matter rule. A citizens for compassion petition for a proposed amendment to the Florida Constitution on the matter of decriminalizing the medicinal use of cannabis was drafted with a simplified statement using elementary language and petitioners began gathering the requisite minimum number of voter signatures well in advance of the deadline in order to preemptively place the proposed ballot language before the Court anticipating the inevitable legal challenge. Under Florida's Constitution Florida's Supreme Court has ultimate authority and jurisdiction over proposed state constitutional amendment approval. Florida's top court ruled, in a split decision, that the language of the proposed amendment was not unconstitutionally vague nor confusing and the proposed amendment specifically addressed only one subject matter as required under the Florida Constitution and will be placed before the voters. The Court used not so subtle cues by citing the rules of review from an advisory opinion titled "Advisory Op. to Att'y Gen. re Right to Treatment & Rehab. for Non-Violent Drug Offenses", finding, "This Court has traditionally applied a deferential standard of review to the validity of a citizen initiative petition and "has been reluctant to interfere" with "the right of self-determination for all Florida's citizens" to formulate "their own organic law."

== Supporters ==
Kim Russell, founder of People United for Medical Marijuana, said that she began legalization efforts shortly after her father was diagnosed with Parkinson's disease. Some research claims that the drug can help alleviate the symptoms. In response to claims that politics is the motivating factor, Russell says, "It's freedom and it's also compassion." Supporters are widespread and include some notable public figures, the Florida Cannabis Action Network and John Morgan, head of the Morgan & Morgan law firm. Respected members of society have acknowledged the viable need for this legislation even admitting publicly to assisting loved ones to obtain medical marijuana including last sessions Florida State Senate President, Don Gaetz.

== Opposition ==
Opponents include Sheldon Adelson, a Nevada Billionaire who donated $2.5 million to the Drug Free America Foundation, which is a political committee that helped defeat the measure.

== Path to the ballot ==
In order to qualify for the 2014 ballot supporters are required to collect a minimum of 683,149 valid signatures by the petition drive deadline on February 1, 2014.

Supporters reported in August 2013 that they had collected at least 110,000 signatures, enough to trigger a ruling by the Supreme Court of Florida on the measure's constitutionality. Because of the cost of circulating petitions, supporters said they were pausing all petitioning activity until the measure gained the court's approval.

The language in the measure was later approved for the ballot by the Florida Supreme Court on January 27, 2014. Florida Attorney General Pam Bondi had been litigating against the measure in court. An opinion against it was also filed by the Florida Legislature.

A multi-institutional study by Penn Medicine published in JAMA Internal Medicine, supported by the National Institutes of Health (R01DA032110, R25DA023021) and the Center for AIDS Research at the Albert Einstein College of Medicine and Montefiore Medical Center (NIH AI-51519), found that on average, states allowing the medical use of marijuana have lower rates of overdose caused deaths from opioid analgesics, such as OxyContin, Percocet and Vicodin than states without compassionate use medical marijuana laws. Researchers at the Perelman School of Medicine at the University of Pennsylvania reviewed rates of death caused by opioid overdoses between 1999 and 2010. Results of the research reflect that on average, the (then 13) states with laws permitting medical use of cannabis reported an opioid overdose mortality rate at 24.8 percent lower after the compassionate use laws were enacted than those states without compassionate use laws. Implications of the findings may be the best evidence of the claims long made by proponents of medical marijuana use whose previous arguments were largely supported by anecdotal evidence due to the FDA ban inhibiting research. Long term benefits may be even greater where the study revealed that over time the relationship was even more apparent, as deaths attributed to opioid overdose were nearly 20 percent lower in the first year after a state's medical use law was implemented, and opioid overdose deaths continued to decrease to 33.7 percent lower five years after implementation of medicinal use laws. The study provides irrefutable evidence using a discrete data set (state), with a clear variable (with or without medicinal cannabis use), and a measurable mortality rate may provide the proof that cannabis is a safer medication for those patients with chronic pain such as that endured by cancer patients.

A poll conducted by Quinnipiac University and released on July 28, 2014, indicated that 88 percent of Florida's voters favor legalization of medical marijuana.

== Result ==
Amendment 2 failed, receiving 57.6% of the vote. This was short of the 60% supermajority required for constitutional amendments in Florida, although it was higher than the 2006 vote which raised the requirement in the first place.

== See also ==
- 2024 Florida Amendment 3
- Legality of cannabis
