= Beachbend =

Historic house in New York, United States

- U.S. National Register of Historic Places
- U.S. Historic district
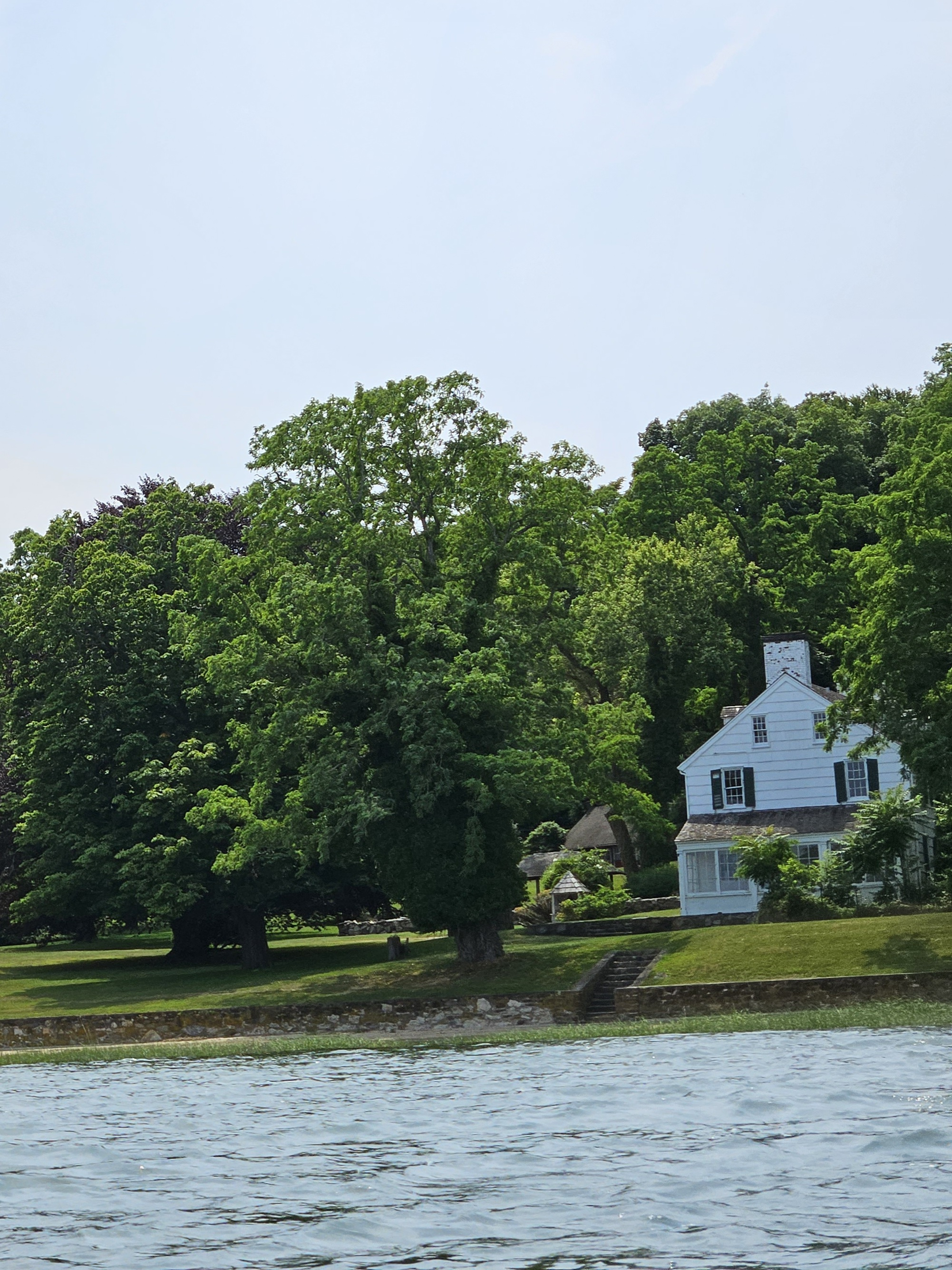
- View of Beachbend Estate from Stonybrook Harbor

- Location within New York Location within the United States
- Location: 32 Smith Ln, Nissequogue, New York
- Coordinates: 40°54′12.98″N 73°10′55.49″W
- Area: 19.4 acres (7.9 ha)
- Built: 1747
- Architectural style: Colonial Revival, Colonial
- MPS: Stony Brook Harbor Estates MPS
- NRHP reference No.: 93000698
- Added to NRHP: August 09, 1993

Beachbend, also known as the William H. Dixon Estate, is a national historic district located at Nissequogue in Suffolk County, New York. The district encompasses an estate with five contributing buildings and two contributing structures. The estate house is a large 18th-century house with alterations completed in 1924. It is a two-story, wood-frame, five-bay structure with a center hall plan. Also on the property are a contributing L-shaped barn, a cottage, a pump house. two sheds, and a well cover.

It was added to the National Register of Historic Places in 1993.
