= James W. and Anne Smith Phyfe Estate =

Historic house in New York, United States

- U.S. National Register of Historic Places
- U.S. Historic district
- Location within New York Location within the United States
- Location: 87 Stillwater Rd., Nissequogue, New York
- Coordinates: 40°54′34″N 73°11′4″W
- Area: 6.3 acres (2.5 ha)
- Built: 1904
- Architect: Green, Isaac H., Jr.
- Architectural style: Late 19th And 20th Century Revivals
- MPS: Stony Brook Harbor Estates MPS
- NRHP reference No.: 93000704
- Added to NRHP: August 9, 1993

James W. and Anne Smith Phyfe Estate is a national historic district located at Nissequogue in Suffolk County, New York. The district encompasses an estate with two contributing buildings. The estate house is a large two-story Neoclassical style structure built in 1904. It features a colossal attic pediment carried on two-story Ionic order columns enclosing a cantilevered balcony on the second floor. Located nearby is a contributing carriage house.

It was added to the National Register of Historic Places in 1993.
