= 2016 Florida Amendment 2 =

Ballot measure legalizing medical marijuana

- November 8, 2016
- Use of Marijuana for Debilitating Medical Conditions
- Outcome: Approved

Results
Choice	Votes	%
Yes	6,518,919	71.32%
No	2,621,845	28.68%
Valid votes	9,140,764	95.41%
Invalid or blank votes	439,725	4.59%
Total votes	9,580,489	100.00%
Registered voters/turnout	12,959,185	73.93%
County results
Yes
80–90%
70–80%
60–70%
50–60%

The Florida Medical Marijuana Legalization Initiative, also known as Amendment 2, was approved by voters in the Tuesday, November 8, 2016, general election in the State of Florida. The bill required a super-majority vote to pass, with at least 60% of voters voting for support of a state constitutional amendment. Florida already had a medical marijuana law in place, but only for those who are terminally ill and with less than a year left to live. The goal of Amendment 2 is to alleviate those suffering from these medical conditions: cancer, epilepsy, glaucoma, positive status for human immunodeficiency virus (HIV), acquired immune deficiency syndrome (AIDS), post-traumatic stress disorder (PTSD), amyotrophic lateral sclerosis (ALS), Crohn's disease, Parkinson's disease, multiple sclerosis, chronic nonmalignant pain caused by a qualifying medical condition or that originates from a qualified medical condition or other debilitating medical conditions comparable to those listed. Under Amendment 2, the medical marijuana will be given to the patient if the physician believes that the medical use of marijuana would likely outweigh the potential health risks for a patient. Smoking the medication was not allowed under a statute passed by the Florida State Legislature, however this ban was struck down by Leon County Circuit Court Judge Karen Gievers on May 25, 2018.

In 2016, measures to legalize recreational marijuana appeared on the ballot in five states: California, Nevada, Arizona, Maine, and Massachusetts. Four more states, including Florida, Arkansas, North Dakota and Montana, considered initiatives to legalize medical marijuana, a move that some say is a first-step towards full legalization.

== Implementation ==
The spokeswoman for the Florida Department of Health, Mara Gambineri, stated that the agency would follow the will of the voters when the constitutional amendment went into effect January 3, 2017. Before January 3, 2017, the medical marijuana available to patients contained low THC. Cannabis of any THC content was available to newly qualified patients after July 1, 2017.

According to a June 15, 2017, article reported by the National Organization for the Reform of Marijuana Laws (NORML), members of the Florida House and Senate have approved legislation to implement Amendment 2 on the final day of a special legislative session and Governor Rick Scott signed the bill into law. The measure prohibits patients from inhaling herbal preparations of cannabis, among other restrictions that proponents say violate the initiative's original intent. Orlando attorney John Morgan, and chairman for United For Care, a non-profit group for the legalization of medical marijuana, has said that he intends to sue the state over the proposed changes.

Under the law, patients diagnosed with cancer, epilepsy, glaucoma, HIV/AIDS, PTSD, ALS, Crohn's disease, Parkinson's disease, multiple sclerosis, or who suffer from chronic pain related to any of these diseases are eligible to receive a 70-day supply of cannabis-infused oils or edible products only. On June 24, the law became effective and it includes eliminating the initial 90-day waiting period for the use of medical marijuana and added chronic nonmalignant pain as a qualifying condition.

Some Florida cities, including Boca Raton, Coral Gables, Delray Beach, the Village of Golf and Homestead, have banned medical marijuana dispensaries since it is illegal under federal law.

== Criticisms of implementation ==
Cannabis activists and critics are concerned that the new law is not being implemented as outlined in Amendment 2, and not following the will of the voters who passed the constitutional amendment. Critics have expressed objections that Florida state regulators in Tallahassee, and at the Florida Department of Health who oversee the rules-making process for the use, distribution, licensing assignment for dispensaries and cultivators of cannabis, are playing favor to a limited number of medical marijuana dispensaries and cultivators who have ties to Florida legislators. The applicants were ranked in a secretive process by a board appointed directly by Governor Rick Scott. Initial analysis of various applications shows a strong bias in some regions towards the winners, despite them not being qualified in cannabis cultivation, science, medicine or growing plants meant for human consumption.

Critics assert that barriers to entry into the market would be constructed to keep out small businesses, people of color, woman ownership, and only allow wealthy white males that are politically connected to participate. Critics and cannabis activists suggest this would disrupt the medical cannabis program and not allow a free market to thrive where diversity is allowed, advocates can educate the public, small businesses can participate, and winners and losers are decided by the free market system.

Another concern from advocates is a vertical market that will be created that limits the numbers of dispensaries and cultivators of cannabis within the state leading to prices being potentially too high for many cannabis patients in Florida. According to Ben Pollara, campaign chairman of the political committee that backed the constitutional amendment stated that "it not only maintains, but strengthens the cartel system of licensed marijuana growers in Florida and that prices will be high, quality will be low, choices will be few, and patients will be driven to the black market".

On July 9, 2019, Florida's First District Court of Appeal issued a major ruling declaring the mandatory vertical integration and license caps unconstitutional.

== Legal actions ==
Smoking ban

Florida Legislature passed, and Governor Rick Scott signed, a provision that defines "medical use" to exclude "possession, use or administration of marijuana in a form for smoking." Arguing that Florida state legislators violated voters' intent when they prohibited smoking for the medical use of marijuana, John Morgan, the Orlando trial lawyer who spearheaded and financed the successful campaign to make medical access to cannabis a constitutional right, filed a lawsuit in Leon County Circuit Court on July 6, 2017, asking the court to declare the law implementing the 2016 constitutional amendment unenforceable.

"Inhalation is a medically effective and efficient way to deliver Tetrahydrocannabinol [THC], and other cannabinoids, to the bloodstream. By redefining the constitutionally defined term 'medical use' to exclude smoking, the Legislature substitutes its medical judgment for that of 'a licensed Florida physician' and is in direct conflict with the specifically articulated Constitutional process," the lawsuit states.

Morgan's lawsuit claimed that provision "redefined and narrowed the definition of marijuana in direct conflict" with the Constitution.

Deputy Solicitor General Denise Harle argues that "the plain language of the Amendment refutes" Morgan's case. Mills responded to Harle that the amendment itself "places no limitation on the use of marijuana in a form for smoking," calling the ban a "direct irreconcilable conflict." Saying that the amendment doesn't overtly address smoking "misses the point," he added that banning it "takes discretion out of the hands of patients and physicians."

Circuit Judge Karen Gievers scheduled a January 25, 2018, hearing on the state's motion to dismiss. On January 26, 2018, the judge refused to grant the state's motion to dismiss the case and will allow the case to proceed.

"The pending complaint contains sufficient allegations to meet the standing and active case or controversy criteria for the court to have jurisdiction over this declaratory judgment action," Gievers wrote in the court order.

The judge set a one-day trial for May 16, 2018, in the legal effort to overturn the state's ban on smoking medical marijuana.

On May 25, 2018, Judge Karen Gievers ruled the state law banning patients from smoking medical marijuana unconstitutional. Gievers found that the constitutional amendment approved by voters in 2016 which broadly legalized medical marijuana gives eligible patients the right to smoke the medical marijuana in private.

The law banning smoking of medical marijuana "is invalid because it conflicts with the Florida Constitution and prohibits a use of medical marijuana that is permitted by the amendment: smoking in private," Gievers wrote in a 22-page order.

Gievers also found that the language in the amendment "recognizes there is no right to smoke in public places, thereby implicitly recognizing the appropriateness of using smokable medical marijuana in private places consistent with the amendment."

The Florida Department of Health said the state is expected to appeal, which likely would place Gievers' order legalizing the smoking of medical marijuana on temporary hold.

On June 5, 2018, the judge lifted the ban on smoking cannabis in Florida, giving the state until June 11, 2018, to put a plan together. Gievers said the state's ban caused irreparable harm to patients who could not get the treatment recommended for them.

"The automatic stay will prolong the period that Ms. Jordan, Ms. Dodson and all Floridians like them with debilitating medical conditions who would benefit from smokable medical marijuana are unable to receive the best available treatment for them," the motion said. "Without any corresponding benefit to the defendants (the Department of Health), the automatic stay increases the pain and suffering of the individual plaintiffs and denies them access to a constitutionally permitted medical treatment. This is the irreparable harm that plaintiffs will suffer if the automatic stay is permitted to remain in effect."

Florida House ends ban on smoking medical marijuana

Without much debate and two days before Florida Governor Ron DeSantis’ deadline on March 15, 2019, the bill to repeal a ban on smoking medical marijuana finally rolled onto the governor’s desk.

The Florida House affirmed the right to smoke medical marijuana March 13, 2019, approving the Senate bill to include “smoking” to the language in the medical marijuana constitutional amendment. Instead of submitting House Bill 7015, Rep. Ray Rodrigues substituted it with Senate Bill (SB)182, which the Senate had approved last week in a 34–4 vote.

SB 182, sponsored by Sen. Jeff Brandes of St. Petersburg, allows a 35-day supply of marijuana in “a form for smoking” not to exceed 2.5 ounces or, for a physician recommendation of up to 4 ounces.

The primary difference between HB 7015 and SB 182 is the House bill allowed only pre-rolled marijuana cigarettes while the Senate version would require marijuana operators to sell at least one type of pre-rolled marijuana cigarette and other whole-flower products, and allows patients to buy smoking-related equipment at retail outlets, such as smoke shops.

Senate Bill 182 bans smoking in public or at private businesses subject to the state's cigarette smoking ban.

Medical marijuana flower buds and pre-rolled marijuana cigarettes could be available in licensed dispensaries by mid-summer of 2019 when DeSantis, who has affirmed his position against the smoking ban stating that he will sign the bill.

“I am very confident that the governor will sign it,” House Speaker José R. Oliva stated.

Governor Ron DeSantis signed SB-182 into law on March 18, 2019, officially legalizing smokable medical marijuana. SB-182, Medical Use of Marijuana act, redefines the term "medical use" to include the possession, use and administration of marijuana in a form for smoking.

=== Unconstitutional restrictions on licensing ===
A separate lawsuit was filed in December 2017 by Florigrown LLC alleging that the mandatory vertical licensing scheme required by the “implementing” statute passed by the legislature is unconstitutional.

In late 2018, Leon County Circuit Court Judge Charles Dodson entered a temporary injunction barring the state from continuing to implement the statute based on finding that it unconstitutionally limited the provisions of the Amendment by mandating vertical integration and severely limiting the number of licenses available to participate in the medical marijuana industry. Various commentators labeled the select few businesses that were able to obtain one of the coveted licenses a “cartel.” The successful legal challenge was led by lawyers Ari H. Gerstin and Jonathan S. Robbins of Akerman LLP.

On July 9, 2019, Florida's First District Court of Appeal affirmed the circuit court's finding of unconstitutionality and barred the state from continuing to implement the unconstitutional statute.

In an interview, Florigrown CEO Adam Elend called the ruling a “game-changer.”

“It drops a bomb on the current licensing scheme. It’s just changing the whole regime,” Elend said. “People are not getting medicine. The dispensaries are out of stock all the time. The products are limited, and the prices are high. That’s what happens in an oligopoly and that’s what we have.”

== Key differences from 2014 proposal ==
The initiative improved on four key issues from the 2014 proposal.

- Doctors are required to receive parental consent from minors: "In order for a physician certification to be issued to a minor, a parent or legal guardian of the minor must consent in writing."
- The chronic illness that allows a patient to receive the medical marijuana is better spelled out, as stating "same kind or class as or comparable to" when defining specific illnesses.
- This bill does not repeal any law that defends "negligence or professional malpractice on the part of a qualified patient, caregiver, physician, MMTC (Medical Marijuana Treatment Center), or its agents or employees."
- Additional clauses were added to close the "drug-dealer loophole" in that MMTC's may be limited to how many qualified patients they treat a year.

== Financial backers ==
Funding for Amendment 2 came from various political action committees, including a $1 million contribution came from Washington, D.C.–based, pro-marijuana legalization New Approach PAC. Additional funds were primarily backed by The People for Medical Marijuana PAC, also known as United for Care, who is the bill's sponsor. As of November 2016, they have provided over $12.5 million towards the amendment. The United for Care committee is chaired by Orlando trial lawyer John Morgan, who has largely bankrolled the Florida medical marijuana effort by contributing at least $6.5 million towards the initiative, and $326,438 in November, 2016.

== Opposition ==
Las Vegas casino magnate Sheldon Adelson donated $500,000 towards the effort to thwart the bill, including a contribution of $1 million to the Drug-Free Florida Committee, who also fought the initiative. Adelson, whose son died of a drug overdose, committed $5.5 million to help defeat the medical marijuana Amendment 2 in 2014.

Carol Jenkins Barnett, daughter of George W. Jenkins, founder of Publix Super Markets, also gave $800,000 to the Drug-Free Florida Committee.

Former Florida Supreme Court justices rallied together to produce an Op-Ed for the Tampa Bay Times in opposition to the new initiative, stating, "medical marijuana will be too easy for doctors to prescribe", and, "it'd be a wide open door for marijuana regardless of its need as a compassionate, alternative treatment option." Additionally, their letter contends that marijuana will be sold at "pot shops" and that there would be more pot shops than 7-11's, McDonald's, and Starbucks combined. Lastly, they stated that there's a right to privacy clause in the bill that would enable criminals to discreetly create "a new pipeline for pot [to get] into high schools throughout Florida."

Leaders of the City of Apopka voted unanimously to ban medical marijuana until May 31, 2017. Charlotte County has already placed a 9-month prohibition of the amendment taking place, and the commissioners stated that they fear they'll be sued by the federal government as cannabis currently remains on the Schedule 1 list, among the most dangerous drugs. The Charlotte County Sheriff, Bill Prummel, has been vocal in his opposition to medical marijuana because of his fears that "we will trade our pill mills for pot shops," referring to the Florida clinics that loosely issued prescription painkillers throughout the state and causing an addiction epidemic, until Florida attorney general Pam Bondi issued legislation to shut them down in 2011. Sheriff Prummel is Chair of the Charlotte Drug-Free Florida committee. The State committee, Drug-Free Florida, spent $704,389 in the weeks before the general election by producing television ads declaring, "marijuana has no medicinal purposes."

== Endorsements ==
News Agencies	Organizations	Political Figures
88.5 WMNF; The Miami Herald; The Palm Beach Post; Sun-Sentinel; Florida Today; Herald-Tribune; Tallahassee Democrat; The Gainesville Sun; Ocala StarBanner	AFL-CIO; AFSME; America Votes; American Civil Liberties Union of Florida; Annie Appleseed Project; Democratic Women's Club of Florida; Florida Alliance of Planned Parenthood; Florida Democratic Party; Florida NAACP; Kendall Federation Political Action Committee; Medical Marijuana of South Florida; Miami Dade Young Dems; New College of Florida Democrats; NORML; Palm Beach County Democratic Black Caucus; Planned Parenthood; Progress Florida; Ruth's List; SEIU Florida; Teamsters 2011; United Teachers of Dade	State senator Oscar Braynon, II; U.S. representative Corrine Brown; State senator Dwight Bullard; Former state senator Paula Dockery; U.S. representative Joe Garcia; U.S. representative Alcee Hastings; Former state senator Tony Hill; State representative Cynthia Stafford; Libertarian Party activist David Leavitt

== Path to the ballot ==
Following the failure of the 2014 initiative by the same name, on December 17, 2015, the Florida Supreme Court concluded that the People for United Medical Marijuana's sponsorship of Amendment 2 satisfied the court's requirements.

Sponsored again by United for Care, they received the following petition signatures for the initiative to begin and appear on the primary, per election requirements:

Required for review by Attorney General:	68,314
Required to have initiative on the ballot:	683,149
Number currently valid:	716,270*

In the weeks prior to the general election date, Broward County election officials omitted Amendment 2 from some of the mail in ballots, prompting a lawsuit from NORML, a pro marijuana legalization firm. Following two emergency hearings, the 17th Judicial Circuit Court judge, Carol-Lisa Phillips, ruled that "there is no evidence of irreparable harm in the case." She continued, "because both of the voters who had confirmed instances of faulty vote-by-mail ballots already received replacement ballots," and no further action has been taken against the election officials.

The amendment passed during the general election on November 8, 2016, with a supermajority vote of 71.32%. That percentage equated to 6,518,919 total votes in favor of the amendment.

== Economic impact ==
According to research from the company New Frontier Data, the market growth is expected to be $1.6 billion a year by 2020 due to the state's percentage of the elderly and because it is the third most populous state in America.

== See also ==
- 2024 Florida Amendment 3
- Timeline of cannabis laws in the United States
- Legal history of cannabis in the United States
- List of 2016 United States cannabis reform proposals
