= Rassapeague =

Historic house in New York, United States

- U.S. National Register of Historic Places
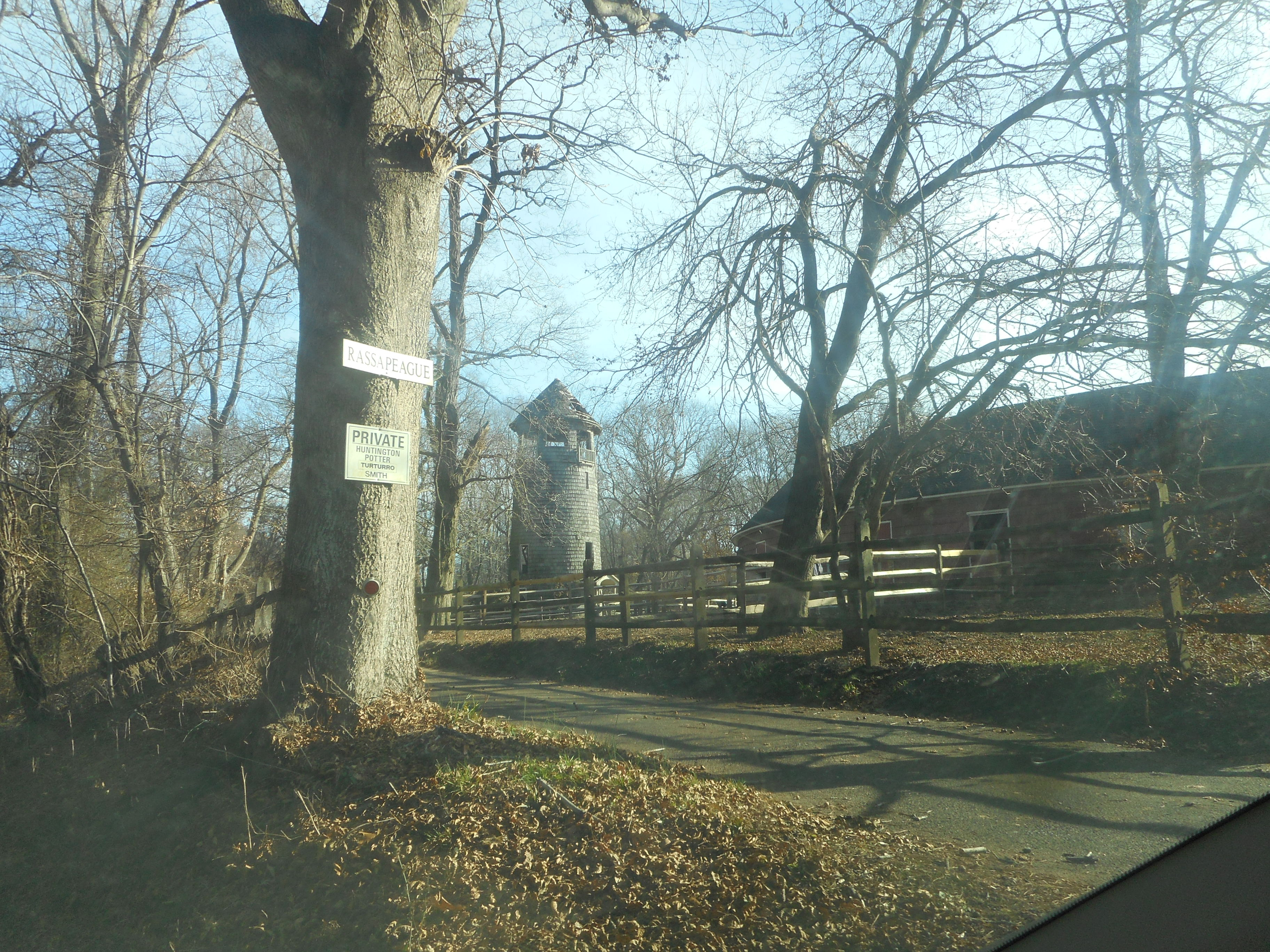
- Private driveway that once lead to Rassapeague, as seen in November 2019.

- Location within New York Location within the United States
- Location: Long Beach Rd., S side, Nissequogue, New York
- Coordinates: 40°54′58″N 73°10′55″W
- Area: 20.3 acres (8.2 ha)
- Built: 1865
- Architect: Ford, Butler, and Oliver
- Architectural style: Colonial Revival, Late Victorian, Italianate
- MPS: Stony Brook Harbor Estates MPS
- NRHP reference No.: 93000705
- Added to NRHP: August 9, 1993

Rassapeague, also known as the Francis C. Huntington and Susan Butler Huntington Estate, is a historic home located at Nissequogue in Suffolk County, New York. The estate house was built about 1865 and is a large Italianate house with additions completed in 1915. It is a two-story, wood frame, clapboarded dwelling with a large back service wing and porch. Also on the property are a "wine cellar," barn, and cottage.

It was added to the National Register of Historic Places in 1993.

On December 30, 2011, at approximately 5am, A fire broke out between the second floor and the attic. Firefighters battled the flames for almost ten hours, but were hampered with water supply issues stemming from the nearest fire hydrant being over 3000 ft away. Fire eventually engulfed the entire attic and most of the second floor causing major structural collapses. Due to the insatiability of the structure the building had to be razed.
