= East Farm (Head of the Harbor, New York) =

- U.S. National Register of Historic Places
- U.S. Historic district
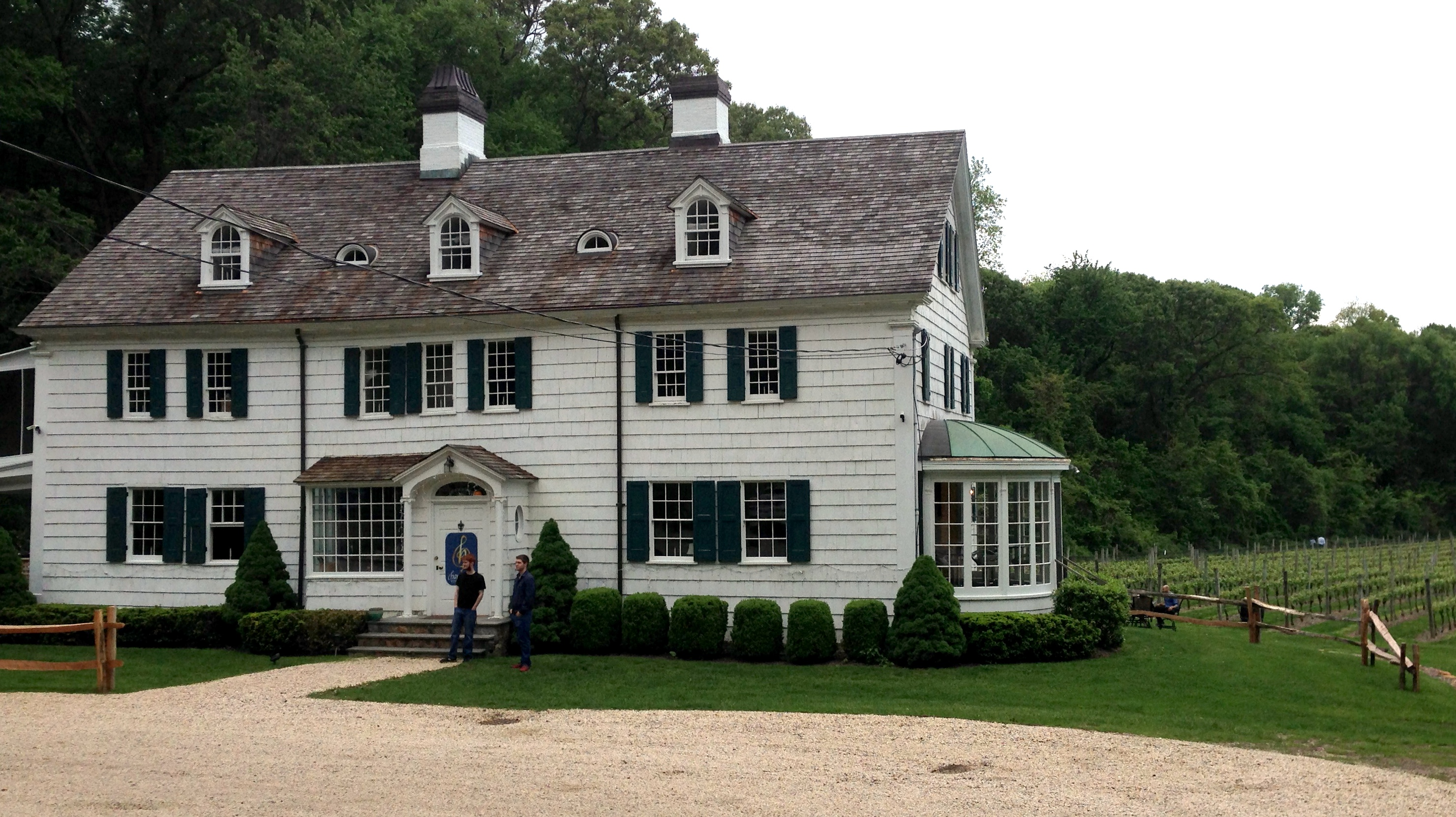
- The c. 1690 farmhouse, currently used as a winery tasting room

- Location within New York Location within the United States
- Location: Harbor Rd., N side, at Shep Jones Ln., Head of the Harbor, New York
- Coordinates: 40°54′48″N 73°9′17″W
- Area: 31 acres (13 ha)
- Built: 1710
- Architect: Archibald M. Brown
- Architectural style: Colonial
- MPS: Stony Brook Harbor Estates MPS
- NRHP reference No.: 93000700
- Added to NRHP: August 9, 1993

East Farm, also known as the Archibald M. Brown Estate, is a national historic district located at Head of the Harbor in Suffolk County, New York. The district encompasses an estate with seven contributing buildings and one contributing site. The first buildings on the farm went up in 1689. The estate house was originally built in the 18th century about 1690 and as the Smith family farmhouse, then greatly enlarged by its architect-owner in 1910. It is a wood framed, clapboarded structure with a wood shingle roof, and Colonial in style. Also on the property are a contributing barn with shed, milk house, two cottages, and barn and garage complex. The estate also retains an intact formal garden.

It was added to the National Register of Historic Places in 1993.
