= Land of Clover =

Historic house in New York, United States

- U.S. National Register of Historic Places
- U.S. Historic district
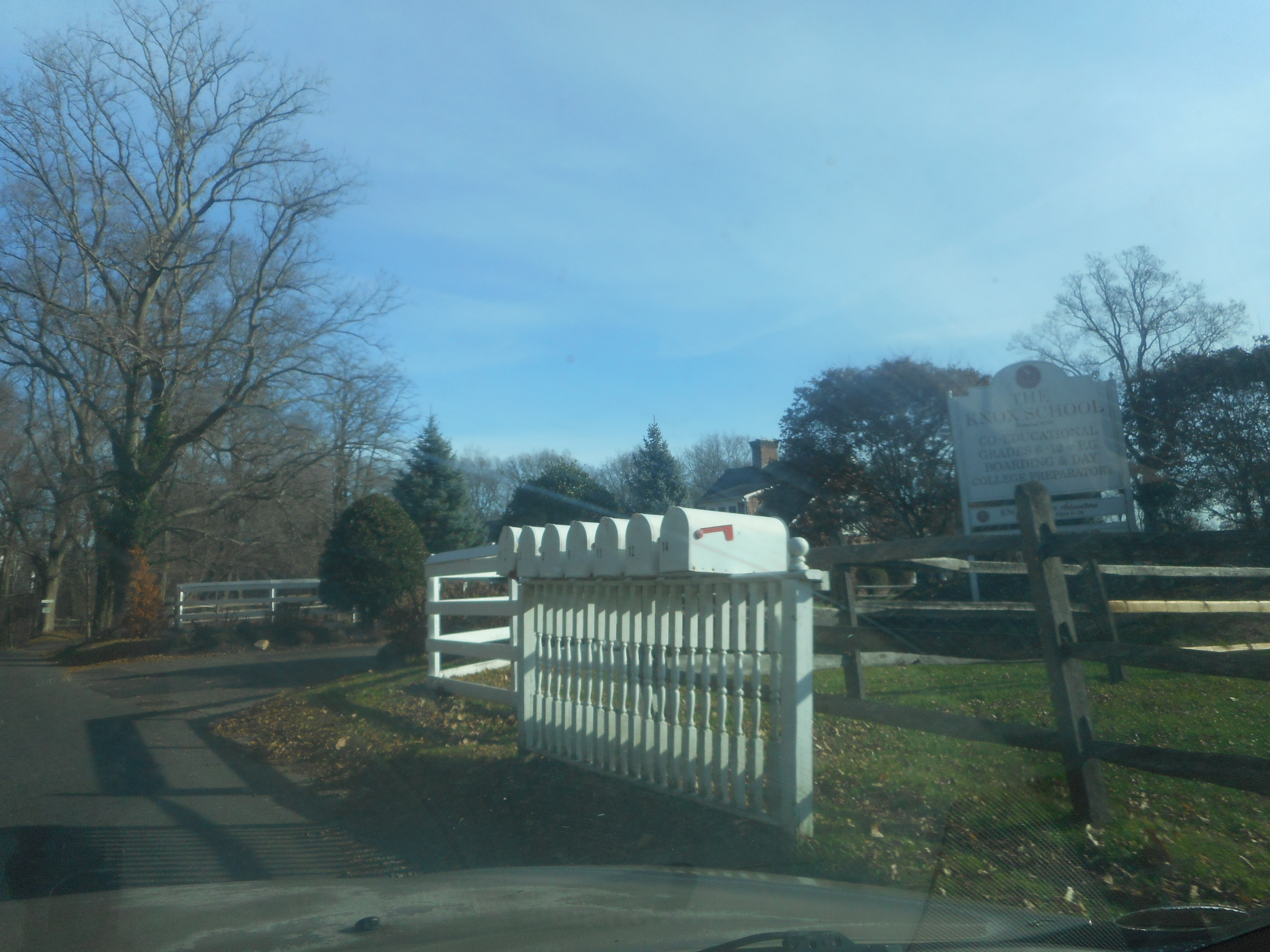
- The "Land of Clover" the site of The Knox School since 1954.

- Location within New York Location within the United States
- Location: Long Beach Rd., S side, Nissequogue, New York
- Coordinates: 40°54′48″N 73°11′12″W
- Area: 56.7 acres (22.9 ha)
- Built: 1912
- Architect: Archibald Brown
- Architectural style: Late 19th And 20th Century Revivals
- MPS: Stony Brook Harbor Estates MPS
- NRHP reference No.: 93000702
- Added to NRHP: August 9, 1993

Land of Clover, also known as the Lathrop Brown Estate, is a national historic district located at Nissequogue in Suffolk County, New York. The district encompasses an estate with six contributing buildings and one contributing structure. The estate house is a large two-story brick Georgian Revival structure built between 1912 and 1918. It is loosely patterned after Westover Plantation. Also on the property are a contributing horseshoe stable, superintendent's cottage, ice house and garage, U-shaped barn, small barn and a water tower. It is now a boarding school known as The Knox School. The Estate house is currently known as Houghton Hall. It was added to the National Register of Historic Places in 1993.
