= John Morgan (lawyer) =

American lawyer (born 1956)

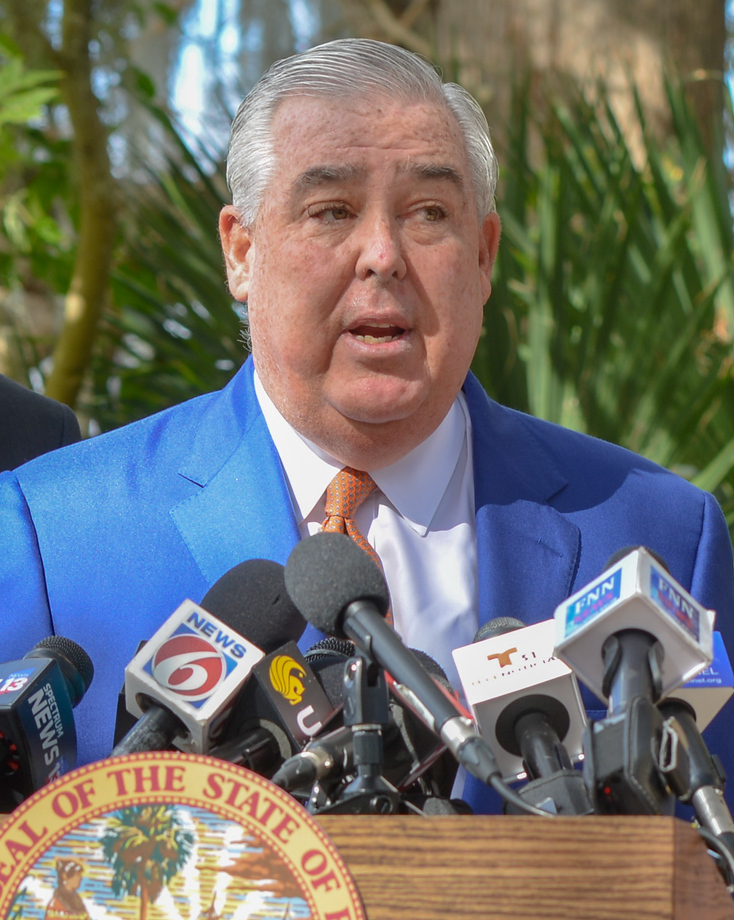
- Morgan in 2019

Founder and de facto leader of the Common Ground Party
- Incumbent
- Assumed office June 25, 2026
- Preceded by: Party founded

Personal details
- Born: John Bryan Morgan; March 31, 1956 (age 70) Lexington, Kentucky, US
- Party: Common Ground Party (2026–present); Independent (2017–2026); Democratic (before 2017)
- Education: University of Florida (BA, JD)

John Bryan Morgan (born March 31, 1956) is an American attorney and political figure based in Florida, best known as founder of personal injury law firm Morgan & Morgan. He is the founder of the centrist Common Ground Party, which he launched in June 2026.

Politico has described Morgan as "the godfather of Florida's medical marijuana amendment and a former Democratic fundraiser."

== Early life and education ==
Morgan was born on March 31, 1956, in Lexington, Kentucky. He is the eldest of five children, to Ramon Morgan and Patricia Morgan. When Morgan was fourteen years old, his family moved to Winter Park, Florida. Morgan began working in various jobs at an early age, as his family struggled financially. In 1974, he entered the University of Florida, where he earned a bachelor's degree in arts in 1978. He took an 18-month hiatus selling ads to pay for his studies at the University of Florida Levin College of Law. He received his Juris Doctor in 1982. While in college, he was elected president of the Florida Blue Key society.

== Career ==
=== Early legal career ===
After graduating from law school in 1982, Morgan began his legal career at the law firm of Billings, Morgan (no relation) and Cunningham in Orlando. He left in 1985 to co-found the law firm Griffin, Morgan & Linder, a partnership that lasted three more years. According to Florida Trend, the partners differed in their views on marketing, in particular, Morgan insisted on advertising on television, which at the time was a controversial practice for lawyers.

=== Morgan & Morgan ===
From 1988 to 2005, Morgan was a founding partner at Morgan, Colling & Gilbert. In 1989, the law firm began advertising aggressively, specifically on television and radio, which drew criticism from the legal community. The firm also recruited other top young lawyers from different law firms. By the early 2000s, the firm expanded throughout Florida with 420 employees, and by 2013 the company had 260 attorneys among 1,800 staffers in Florida, Georgia, Mississippi, Kentucky, and New York City.

In 2005, Morgan bought out his partners' share of the company and renamed the firm Morgan & Morgan, also adding his wife Ultima as partner. Three of his children joined the law firm.

The firm bills itself as "America's Largest Injury Law Firm". Morgan & Morgan is headquartered in Orlando. As of 2022, the law firm had over 3,000 employees, including 800 lawyers, in 49 states. In 2018, the firm received over two million phone calls and signed up 500 new cases each day. That year, the firm collected $1.5 billion in settlements and spent $130 million nationwide on advertising. Morgan was one of the first lawyers to advertise in phone books and television commercials.

In 2021, Morgan's law firm fired half of its marketing department. This staffing purge came in the wake of a controversial Morgan & Morgan national advertising campaign, "Size Matters", which was meant to convey the large scale of the firm, but was criticized as an inappropriate dick joke. The staffers who were terminated had criticized the campaign's phallic implications. The firm stated that no one was fired specifically because of the controversy surrounding the ad.

Morgan & Morgan has been involved in a number of notable legal cases, including the Daytona Beach Rollercoaster Incident, the Tampa Walgreens Sexual Harassment case, a twenty-two million dollar case against Healogics Inc., a major lawsuit against R.J. Reynolds Tobacco Company in 2018, and a class action lawsuit against a data broker, Exactis, over a data breach.

In August 2022, Morgan starred in his firm commercial using the metaverse.

== Politics ==
Morgan is a former prominent donor to the Democratic Party. He served as former President Bill Clinton's state finance chairman. Morgan has described himself as a "Fiscally conservative and socially compassionate" Democrat and a big backer of the Demings political family.

He stated in November 2016 that he was considering running for Governor of Florida in the 2018 election. On November 24, 2017, he announced on Twitter that he was disillusioned with the current state of American politics and was leaving the Democratic Party to register as an independent. He also criticized the Democratic National Committee for supporting Hillary Clinton before the Democratic primary was over in 2016.

Morgan has been an advisor and fundraiser for Bill Clinton, Barack Obama, Hillary Clinton, and Nancy Pelosi.

Morgan donated to Hillary Clinton's 2016 presidential campaign. Morgan gave $355,000 to the Biden Victory Fund in August 2020. Morgan is close to Joe Biden's younger brother, Frank Biden. Morgan flew Frank Biden to Joe Biden's inauguration in his private jet. Morgan said he talked to Frank Biden about job opportunities at Morgan & Morgan.

In January 2024, Morgan mentioned the possibility of running as a centrist independent candidate in Florida's 2026 gubernatorial election. During an interview Politico in December 2024, Morgan said that he would run under the "Capitalist Party" if he runs for governor in 2026 and would support the legalization of marijuana and prostitution, oppose allowing transgender students to play in sports that match their gender identity, and described himself as being anti-monopoly.

On April 13, 2026, Morgan announced on an X post that he would not run for governor. In the announcement, he said he would still go forward with creating a new political party and announced a $100,000 contest to make a name for the party.

=== Medical cannabis legalization ===
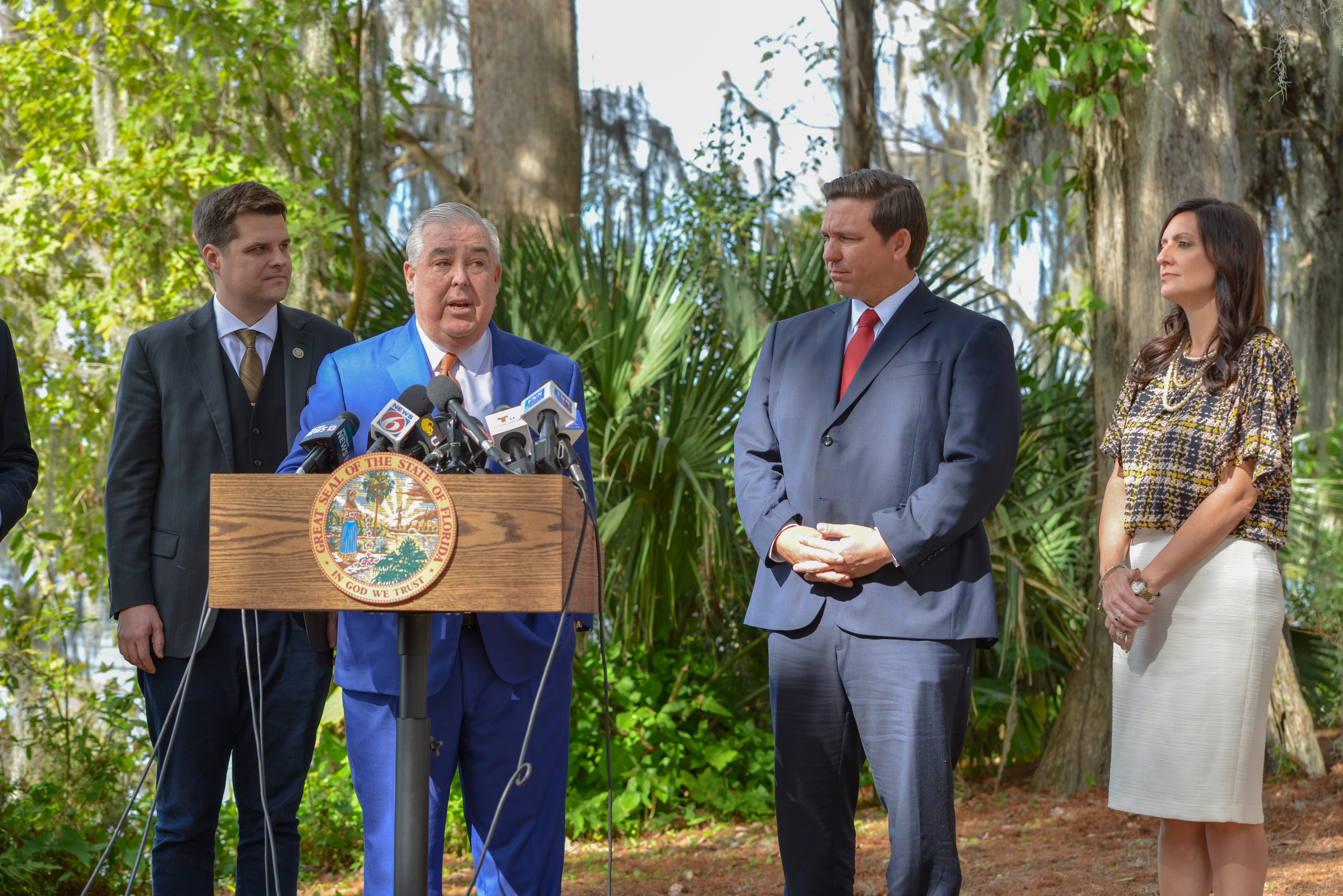
Morgan speaking alongside Governor Ron DeSantis, Lieutenant Governor Jeanette Nuñez, and Congressman Matt Gaetz during the announcement of the legalization of medical cannabis in Florida, 2019

Motivated by his younger brother Tim Morgan's paralysis and struggle with cancer, Morgan has been involved in efforts to legalize medical cannabis in Florida since 2013. Medical cannabis appeared as 2016 Florida Amendment 2 on the November 2016 ballot. Morgan contributed to the "yes" efforts by donating $6.5 million along with television and radio advertisements personally supporting the measure.

Morgan organized the United for Care campaign and was involved in revising the language of Amendment 2. Medical use of cannabis in Florida was legalized in 2016 by way of a constitutional amendment. Appearing on the ballot as Amendment 2, the initiative was approved with 71% of the vote. Morgan and Jimmy Buffett were partners in a medical cannabis company called "Coral Reefer".

=== 2020 Florida Amendment 2 ===
Morgan & Morgan contributed $1.5 million toward a proposed Florida constitutional amendment to raise the hourly minimum wage to $15. In particular, he pledged to spend $1 million to raise Florida's minimum wage to $15. Morgan & Morgan was a major donor to the political committee Florida for a Fair Wage, donating the bulk of the $4.15 million raised by the campaign. In October 2019, Morgan announced that he had acquired enough signatures to get the minimum wage amendment on the ballot in November 2020. The amendment passed on November 3, 2020, via a statewide referendum concurrent with other elections. The amendment sets to increase the state's hourly minimum wage to $15 by 2026.

Orlando Weekly reported that some employees at Morgan & Morgan made less than $15 per hour. When questioned by Orlando Weekly, Morgan replied by saying "I can tell what angle you're getting at with this story, and it's bullshit," saying that many of his call center employees start out with a $25,000 annual salary (an hourly wage of $15 an hour is equal to roughly $31,200 a year). Morgan said the turnover rate for employees at his call center is very high in the first six months, but those who stick it out make an average of $35,000 a year.

== Personal life ==
Morgan met his wife, Ultima Degnan, while studying law. They were married in May 1982. Morgan and Degnan have four children.

Morgan is Catholic.

== Philanthropy and other ventures ==
He is a real estate investor who has purchased land, hotels, restaurants, and shopping centers. Forbes estimates Morgan and his family are worth at least $1.5 billion.

Morgan and his wife, Ultima Ann Morgan, were among major donors and fundraisers behind the opening of Boys Town Orlando and Annunciation Catholic Academy in Altamonte Springs. In 2013, Morgan and his wife donated $2 million to the Second Harvest Food Bank of Central Florida. In 2015, the Morgans pledged $1 million toward a $7.4 million Harbor House domestic abuse shelter. Among other donations are $1 million to the UF law school; and $1 million to the homeless aid nonprofit Community Resource Network; $2 million to help build the Second Harvest Food Bank's central warehouse; and $1 million toward a new Harbor House domestic violence shelter.

Morgan is the founder of WonderWorks Attraction, PMP Marketing Group, ClassAction.com, and Abogados.com. He is a partner in the legal software company Litify.

In 2015, the Morgans donated $1 million to Harbor House of Central Florida to support the creation of a domestic violence shelter named the Morgan & Morgan Home - A Safe Haven for Families.

== Bibliography ==
- Morgan, John (2011). You Can't Teach Hungry: Creating the Multimillion-Dollar Law Firm. Portland, Oregon: Trial Guides, LLC. ISBN 9781941007273.
- Morgan, John (2015). You Can't Teach Vision. Trial Guides LLC. ISBN 9781941007389.
- Morgan, John (2026). Life Is Luck: Lessons from a Paperboy and How to Improve Your Luck. Maison Vero. ISBN 9781969508356.
