= Kate Annette Wetherill Estate =

Historic house in New York, United States

- U.S. National Register of Historic Places
- U.S. Historic district
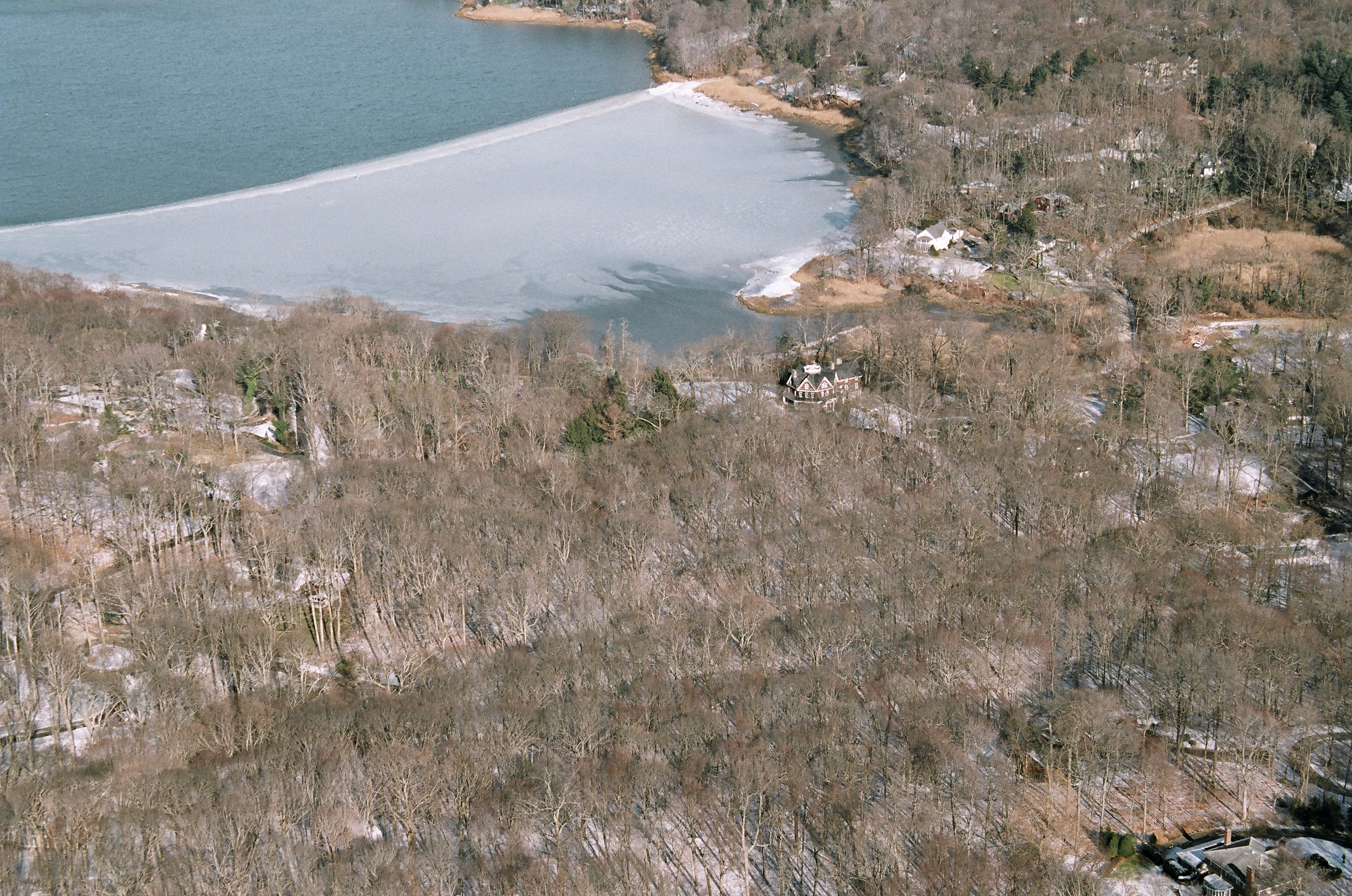
- Aerial view of the Kate Annette Wetherill Estate at the entrance to Stony Brook Harbor in Head of the Harbor, New York.

- Location within New York Location within the United States
- Location: Harbor Hill Rd., S side, Head of the Harbor, New York
- Coordinates: 40°53′32″N 73°10′11″W
- Area: 26.8 acres (10.8 ha)
- Built: 1895
- Architect: White, Stanford
- Architectural style: Colonial Revival
- MPS: Stony Brook Harbor Estates MPS
- NRHP reference No.: 93000708
- Added to NRHP: August 09, 1993

Kate Annette Wetherill Estate is a national historic district located at Head of the Harbor in Suffolk County, New York. The district encompasses an estate with three contributing buildings, two contributing sites, and two contributing structures. The estate house was designed by Stanford White in 1895 in the Colonial Revival style The main block of the house is two stories with a full attic formed of facade gables corresponding to an octagonal form. A large 2 1/2-story, gable-roofed service wing projects to the east. Also on the property is a pump house, rose garden, stone entrance piers with iron gate, carriage barn, and superintendent's cottage. It was added to the National Register of Historic Places in 1993.
