= Shore Cottage (Head of the Harbor, New York) =

Historic house in New York, United States

- U.S. National Register of Historic Places
- U.S. Historic district
- Location within New York Location within the United States
- Location: Harbor Rd., E side, Head of the Harbor, New York
- Coordinates: 40°53′39″N 73°10′23″W
- Area: 1.7 acres (0.69 ha)
- Built: 1913
- Architect: White, Lawrence Grant
- Architectural style: Late 19th And 20th Century Revivals
- MPS: Stony Brook Harbor Estates MPS
- NRHP reference No.: 93000707
- Added to NRHP: August 9, 1993

Shore Cottage, also known as the Lawrence Grant White and Laura Chanler White Estate, is a national historic district located at Head of the Harbor in Suffolk County, New York. The district encompasses an estate with two contributing buildings. The estate house was designed in 1913 and is a 2 1/2-story, rectangular block clad in stucco under a gable slate roof. It was the summer home of the Lawrence Grant White family; he was a son of Stanford White. Also on the property is a contributing barn.

It was added to the National Register of Historic Places in 1993.
