= Harbor House (Nissequogue, New York) =

Historic house in New York, United States

- U.S. National Register of Historic Places
- U.S. Historic district
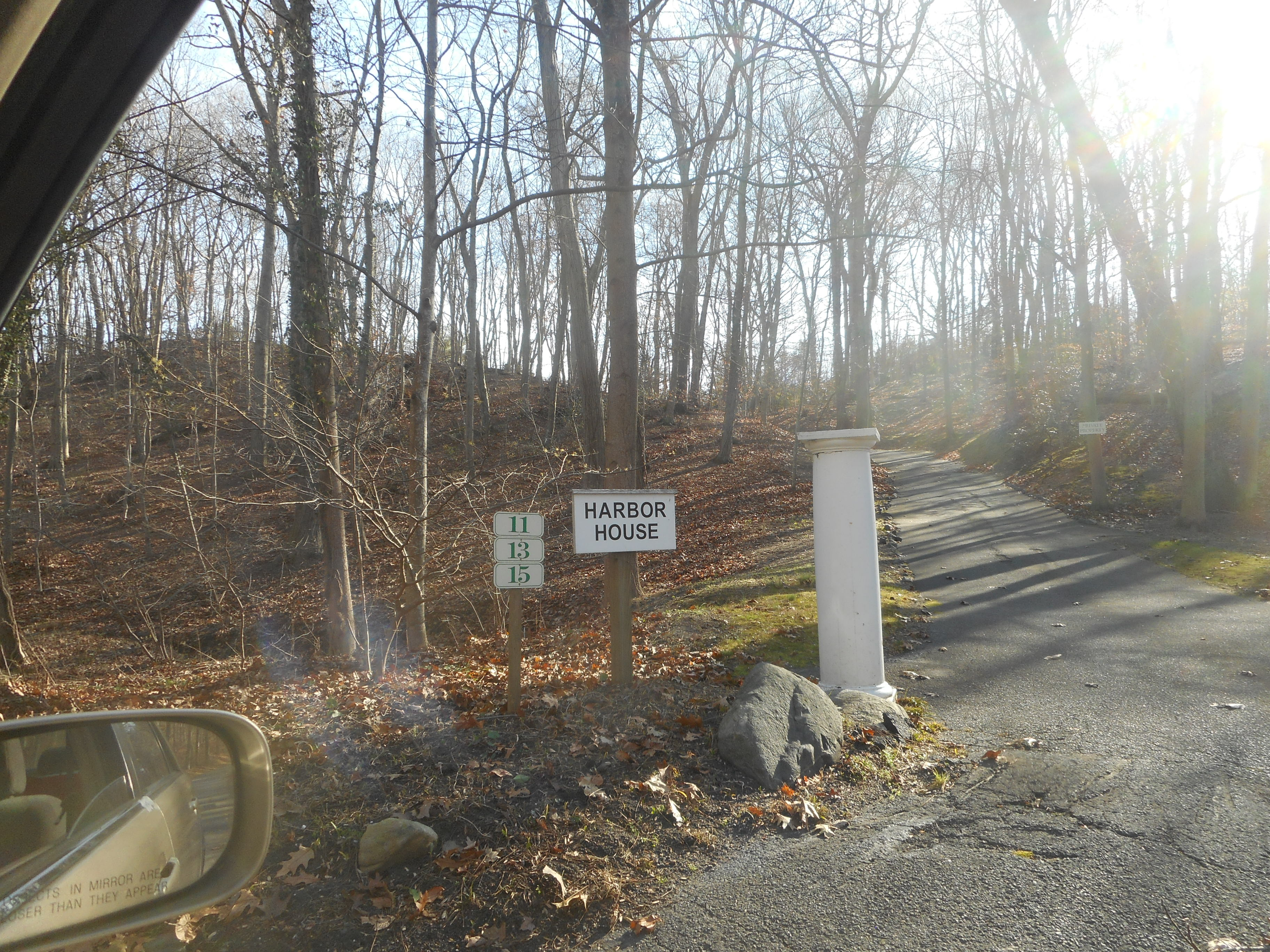
- The private driveway leading to Harbor House off of a one lane road in Nissequogue, New York.

- Location within New York Location within the United States
- Location: Spring Hollow Rd., Nissequogue, New York
- Coordinates: 40°53′48″N 73°10′44″W
- Area: 21.9 acres (8.9 ha)
- Built: 1910
- Architect: Ford, Butler, and Oliver
- Architectural style: Late 19th And 20th Century Revivals
- MPS: Stony Brook Harbor Estates MPS
- NRHP reference No.: 93000701
- Added to NRHP: August 09, 1993

Harbor House, also known as the George C. Case Estate, is a national historic district located at Nissequogue in Suffolk County, New York. The district encompasses an estate with two contributing buildings, one contributing site, and two contributing structures. The estate house is a two story with full attic structure with a gambrel roof designed in 1910. Also on the property are a contributing carriage barn / stable and a well house.

It was added to the National Register of Historic Places in 1993.
