= Woodcrest (Nissequogue, New York) =

Historic house in New York, United States

- U.S. National Register of Historic Places
- U.S. Historic district
- Location within New York Location within the United States
- Location: Moriches Rd., Nissequogue, New York
- Coordinates: 40°54′0″N 73°10′59″W
- Area: 28.9 acres (11.7 ha)
- Built: 1895
- Architects: Green, Isaac H., Jr.
- Architectural style: Shingle Style
- MPS: Stony Brook Harbor Estates MPS
- NRHP reference No.: 93000709
- Added to NRHP: August 9, 1993

Woodcrest, also known as the Homer Reboul Estate, is a national historic district located at Nissequogue in Suffolk County, New York. The district encompasses an estate with two contributing buildings and two contributing structure. The estate house is a large two-story Shingle Style structure, with a gambrel roof and an attached service wing, built in 1895. It is surrounded by formal gardens. Also on the property are a contributing carriage house and pump house.

It was added to the National Register of Historic Places in 1993.
