= Mills Pond District (St. James, New York) =

Historic district in New York, United States

- U.S. National Register of Historic Places
- U.S. Historic district
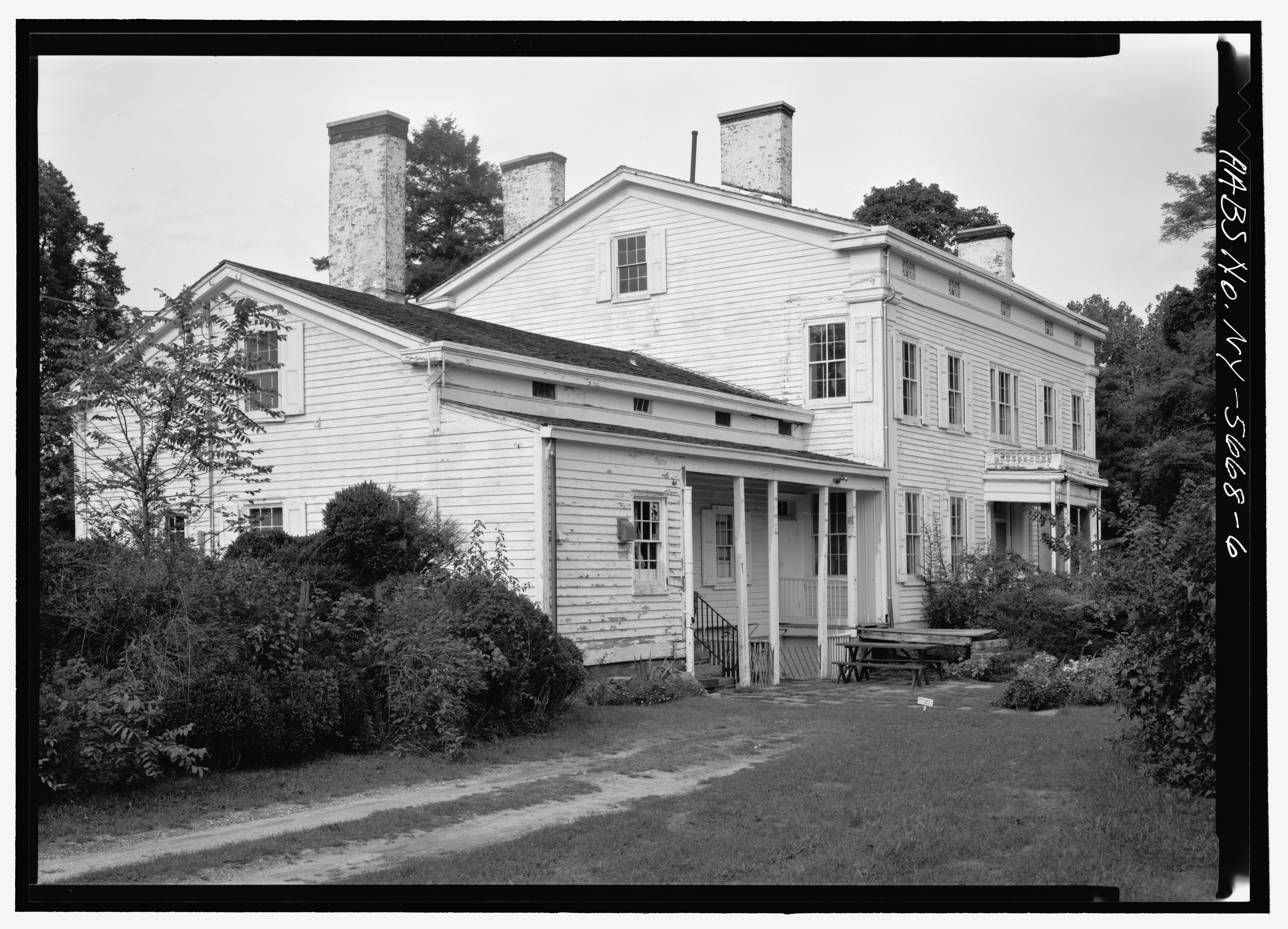
- The Mills Pond House

- Location within New York Location within the United States
- Nearest city: St. James, New York
- Coordinates: 40°54′2″N 73°8′58″W
- Area: 200 acres (81 ha)
- Built: 1730
- Architect: Pollard, Calvin; Curtis, George
- Architectural style: Greek Revival
- NRHP reference No.: 73001277
- Added to NRHP: August 01, 1973

Mills Pond District is a national historic district located at St. James in Suffolk County, New York. The district includes nine contributing buildings. Prominent buildings within the district are the Mills Homestead (1837), Wegrzyn Barn, ice house, Wegrzyn House (c. 1730), Dougherty House (c. 1730), Papadakos House (c. 1820), Gyrodene Gambrel Roofed House (c. 1800), and Perry House (c. 1880).

It was added to the National Register of Historic Places in 1973.
