= By-the-Harbor =

Historic house in New York, United States

- U.S. National Register of Historic Places
- Location within New York Location within the United States
- Location: Moriches Rd., Nissequogue, New York
- Coordinates: 40°53′30″N 73°10′51″W
- Area: 26.9 acres (10.9 ha)
- Architect: McKim, Charles F.; White, Stanford
- Architectural style: Shingle Style
- MPS: Stony Brook Harbor Estates MPS
- NRHP reference No.: 93000699
- Added to NRHP: August 9, 1993

By-the-Harbor, also known as the Prescott Hall Butler and Cornelia Smith Butler Estate, is a historic home located at Nissequogue in Suffolk County, New York. It was built about 1878 as the first of a group of country homes built on Stony Brook Harbor and one of Charles F. McKim's earliest projects. It is a long and narrow, two-story, Shingle Style structure with a low attic level at each end. The south facade features a massive asymmetrical gable that rises from the first floor to the ridge of the roof. Also on the property are the original flanking stone entrance piers and rusted iron gates and casino building. The casino is a sprawling two-story Colonial Revival style building with shingled facades and a hipped roof. The original section, holding a squash court and plunge baths, was designed in the 1890s by McKim, Mead, and White. In 1905, a wing containing a ballroom and designed by Stanford White, was added.

It was added to the National Register of Historic Places in 1993.
