= Harbor House of Central Florida =

Non-profit state-certified domestic violence shelter near Orlando, Florida

- Formation: 1976
- Founder: Barbara Moore
- Type: Domestic violence center
- Legal status: 501 (c)3
- Headquarters: Orlando, FL
- Key people: Michelle Sperzel (CEO)
- Website: www.harborhousefl.com

Harbor House of Central Florida is a non-profit state-certified domestic violence shelter near Orlando, in Orange County, Florida. Harbor House operates a 24-hour crisis hotline, and provides counseling and a 110-bed safe shelter for women, children and men. Its activities include community outreach, legal advocacy services, and community and professional education.

Harbor House receives funding from public and private grants, special events, and individual contributions by supporters. In 2015 the organization includes 45 full-time staff members, 10 part-time staff members, and over a thousand volunteers.

== History ==
Harbor House was founded in 1976 by Barbara Moore. Ms. Moore established Spouse Abuse, Inc., a shelter and hotline, and was its first president. She was the first to record domestic violence incidents in Orlando, and sheltered families in her own home.

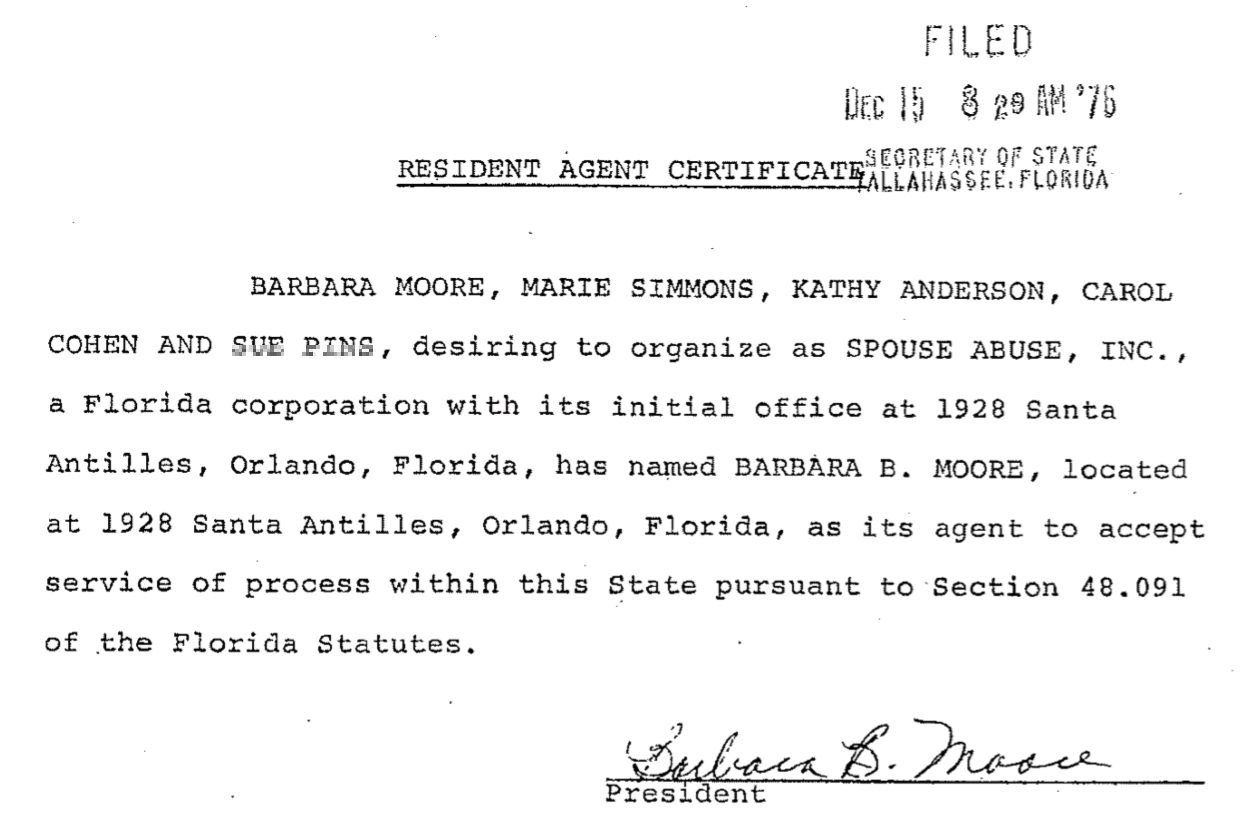

In the mid-1980s, the land for the current Harbor House was donated, and the shelter buildings were constructed. In 1990, Harbor House opened an outreach center and office in the Orange County Courthouse to provide additional support services.

From 1992 to 2004, Harbor House operated a small on-site public school, licensed within the Orange County Public School System. Also in 1992, Harbor House renovated the shelter to add thirty beds to their capacity.

In 2007, the shelter capacity at Harbor House grew from 52 beds to 110 beds. The next year, in 2008, construction began on the Dr. Phillips Children's Center. The center opened in 2011 as a fully licensed day care and after-school care facility.

Harbor House launched Project Courage in 2010, an educational program aimed at first responders and religious leaders. According to a study published in the Journal of Workplace Behavioral Health, the program successfully improved the recognition and responsiveness of trainees to different types of domestic abuse. In December 2012, it opened the Paws for Peace Kennel to house the pets of domestic violence survivors who may postpone leaving out of fear that the animal would be abused. Harbor House has developed the Paws for Peace program into a replicable model, introducing it into other domestic violence shelters in Florida and nationwide.

=== The R3 App ===
In October 2011, Harbor House launched "R3" a mobile app designed to help health care professionals and friends identify victims of domestic abuse, and to refer them for appropriate help. The app was designed by Carol Wick with a tool developed by Dr. Kevin Sherin and created by Echo Interaction Group, based on the HITS screening questionnaire. Based on the user's responses, the app delivers a score that indicates if someone is in an abusive relationship, and then allows the user to enter his or her zip code to find a nearby domestic violence shelter and other resources.

Florida Hospital awarded a $20,000 grant to fund the project, and adopted the technology throughout its network of medical practices. As well as providing a service to community members, the app is also being used by physicians as a tool to classify patients as low, medium, or high-risk for domestic violence. The New England Journal of Medicine highlighted the R3 app in a February 2013 article called "Intimate-Partner Violence – What Physicians Can Do", which recommended that doctors screen women older than 12 for signs of intimate partner violence. One study indicated that the R3 app is 91% effective in identifying abusive relationships.

The app was made available for free to the public through the iTunes and Android app stores in October 2011. A Spanish version of the app was later made available as well.

== Advocacy ==
Pins and Spouse Abuse, Inc. were also founding members of the Refuge Information Network, which later became the Florida Coalition Against Domestic Violence. Harbor House continues to support the advocacy activities of this group. Harbor House also uses traditional and online social media platforms, as well as presentations and several annual events, to raise awareness for the cause of fighting domestic abuse.
