= Halliock Inn =

Historic commercial building in New York, United States

- U.S. National Register of Historic Places
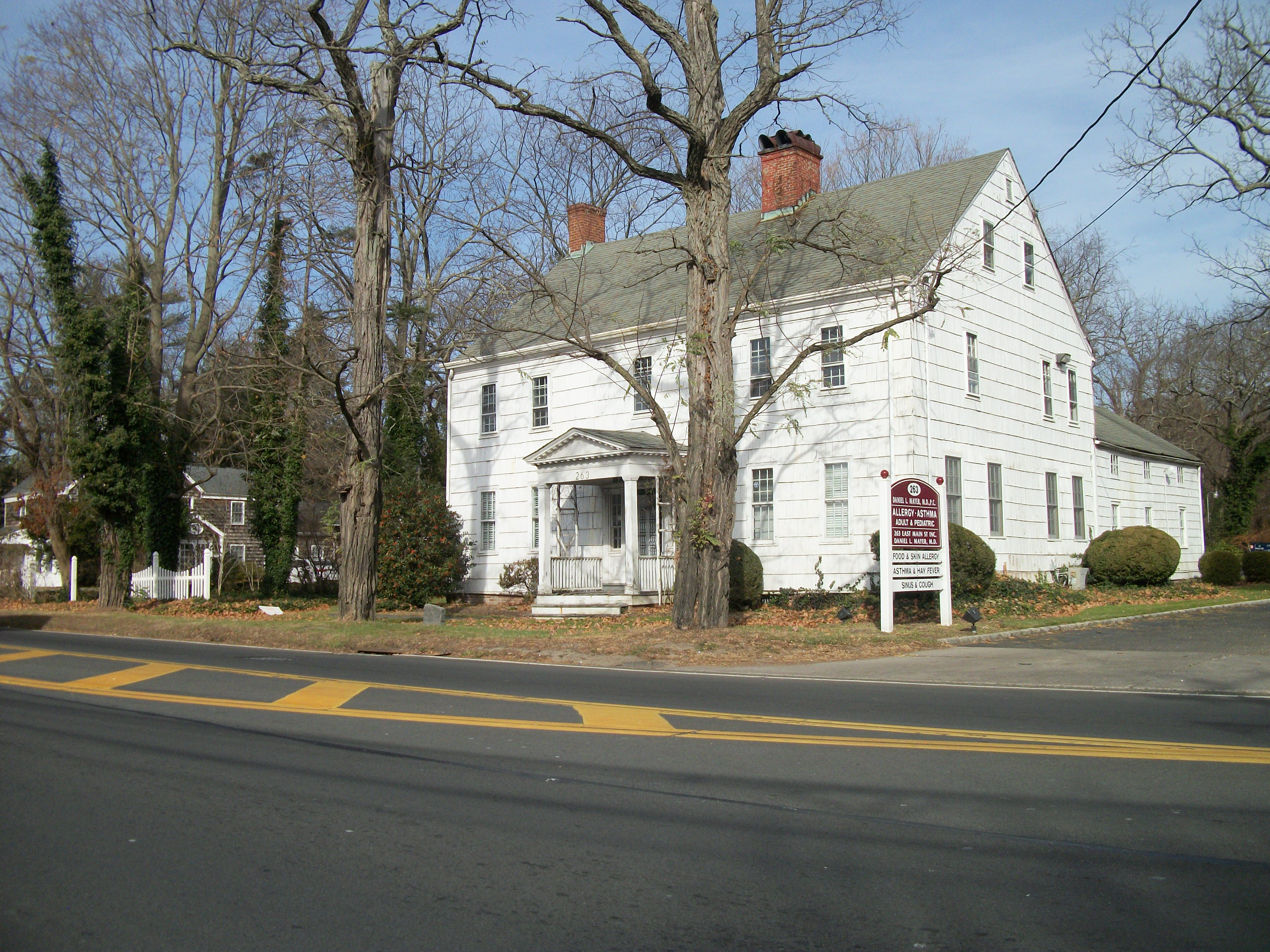
- The former Halliock Inn along NY 25 in the Village of the Branch

- Location within New York Location within the United States
- Location: 263 E. Main St., Village of the Branch, New York
- Coordinates: 40°51′20″N 73°10′50″W
- Area: 4.9 acres (2.0 ha)
- NRHP reference No.: 74001310
- Added to NRHP: August 7, 1974

Halliock Inn is a historic inn and tavern located at Village of the Branch in Suffolk County, New York. It is composed of two main sections: the 2 1/2-story portion and a 1 1/2-story wing to form an L-shaped building. It dates to the 18th century.

It was added to the National Register of Historic Places in 1974. Today, the inn serves as medical offices.
