= Village of the Branch, New York =

- Village
- Incorporated Village of the Branch
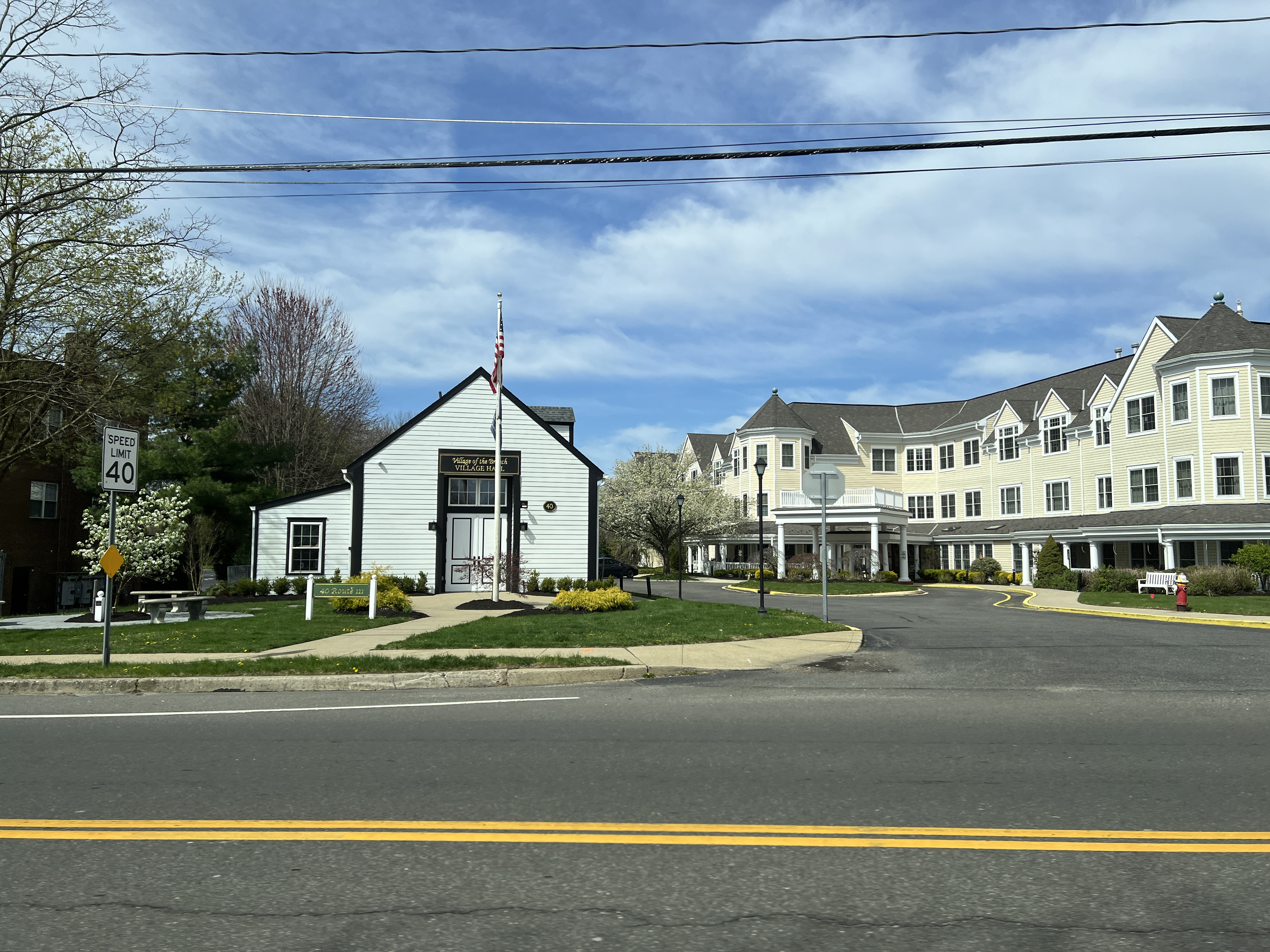
- Branch Village Hall in 2024
- Nicknames: Branch Village; The Branch; Branch
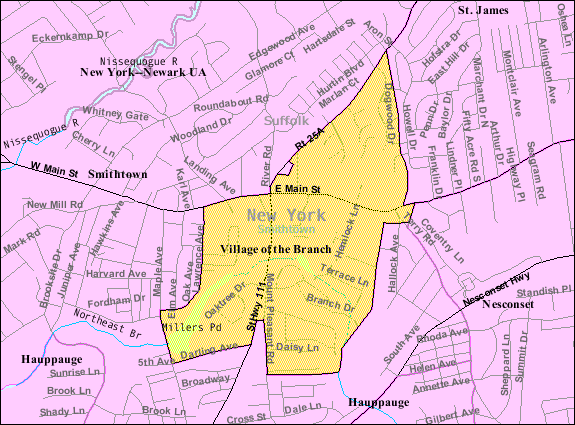

- Location on Long Island Location within the state of New York
- Coordinates: 40°51′15″N 73°11′0″W
- Country: United States
- State: New York
- County: Suffolk
- Town: Smithtown
- Incorporated: 1927

Government
  - Mayor: Mark Delaney

Area
  - Total: 0.98 sq mi (2.54 km^{2})
  - Land: 0.95 sq mi (2.46 km^{2})
  - Water: 0.031 sq mi (0.08 km^{2})
- Elevation: 62 ft (19 m)

Population (2020)
  - Total: 1,735
  - Density: 1,826.3/sq mi (705.13/km^{2})
- Time zone: UTC-5 (Eastern (EST))
  - Summer (DST): UTC-4 (EDT)
- Area codes: 631, 934
- FIPS code: 36-77519
- GNIS feature ID: 0973410
- Website: villageofthebranchny.gov

Village of the Branch (also known as Branch Village, the Branch, or simply Branch) is a village located within the Town of Smithtown in Suffolk County, on Long Island, in New York, United States. It is considered part of the Greater Smithtown area, which is anchored by the hamlet of Smithtown. The population was 1,735 at the time of the 2020 census.

== History ==
The Village of the Branch incorporated itself as a village in 1927.

== Geography ==
According to the United States Census Bureau, the village has a total area of 1.0 square mile (2.6 km^{2}), of which 0.9 square miles (2.3 km^{2}) is land and 0.04 square miles (0.10 km^{2}), or 3.09%, is water.

== Demographics ==
Historical population
Census	Pop.	Note	%±
1930	114		—
1940	185		62.3%
1950	163		−11.9%
1960	886		443.6%
1970	1,675		89.1%
1980	1,707		1.9%
1990	1,669		−2.2%
2000	1,895		13.5%
2010	1,807		−4.6%
2020	1,735		−4.0%
U.S. Decennial Census

As of the census of 2000, there were 1,895 people, 605 households, and 513 families residing in the village. The population density was 2,020.3 inhabitants per square mile (780.0/km^{2}). There were 611 housing units at an average density of 651.4 per square mile (251.5/km^{2}). The racial makeup of the village was 95.83% White, 0.16% African American, 0.05% Native American, 2.59% Asian, 0.84% from other races, and 0.53% from two or more races. Hispanic or Latino of any race were 3.01% of the population.

There were 605 households, out of which 37.5% had children under the age of 18 living with them, 76.4% were married couples living together, 6.4% had a female householder with no husband present, and 15.2% were non-families. 13.1% of all households were made up of individuals, and 5.5% had someone living alone who was 65 years of age or older. The average household size was 2.92 and the average family size was 3.19.

In the village, the population was spread out, with 23.7% under the age of 18, 5.6% from 18 to 24, 26.9% from 25 to 44, 27.1% from 45 to 64, and 16.7% who were 65 years of age or older. The median age was 41 years. For every 100 females, there were 90.1 males. For every 100 females age 18 and over, there were 84.9 males.

The median income for a household in the village was $83,036, and the median income for a family was $90,622. Males had a median income of $68,125 versus $38,125 for females. The per capita income for the village was $32,416. About 1.7% of families and 4.7% of the population were below the poverty line, including 3.1% of those under age 18 and 10.5% of those age 65 or over.

== Education ==
The Village of the Branch is located within the boundaries of – and is thus served by – the Smithtown Central School District. Two of the district's elementary schools – Dogwood Elementary School and Smithtown Elementary School – are located within the village.

Additionally, one private school, the Saint Patrick's School, is located within the village.

== Landmarks ==
The village includes a 20-acre (8.1 ha) national historic district consisting of 15 houses, a church, and a library built between about 1700 and 1965. Located within the district are the Halliock Inn and First Presbyterian Church.

== See also ==
- List of municipalities in New York
- Village of the Landing, New York
