= First Presbyterian Church (Smithtown, New York) =

Historic church in New York, United States

- U.S. National Register of Historic Places
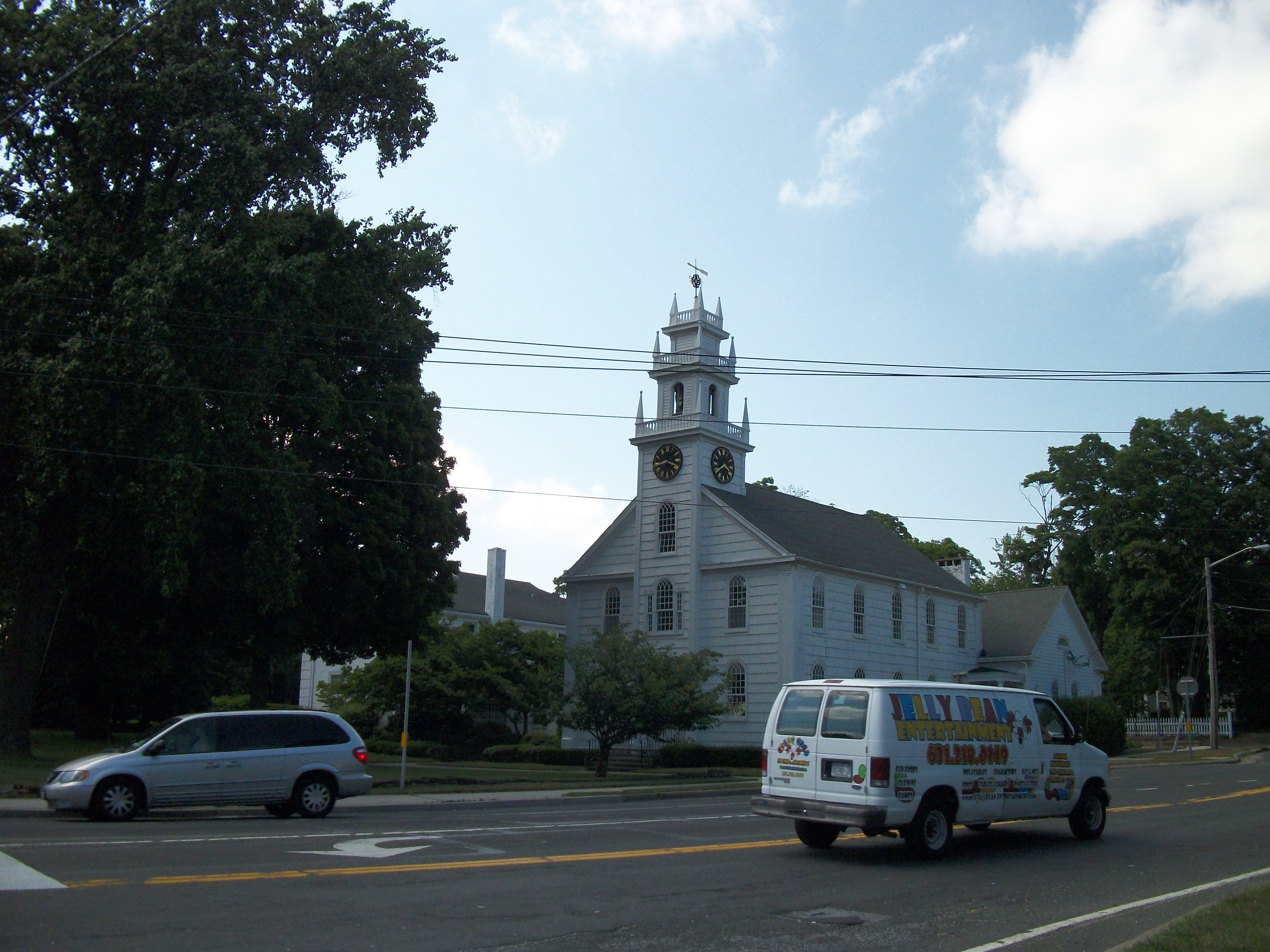
- The church as seen from across NY 25A at the Smithtown Main Library

- Location within New York Location within the United States
- Location: 175 E. Main St., Smithtown, New York
- Coordinates: 40°51′24″N 73°11′18″W
- Area: 2 acres (0.81 ha)
- Built: 1825
- Architect: Curtiss, George
- NRHP reference No.: 77000983
- Added to NRHP: December 23, 1977

First Presbyterian Church is a historic Presbyterian church at 175 East Main Street in Smithtown, Suffolk County, New York. It was built in 1825 and the sanctuary is a rectangular, two story frame structure measuring 56 feet (17 m) by 34 feet (10 m). It is sheathed in wood shingles and covered by a gable roof. It features an engaged, square tower surmounted by a tiered, balustraded belfry. The tower has a Palladian window at its second level.

The church was added to the National Register of Historic Places in 1977.
