= Head of the Harbor, New York =

- Village
- Incorporated Village of Head of the Harbor
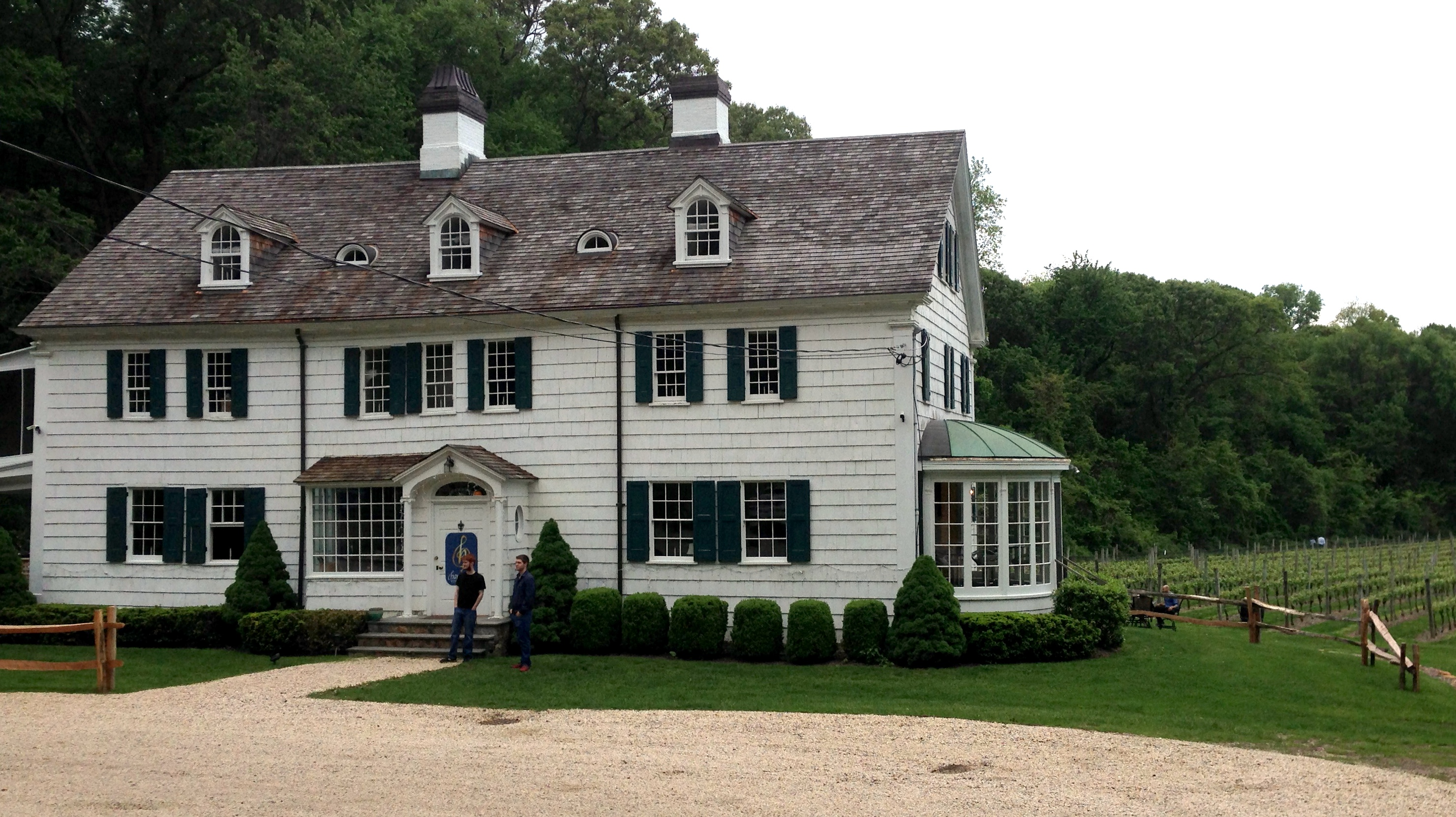
- c. 1690 farmhouse on the East Farm Estate, currently used as a winery tasting room

- Seal

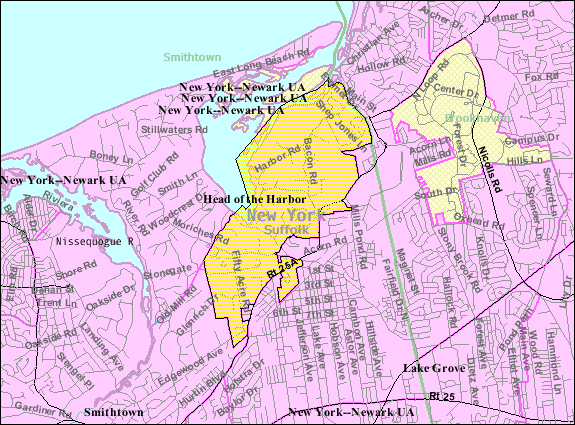
- U.S. Census map of Head of the Harbor

- Location within the state of New York Head of the Harbor, New York (New York)
- Coordinates: 40°53′54″N 73°9′44″W
- Country: United States
- State: New York
- County: Suffolk
- Town: Smithtown
- Incorporated: 1928

Government
  - Mayor: Michael Utevsky

Area
  - Total: 3.03 sq mi (7.86 km^{2})
  - Land: 2.81 sq mi (7.27 km^{2})
  - Water: 0.23 sq mi (0.59 km^{2})
- Elevation: 121 ft (37 m)

Population (2020)
  - Total: 1,520
  - Density: 541.8/sq mi (209.19/km^{2})
- Time zone: UTC-5 (Eastern (EST))
  - Summer (DST): UTC-4 (EDT)
- ZIP codes: 11780, 11790
- Area code(s): 631 and 934
- FIPS code: 36-32963
- GNIS feature ID: 0952475
- Website: www.headoftheharborny.gov

Head of the Harbor is a village in Suffolk County, in Town of Smithtown. on the North Shore of Long Island, New York, United States. As of the 2020 census, Head of the Harbor had a population of 1,520.

== History ==
Head of the Harbor incorporated as a village in 1928.

== Geography ==
According to the United States Census Bureau, the village has a total area of 3.0 square miles (7.8 km^{2}), of which 2.8 square miles (7.3 km^{2}) is land and 0.2 square miles (0.52 km^{2}), or 7.52%, is water.Harbor. The St. James post office (11780) covers the majority of the village, which the St James CDP is located South of the village. While, the most northern part of the village is covered by the Stony Brook post office (11790), which the CDP is located north of the village.

== Education ==
The majority of the village is served by the Smithtown Central School District, located in the Town of Smithtown. However, despite being the village entirely located in the Town of Smithtown the Northern part of the village is part of the Three Village Central School District in the Town of Brookhaven. It roughly corresponds to the Zip Code boundaries as all the residents of Head of the Harbor with Stony Brook zip codes are part of the Three Village Central School District, however some residents with St. James Zip Codes also attend Three Village Central School District as well.

== Demographics ==
Historical population
| Census | Pop. | Note | %± |
|---|---|---|---|
| 1930 | 244 | | — |
| 1940 | 255 | | 4.5% |
| 1950 | 334 | | 31.0% |
| 1960 | 524 | | 56.9% |
| 1970 | 943 | | 80.0% |
| 1980 | 1,023 | | 8.5% |
| 1990 | 1,354 | | 32.4% |
| 2000 | 1,447 | | 6.9% |
| 2010 | 1,472 | | 1.7% |
| 2020 | 1,520 | | 3.3% |
U.S. Decennial Census

At the 2000 census, there were 1,447 people, 484 households, and 413 families in the village. The population density was 513.6 inhabitants per square mile (198.3/km^{2}). There were 501 housing units at an average density of 177.8 per square mile (68.6/km^{2}). The racial makup of the village was 95.02% White, 1.24% African American, 3.25% Asian, and 0.48% from two or more races. Hispanic or Latino of any race were 1.38% of the population.

Of the 484 households 38.4% had children under the age of 18 living with them, 77.9% were married couples living together, 4.3% had a female householder with no spouse present, and 14.5% were non-families. 11.4% of households were one person and 3.5% were one person aged 65 or older. The average household size was 2.99 and the average family size was 3.23.

The age distribution was 27.0% under the age of 18, 5.2% from 18 to 24, 25.0% from 25 to 44, 31.2% from 45 to 64, and 11.6% 65 or older. The median age was 41 years. For every 100 females, there were 102.4 males. For every 100 women age 18 and over, there were 101.9 men.

The median household income was $117,450 and the median family income was $129,157. Males had a median income of $97,095 versus $50,481 for females. The per capita income for the village was $52,999. About 1.2% of families and 1.5% of the population were below the poverty line, including none of those under age 18 and 2.9% of those age 65 or over.

== Government ==
As of April 2024, the Mayor of Head of the Harbor is Michael Utevsky, the Deputy Mayor is Lisa Davidson, and the Village Trustees are Jeffrey D. Fischer, Judith C. Ogden, and Daniel White.

The local Head of the Harbor Police Department covers the village.

The vast majority of the village is served by the St. James fire department, however the northern part is covered by Stony Brook Fire Department.

== Notable person ==
- Robert Mercer, billionaire hedge fund manager. Owns the Renaissance Technologies' headquarters in Three Village.
