= Nissequogue, New York =

- Village
- Incorporated Village of Nissequogue
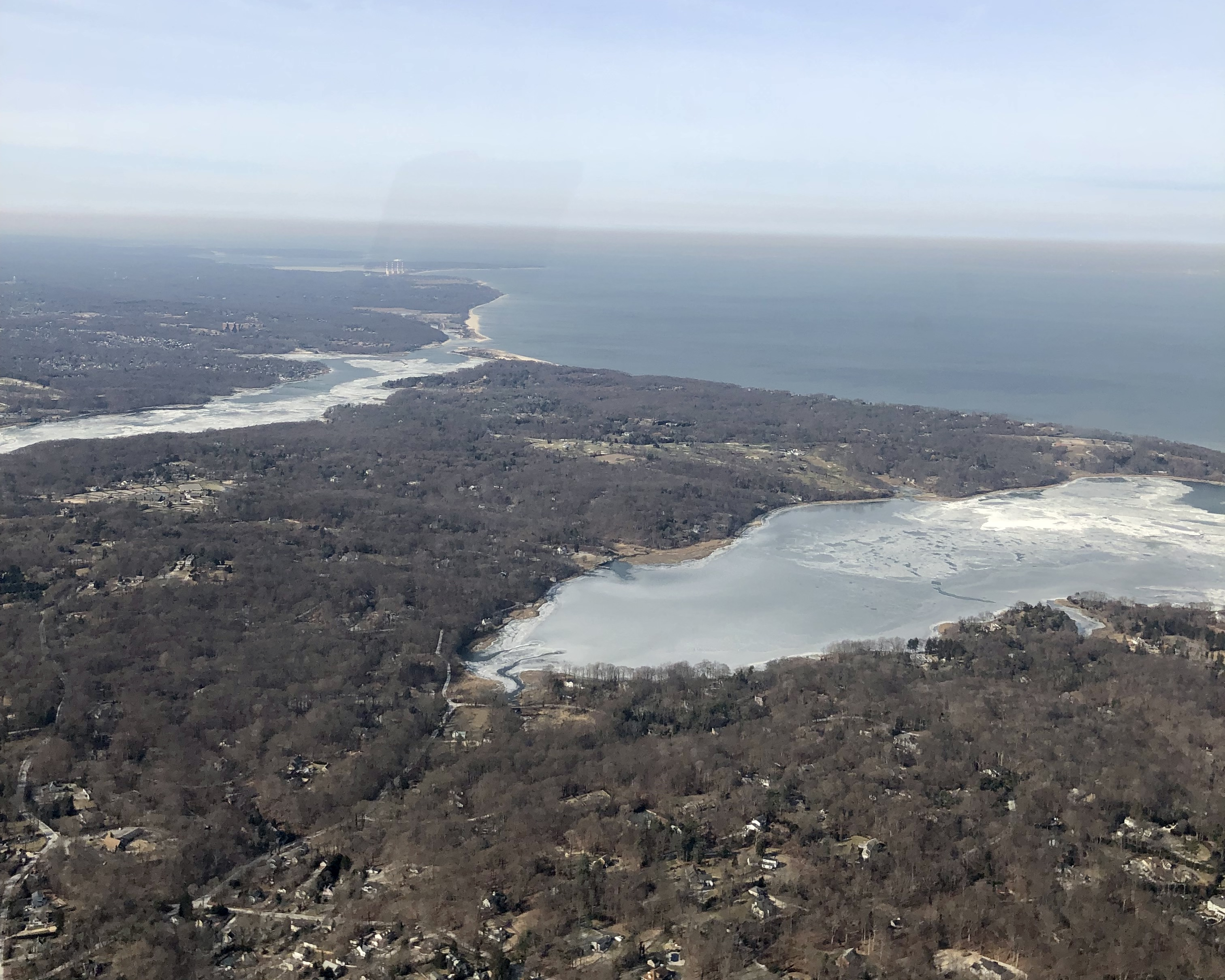
- Nissequogue and its surroundings, as seen from the air in 2019, looking northwest.

- Flag Seal

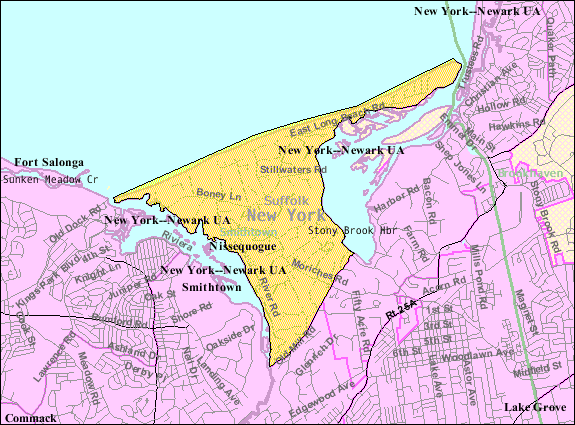
- U.S. Census map of Nissequogue

- Location on Long Island Location within the state of New York
- Coordinates: 40°53′55″N 73°11′41″W
- Country: United States
- State: New York
- County: Suffolk
- Town: Smithtown
- Incorporated: 1925

Government
  - Mayor: Richard B. Smith

Area
  - Total: 4.03 sq mi (10.44 km^{2})
  - Land: 3.81 sq mi (9.86 km^{2})
  - Water: 0.22 sq mi (0.57 km^{2})
- Elevation: 85 ft (26 m)

Population (2020)
  - Total: 1,564
  - Density: 410.7/sq mi (158.58/km^{2})
- Time zone: UTC-5 (Eastern (EST))
  - Summer (DST): UTC-4 (EDT)
- ZIP code: 11780
- Area codes: 631, 934
- FIPS code: 36-51286
- GNIS feature ID: 0958622
- Website: nissequogueny.gov

Nissequogue (/ˈnɪsəkwɒɡ/) is a village in Suffolk County, on the North Shore of Long Island, in New York, United States. The village population was 1,564 at the 2020 census.

The Incorporated Village of Nissequogue is located entirely within the Town of Smithtown.

== History ==
Nissequogue incorporated as a village in 1925.

In the early 1970s, during the administration of Mayor James Donahue, Nissequogue Village Hall opened inside the former Moriches Road Schoolhouse. Nissequogue Village Hall was dedicated to Donahue in 2017.

In 1973, Donahue and his administration established the Village of Nissequogue Fire Department and purchased the land for the village's firehouse. The village created the fire department after the Saint James Fire Department, which had served the village for decades, proposed increasing their rates for fire protection services in Nissequogue.

The Mayor of Nissequogue (as of July 2022), Richard B. Smith, is a descendant and a namesake of the first English settler of the village, Richard Smith (Smythe).

== Geography ==
According to the United States Census Bureau, the village has a total area of 4.0 square miles (10 km^{2}), of which 3.8 square miles (9.8 km^{2}) is land and 0.2 square miles (0.52 km^{2}), or 5.04%, is water.

To the west of the village is its namesake, the Nissequogue River. To the north is Long Island Sound, while to the east is Stony Brook Harbor. Moriches Road runs through the center of the village.

Nissequogue, in its entirety, is served by the St. James Post Office (located in the adjacent hamlet and CDP of St. James) and uses the St. James, New York 11780 ZIP code.

Nissequogue is known for its preservation of the natural Long Island landscape. Its unique scenery is facilitated by a two-acre minimum on property subdivisions and a ban on industry real estate within the village's boundaries.

== Demographics ==
Historical population
Census	Pop.	Note	%±
1930	174		—
1940	188		8.0%
1950	219		16.5%
1960	332		51.6%
1970	1,120		237.3%
1980	1,462		30.5%
1990	1,620		10.8%
2000	1,543		−4.8%
2010	1,749		13.4%
2020	1,564		−10.6%
U.S. Decennial Census

As of the census of 2000, there were 1,543 people, 533 households, and 455 families residing in the village. The population density was 408.9 inhabitants per square mile (157.9/km^{2}). There were 570 housing units at an average density of 151.1 per square mile (58.3/km^{2}). The racial makeup of the village was 97.34% White, 0.13% African American, 0.97% Asian, and 1.56% from two or more races. Hispanic or Latino of any race were 2.92% of the population.

There were 533 households, out of which 36.0% had children under the age of 18 living with them, 79.2% were married couples living together, 4.5% had a female householder with no husband present, and 14.6% were non-families. 12.2% of all households were made up of individuals, and 4.3% had someone living alone who was 65 years of age or older. The average household size was 2.89 and the average family size was 3.15.

In the village, the population was spread out, with 25.6% under the age of 18, 4.4% from 18 to 24, 25.3% from 25 to 44, 32.9% from 45 to 64, and 11.9% who were 65 years of age or older. The median age was 42 years. For every 100 females, there were 106.0 males. For every 100 females age 18 and over, there were 100.7 males.

The median income for a household in the village was $140,786, and the median income for a family was $157,973. Males had a median income of $100,000 versus $69,167 for females. The per capita income for the village was $63,148. About 1.1% of families and 2.4% of the population were below the poverty line, including none of those under age 18 and 2.7% of those age 65 or over.

== Education ==
The entire village is served by the Smithtown Central School District.

== Government ==
As of January 2026, the Mayor of Nissequogue is Richard B. Smith, the Deputy Mayor is Kurt J. Meyer, and the Village Trustees are Russell J. von Frank II, Cynthia S. Marsh, and George Gavaris.

The Nissequogue Police Department covers the entire village. It is still covered by the Nissequogue Fire Department to this day.

== Parks and recreation ==
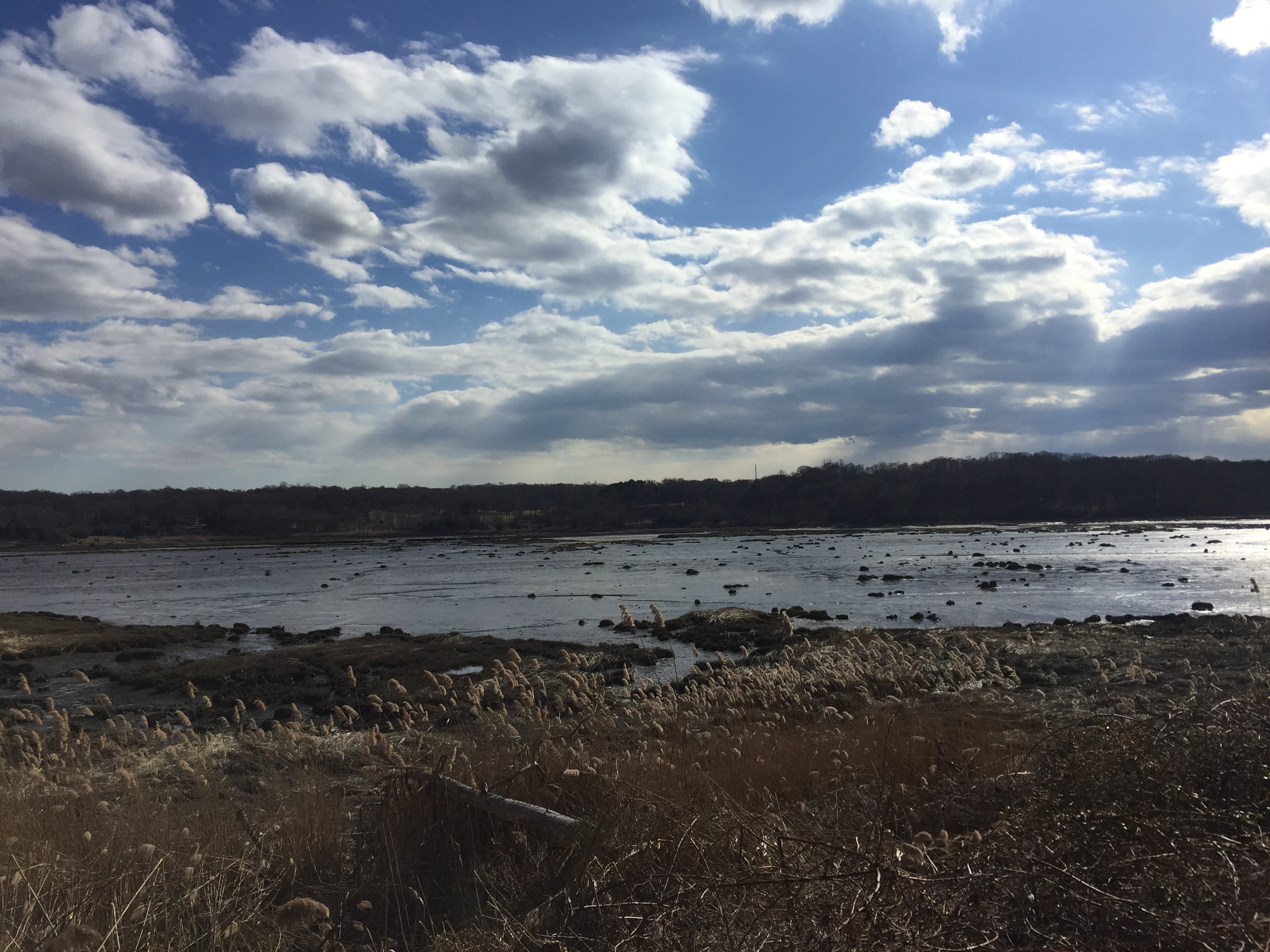
The Nissequogue River, one of the major landmarks in the village.

Nissequogue's most popular parks are Long Beach Town Park, Short Beach, The David Weld Sanctuary, and The Boney Lane Farm located on the old Boney Lane now known as Short Beach Road.
