= Lawrence Grant White =

American architect (1887–1956)

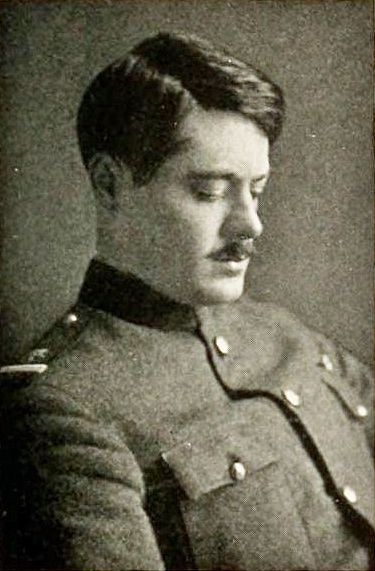
- White photographed by Francis R. Appleton during World War I
- Born: September 26, 1887; New York City
- Died: September 8, 1956 (aged 68); St. James, New York
- Education: Harvard University; École des Beaux-Arts
- Spouse: Laura Astor Chanler (m. 1916)
- Children: Eight, including: Robert Winthrop White
- Parent(s): Stanford White; Bessie Springs Smith
- Relatives: Richard Grant White (grandfather) J. Lawrence Smith (grandfather)
- Awards: Legion of Honour

Lawrence Grant White (September 26, 1887 – September 8, 1956) was an American architect, a partner in the architectural firm of McKim, Mead & White, co-founded by his father Stanford White, and for five years the president of the National Academy of Design.

== Early life ==
Lawrence White, who was known as Larry, was born in New York City in 1887, the only surviving child of renowned architect Stanford White (1853–1906) and Elizabeth "Bessie" Springs (née Smith) White (1862–1950). His only sibling, an elder brother who died in infancy in 1885, was named after his paternal grandfather Richard Grant White, a Shakespearean scholar, husband of Alexina Black (née Mease) White. Larry White's maternal grandparents were John Lawrence Smith (1816–1889) and Sarah Nicoll (née Clinch) Smith (1823–1890), members of the family after which Smithtown is named. An uncle, James Clinch Smith, died aboard the RMS Titanic in 1912.

White grew up at Box Hill, a farmhouse converted to an Italianate mansion by his architect father, situated on his parents' 60-acre Long Island estate. In 1906, when he was almost 20 years old, his father was shot and killed by Harry K. Thaw over the father's affair with Thaw's wife, Evelyn Nesbit.

== Career ==
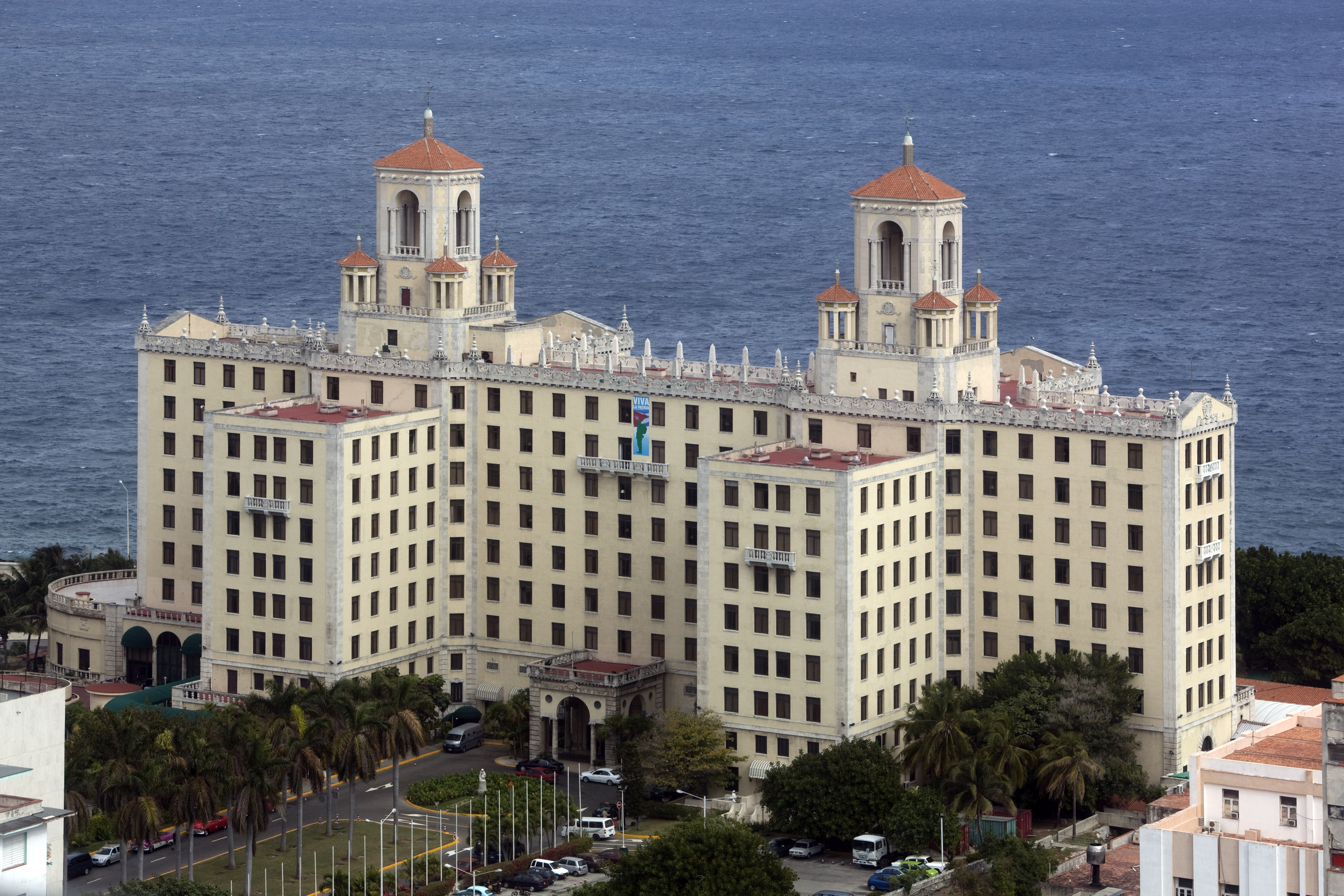
Hotel Nacional in Havana, Cuba

In 1908, White earned an A.B. degree cum laude from Harvard University, and in 1913, he received a diploma from the École des Beaux-Arts in Paris. From 1915 until 1917, he worked at McKim, Mead & White (as did his Harvard classmate and fellow architect Frederic Rhinelander King).

=== McKim, Mead & White ===
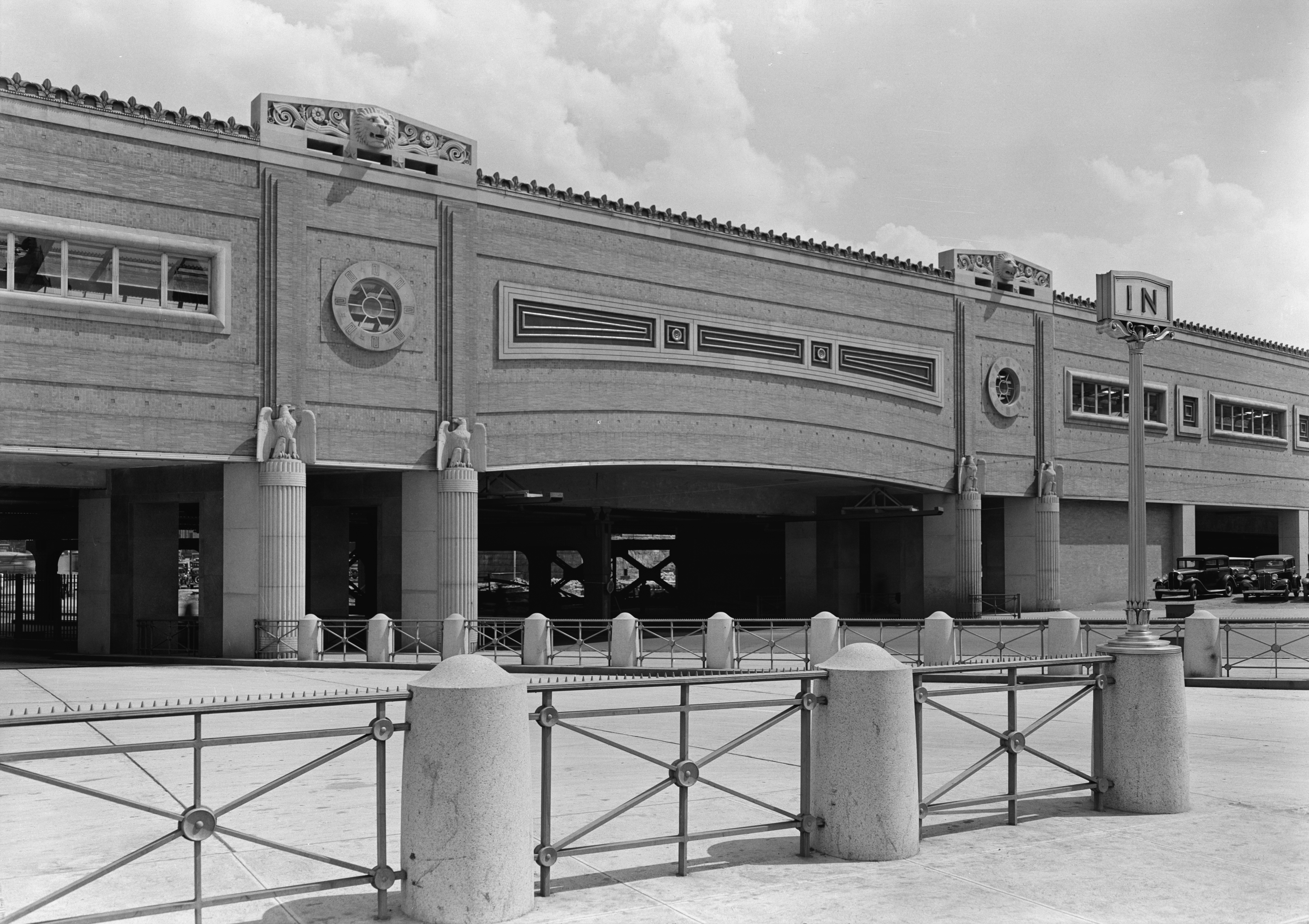
Pennsylvania Railroad Station in Newark, New Jersey

In 1919, after serving in the navy during World War I, he re-joined the architectural firm of McKim, Mead & White, co-founded in 1879 by his late father with William Rutherford Mead and Charles Follen McKim.

At McKim, Mead & White, he worked closely with William Mitchell Kendall. He designed the Hotel Nacional in Havana, Cuba, and the (since destroyed) Savoy-Plaza Hotel on Fifth Avenue in New York. He also designed the Pennsylvania Railroad Station in Newark, 52 Wall Street, the Regimental Barracks on Governors Island, and the Girard Trust Company offices in Philadelphia.

Chanler was a social acquaintance of Mildred Barnes Bliss and Robert Woods Bliss who were friends with Edith Wharton and Margaret Chanler, his wife's mother. The Bliss' engaged White and the firm to design the buildings of the Service Group at Dumbarton Oaks as well as the Music Room and the East Bay of the living room.

White served as the president of the National Academy of Design for five years and a trustee of the Metropolitan Museum of Art shortly before his death. According to The New York Times, White was "a renaissance man" who "wrote light verse, painted, played the piano and published a translation of Dante's Inferno." In fact in 1948 he published a translation of Dante's entire Divine Comedy.

== Personal life ==
On June 19, 1916, Larry White married Laura Astor Chanler (1887–1984), the eldest child of Winthrop Astor Chanler and Margaret Louisa (née Terry) Chanler; a descendant of the Ward, Astor, Dudley–Winthrop, Livingston and Stuyvesant families; and a painter and sculptor who trained at the Académie Julian in Paris. Together, they raised eight children at Box Hill:

- F. L. Peter White (1917–2009), who married Jehanne Price in 1943.
- Elizabeth Stuyvesant White (1920–2011), a Roman Catholic nun.
- Robert Winthrop White (1921–2002), a sculptor who married Claire Nicolas (1925–2020), a poet and niece of Aldous Huxley.
- Alida Mary White (ca. 1922–2020), who married (1st) in 1943 the composer John Lessard (1920–2003), and after their divorce, married (2nd) in 1996 Montgomery Hare (1911–1998).
- John Chanler White (1924–1989), who married in 1968 Claire Raiguel McAllister, the daughter of Judge Thomas Francis McAllister.
- Cynthia Margaret White (b. ca. 1927), who married Robert Dean Jay (1921–1998).
- Sarah M. White (b. ca. 1929), a Roman Catholic nun.
- Ann Octavia White (ca. 1932–2021), an architect who married in 1955 Harold Buttrick (1931–2015), co-founder of the architecture firm Buttrick White & Burtis.

Larry White died on September 8, 1956, at his home in St. James, New York. He was buried at Saint James Episcopal Church graveyard in St. James.

=== Descendants ===
Lawrence Grant White has many descendants, including Genevieve White Carter, an interior designer.
