= John Lessard =

American classical composer

John Ayres Lessard
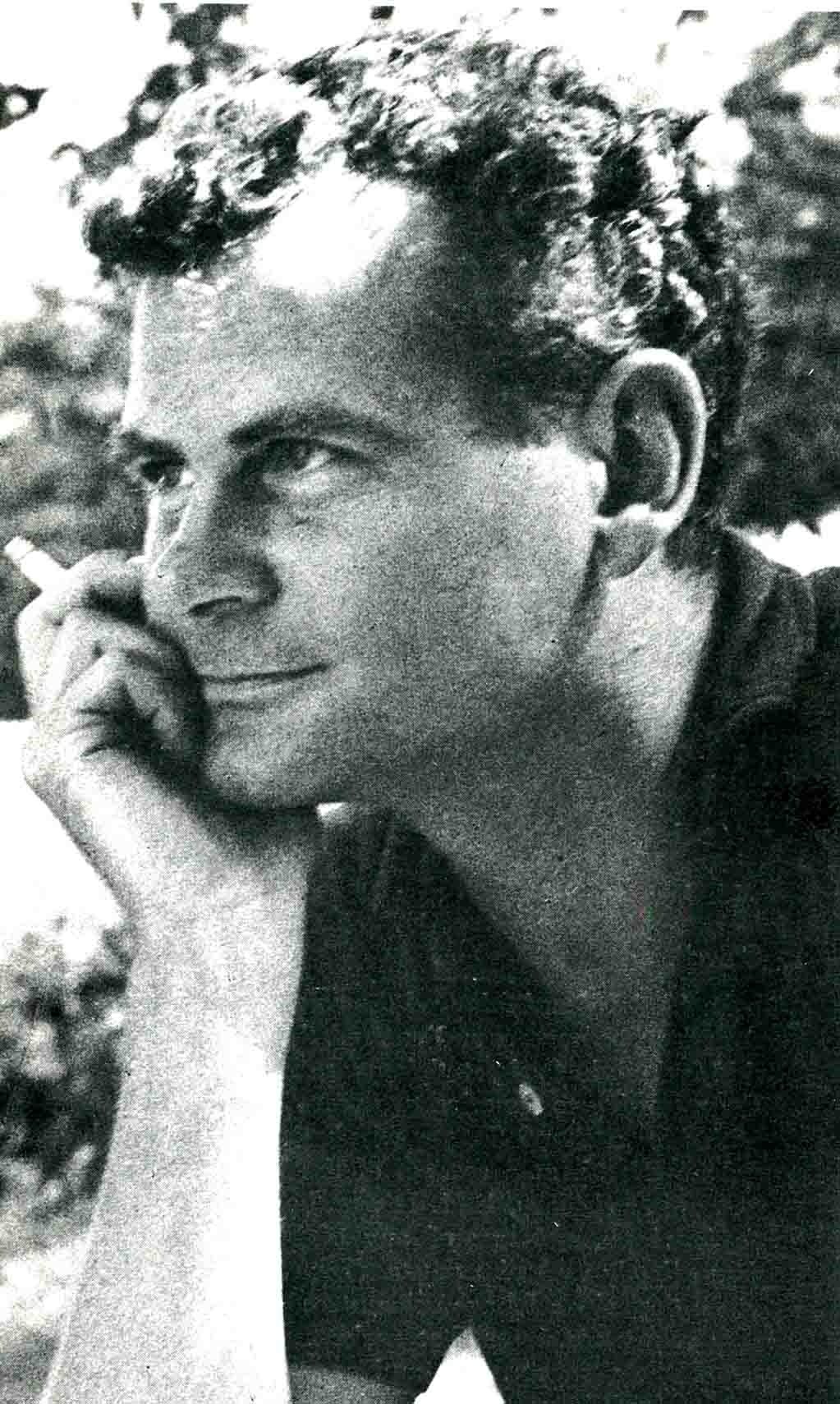
- John Lessard, circa 1960 (Courtesy of American Composers Alliance)
- Born: July 3, 1920; San Francisco, California
- Died: January 11, 2003 (aged 82); East Setauket, New York
- Other names: Jack
- Occupations: Composer and educator
- Known for: Neo-classical works for piano, voice, ensembles and orchestra

John Lessard (July 3, 1920 – January 11, 2003) was an American composer and music educator noted among peers for his eloquent and dramatic neo-classical works for piano and voice, chamber ensembles, and orchestra, as well as for his playful pieces for mixed percussion ensembles. He was also an accomplished pianist and conductor.

== Early life ==
Born John Ayres Lessard in San Francisco on July 3, 1920, he was raised in Palo Alto by parents with Quebec roots, quickly becoming fluent in both French and English. He began piano lessons at the age of five, then trumpet lessons at nine, and two years later joined the San Francisco Civic Symphony Orchestra. He studied piano and theory with Elise Belenky and also worked briefly with the composer Henry Cowell. At sixteen, he was offered a scholarship to study with Arnold Schoenberg, but felt so repelled by his music and the Vienna School outlook that he refused the scholarship and went to study in France. From 1937 to 1940 he was a pupil of Nadia Boulanger, Georges Dandelot, Alfred Cortot and Ernst Levy at the École Normale de Musique in Paris, earning a diploma in “Harmonie, Contrepointe et Fugue.” When Paris fell to the Germans in June 1940, he fled to the U.S. along with Boulanger, where he continued his studies with her at the Longy School of Music in Cambridge, Massachusetts, gaining another diploma. However, he was soon drafted into the U.S. Army Signal Corps. In May 1943, he was engaged to Alida White, a voice student and granddaughter of the legendary Beaux-Arts architect Stanford White. He then spent the duration of the war back in Europe with a unit assigned to liaison between American troops and allied French fighters and personnel.

== Stylistic influences ==
Influenced early on by Igor Stravinsky and the Neo-classic School, Lessard's compositions were primarily neo-classical in style, and typically short in length; he also employed serial techniques, though not dependent on any rigid system. He was also influenced by the work of Debussy and later Webern. With a leg-up from fellow Boulanger student Aaron Copland, he was able to have his first Piano Sonata presented in 1941, winning high praise from composer and music critic Virgil Thomson along with wide public recognition. In the early post-war years he was fortunate to have performances of several of his orchestral works led by Léon Barzin, Leonard Bernstein and Thor Johnson, in New York and elsewhere.

== Teaching career and later work ==
In 1962, he began teaching theory and composition at the newly founded State University of New York at Stony Brook, where he remained until retiring in 1990, all the while continuing to compose on his own. During the period 1964-74 Professor Lessard focused on songs for voice and piano, composing over 35 settings.

== Recordings ==
Performances of his work were recorded on the CRI, Serenus Records, and Opus One labels, with a long gap of few recordings in the 1970s and 80s. Performers included another friend and Boulanger protégé, the harpsichordist Sylvia Marlowe.

== Personal life ==
Lessard and his wife Alida occupied The Red Cottage on the extensive Box Hill property overlooking Nissequogue Harbor in St. James, Long Island, NY, where they raised six daughters.

In addition to working with Alida in her capacity as an accomplished performer of lieder, Lessard also enjoyed close relations with others in the White family living nearby, often collaborating with the poet Claire Nicolas White, wife of Alida’s brother Robert White, who was a sculptor and educator. The Whites were a Social Register family related to the Wards, Astors, Winthrops, Chanlers, Roosevelts, Rockefellers, and others.

In the early 1970s, Jack and Alida were divorced. On June 12, 1973, he married Stony Brook professor and colleague Sarah Fuller, Ph.D, and resided with her at 15 Scott’s Cove Lane in nearby East Setauket. In 1996, a book written by Lessard’s eldest daughter, Suzannah Lessard, was published, which, while using pseudonyms, contained devastating implied allegations of past improprieties with his children while intoxicated.

== Death ==
John Lessard died in East Setauket on January 11, 2003, aged 82.

== Awards and grants ==
Lessard received two Guggenheim fellowships (1946, 1953) as well as awards from the Alice M. Ditson Fund (1946) and the American Academy of Arts and Letters (1952). He was also given the title of Professor Emeritus of Music at SUNY Stony Brook.

== Compositions ==
John Lessard longer works by date of composition
Year	Title	Description	Time (min.)
1940	Piano Sonata No.1	Piano solo	17
1941	Concerto for Violin & Orchestra	Chamber orchestra with flute, clarinet and violin	20
1946	Box Hill Overture	Orchestra	
1946	Cantilena for Oboe & String Orchestra	Mixed instrumental ensemble	6
1946	Little Concert: Suite for Piano	Piano solo	7
1947	Little Concert for Orchestra	Orchestra	12
1948	Three Movements for Violin and Piano	Piano and violin	17
1951	Toccata in Four Movements for Harpsichord	Large harpsichord – dedicated to Sylvia Marlowe	
1952	Concerto for Winds & Strings	Chamber orchestra with flute, clarinet, violin, viola, cello and bassoon	15
1956	Sonata for Violoncello and Piano	Piano and cello	
1956	Three Songs for St. Cecelia's Day	Piano and voice – lyric after W.H. Auden	8
1957	Serenade For Symphony Orchestra	Orchestra	11
1959	Suite for Orchestra	Orchestra	12
1961	Sinfonietta Concertante	Chamber orchestra	15
1963	String Trio	Violin, viola and cello	17
1964	12 Mother Goose Songs	Piano, voice, violin, viola and cello	18
1966	New Worlds for the Young Pianist I	24 pieces for young pianists	
1966	New Worlds for the Young Pianist II	16 pieces for intermediate piano students	
1966	Trio in Sei Parti	Piano, violin and cello	18
1967	Quodlibets for Brass Trio	Trumpets and trombone	8
1969	Fragments from the Cantos of Ezra Pound for Baritone And 9 Instruments		
1971	Brass Quintet		
1973	Trios of Consanguinity	In various combinations: violin or flute, viola or clarinet, cello or bassoon	12
1974	Pastimes and an Alleluia	Orchestra	
1974	Fantasy for Trumpet and Piano	Trumpet and piano	11
1978	Movements for Trumpet & Various Instruments VI	Trumpet solo, tom-toms, temple blocks, xylophone and crotales	15
1980	Threads of Sound Recalled	Piano solo	20
1982	Concerto for Harp & Orchestra	Chamber orchestra with trumpet and harp	22
1984	Movements for Trumpet & Various Instruments VIII	Trumpet, vibraphone and marimba	9
1984	Pond in a Bowl	Piano, vibraphone, marimba, bongos and voice – lyric after Han Yu	17
1985	Four Pieces for Violin and Percussion	Violin, xylophone, marimba, temple blocks and bongos	19
1988	Bagatelle for Piano II	Piano solo	7
1989	An Assembled Sequence for a Solo Percussionist	Glockenspiel, vibraphone, gongs, tam-tams, castanets, claves and guiro	30
1989	An Assembled Sequence VIII: Making A Collection	Vibraphone and marimba	10
1989	Bagatelle for Piano III	Piano solo	7
1989	Ten Pieces for Piano Four Hands (Games and Pastimes)	Piano four-hands	16
1991	Bagatelle for Piano IV	Piano solo	10
1992	The Seasons	Piano, percussion and voice – lyric after T’ang Dynasty poems	25
1993	Quintet	Piano, flute, clarinet, violin, and cello	19
1994	Gather and Disperse	Chamber orchestra with piano, flute, trumpet, trombone, clarinet, violin and percussion	19
1995	Four Songs, on Poems by Claire Nicolas White	Piano and voice	19
1996	Three Indian Tales	Percussion and voice – lyric by Claire Nicolas White, adapted from American Indian Tales	18
1998	Bagatelle for Piano V	Piano solo	7
2000	Music for Solo Harp and Chamber Ensemble	Chamber ensemble with piano, flute, clarinet, violin, cello, harp and percussion	20
