= Lessard =

Lessard may refer to:

== People ==
- Alton A. Lessard (1909–1976), American politician
- Bob Lessard (born 1931), American politician
- Evelyn Lessard, American biological oceanographer
- Francis Lessard (born 1979), Canadian ice hockey player
- François-Louis Lessard (1860–1927), Canadian general
- Laurent Lessard (born 1962), Canadian politician
- Lucien Lessard (1938–2024), Canadian politician
- Lucille Lessard (born 1957), Canadian archer
- Jean Lessard (1932–2013), Canadian alpine skier
- John Lessard (1920–2003), American composer
- Joseph Lessard (1847–1914), Canadian politician
- Junior Lessard (born 1980), Canadian ice hockey player
- Marcel Lessard (1926–2023), Canadian politician
- Marie-Andrée Lessard (born 1977), Canadian beach volleyball player
- Marie-Evelyne Lessard, Canadian actress
- Mario Lessard (born 1954), Canadian ice hockey player
- Prosper-Edmond Lessard (1873–1931), Canadian politician
- Raphaël Lessard (born 2001), Canadian racecar driver
- Raymond W. Lessard (1930–2016), American Catholic bishop
- Rick Lessard (born 1968), Canadian ice hockey player
- Stefan Lessard (born 1974), American musician
- Stéphane Lessard (born 1962), French ice hockey player
- Suzannah Lessard (born 1944), American writer
- Wayne Lessard (born 1956), Canadian politician
- Yves Lessard (born 1943), Canadian politician

== Places ==
- Lessard-et-le-Chêne, a French municipality in Calvados department
- Lessard-le-National, a French municipality in Saône-et-Loire department
- Lessard-en-Bresse, a French municipality in Saône-et-Loire department

== See also ==
- Lessard River (disambiguation)
