= Joep Nicolas =

Dutch-born French ecclesiastical artist (1897–1972)

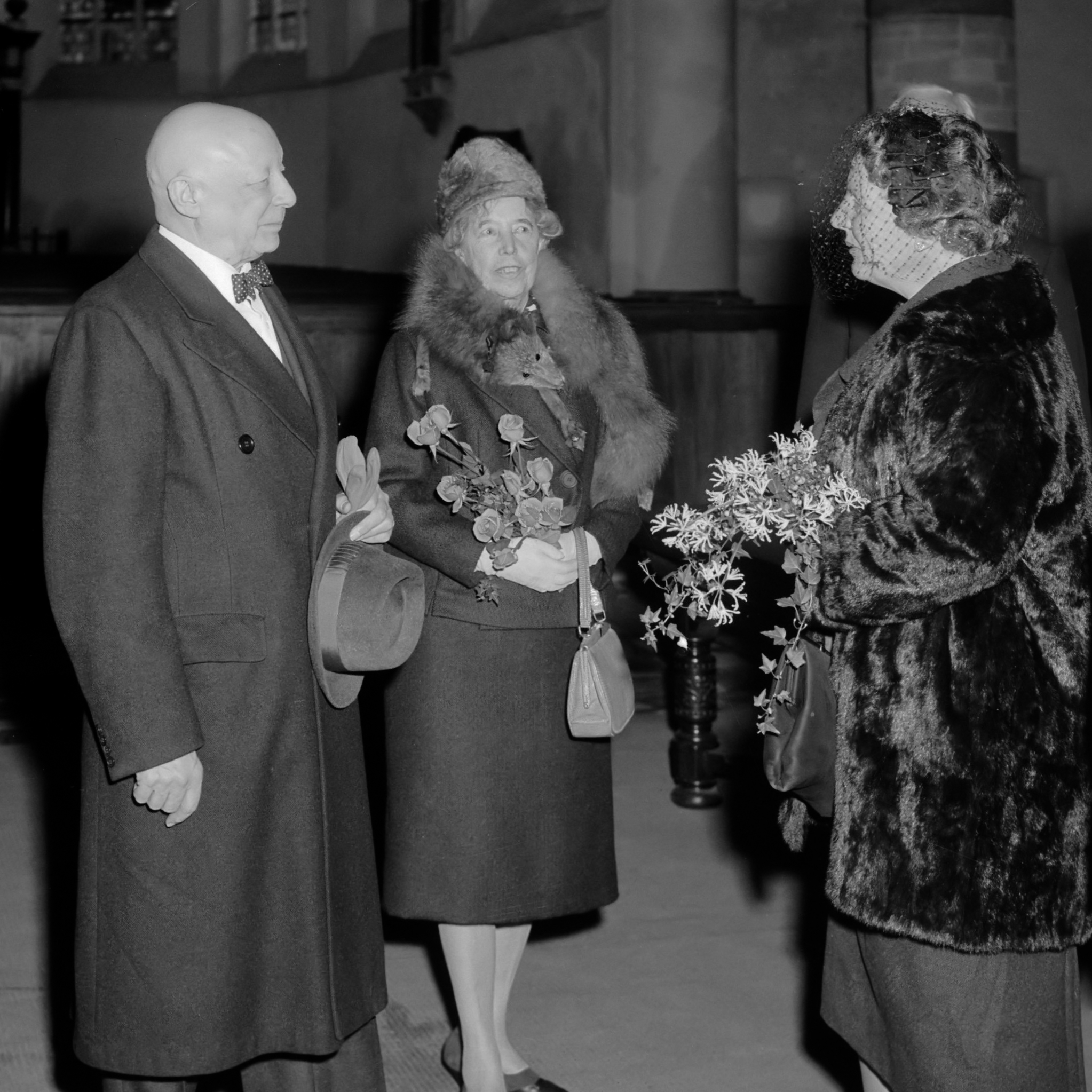
Joep Nicholas, mrs. A. Philips de Jongh and Queen Juliana (1960)

Joep Nicolas (Josephus Antonius Hubertus Franciscus Nicolas, October 6, 1897 – July 25, 1972) was a Dutch-born French ecclesiastical artist specializing in stained glass and sculpture. He was also a muralist, book illustrator, cartoonist, costume designer, and portrait painter.

Joep Nicolas (also spelled Joseph Nicholas) was born in Roermond (Limburg) in a French family whose stained glass atelier dated to his grandfather in 1855. He married Belgian sculptor Suzanne Nijs on April 26, 1924, in Belgium. In 1935, Nicolas applied for a patent for a glazing technique he described as vermurail.

Although frequently described as a refugee from the Nazi invasion of Holland, he arrived in the United States on December 30, 1939, with German ballet dancer Kurt Jooss (1901–1979), five months before the German invasion. He designed the December 1940 cover of Fortune Magazine.

Nicolas received grand prix awards for stained glass at Paris (1925), Milan (1933), and Brussels (1935), and he was a member of the art jury at the 1937 Paris World's Fair. He was associated with Rambusch Studios in New York City, and had his own office at 15 West 67th Street (now the Central Park Studios). Nicolas lived in Islip, New York.

His daughter Claire Theresia Nicolas White (1925–2020) was an American poet, novelist and translator of Dutch literature who married American sculptor Robert White. She was a niece of Aldous Huxley through his wife Maria Nijs and the granddaughter-in-law of architect Stanford White. Nicolas's daughter Hortensia Margaretha Maria Sylvia Nicolas was born on May 24, 1928, in the Netherlands and is also a stained glass artist.

Among Nicolas's glass students was Ambassador J. William Middendorf II.

Nicolas died on July 25, 1972, with his death recorded at the former American consulate in Rotterdam.

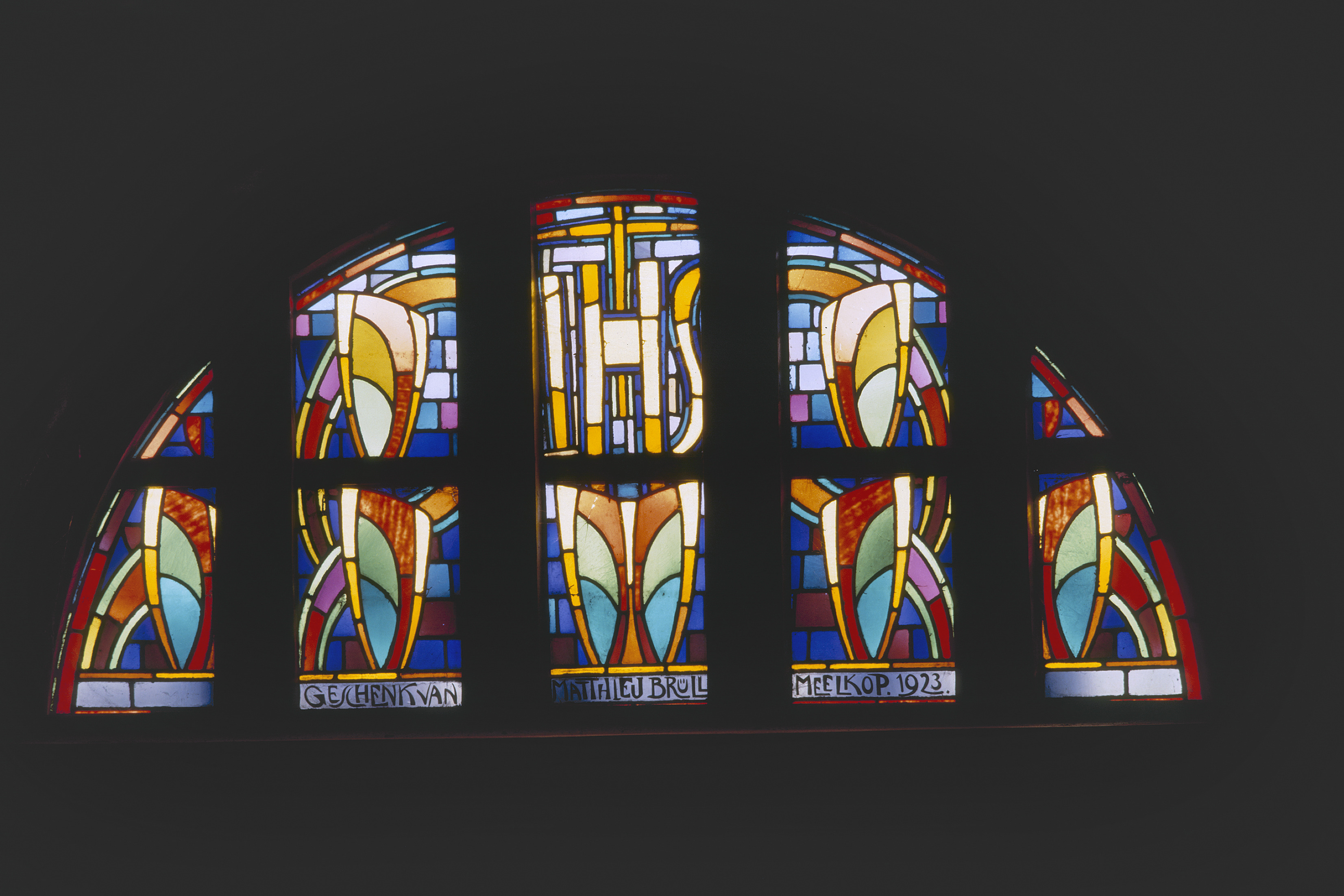
Eygelshoven

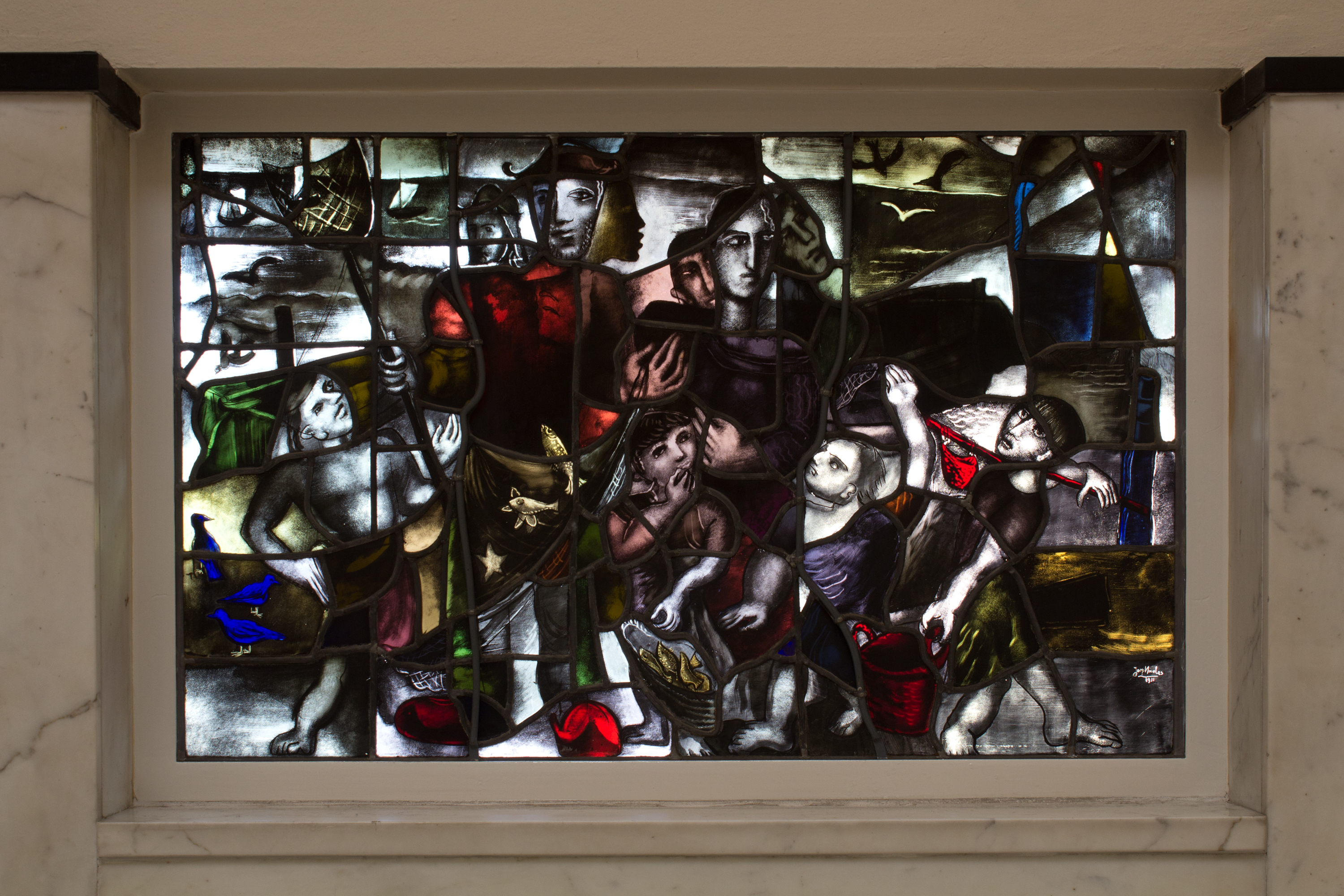
Hilversum

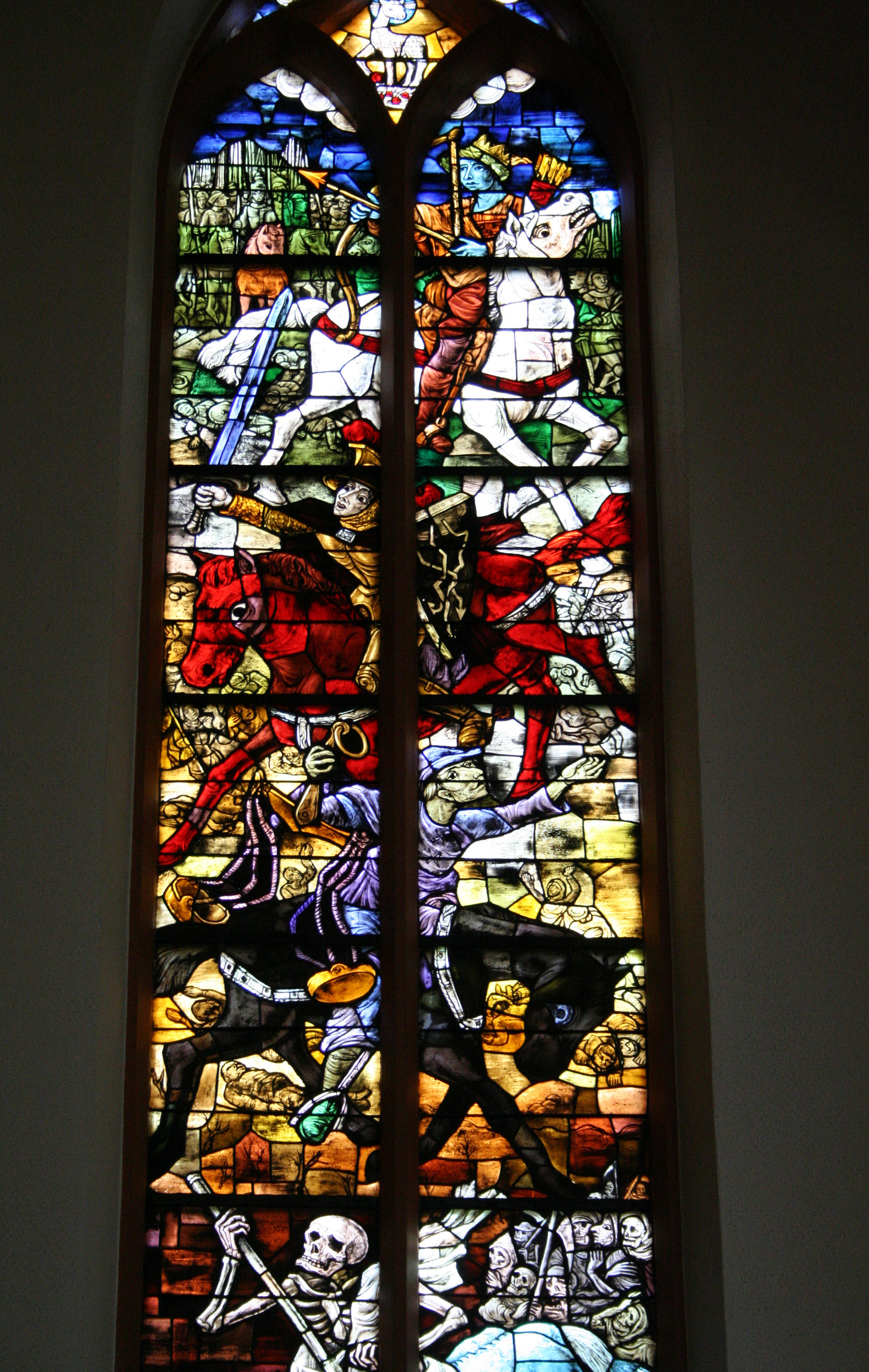
Tubbergen

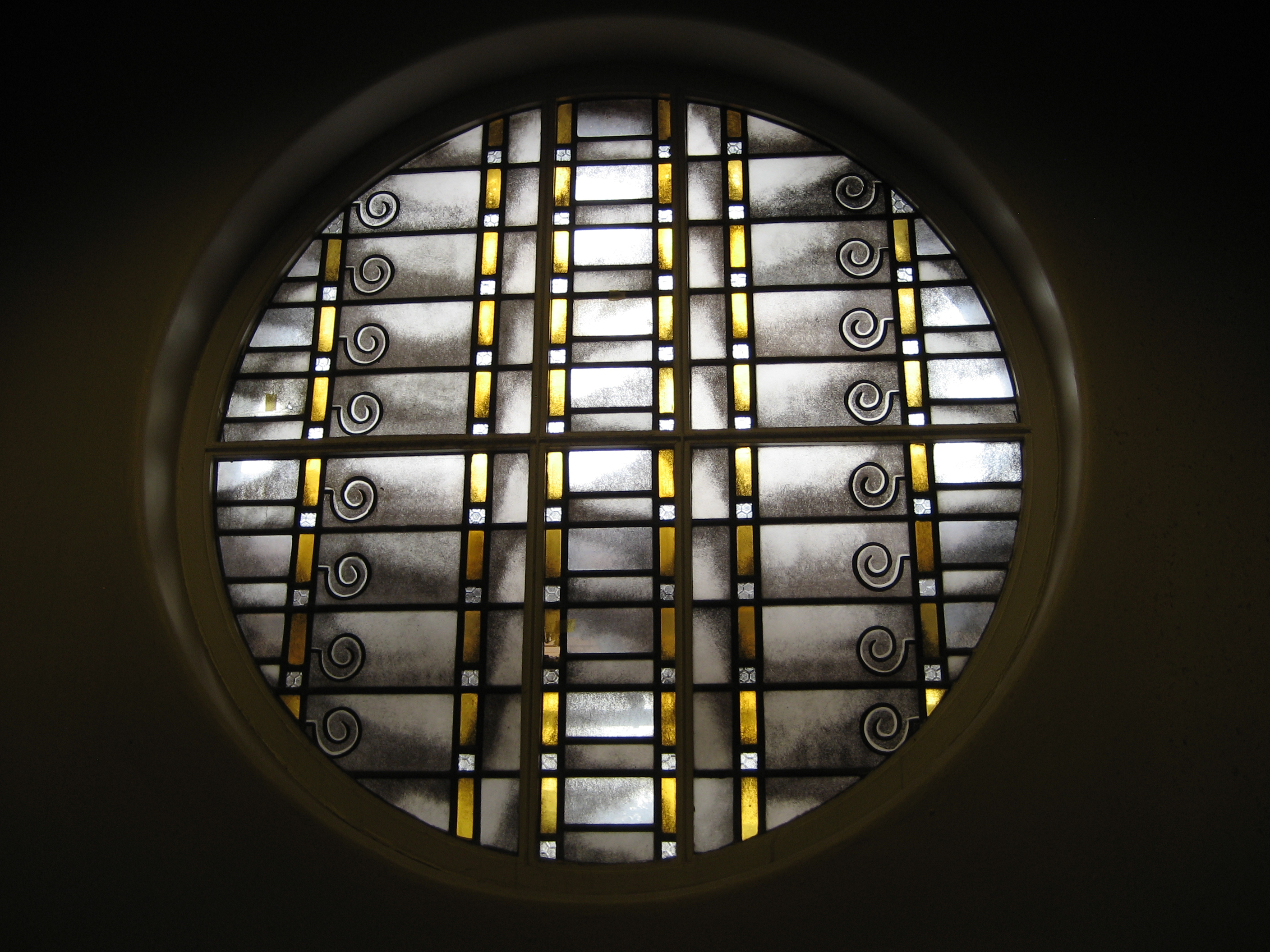
Leiden

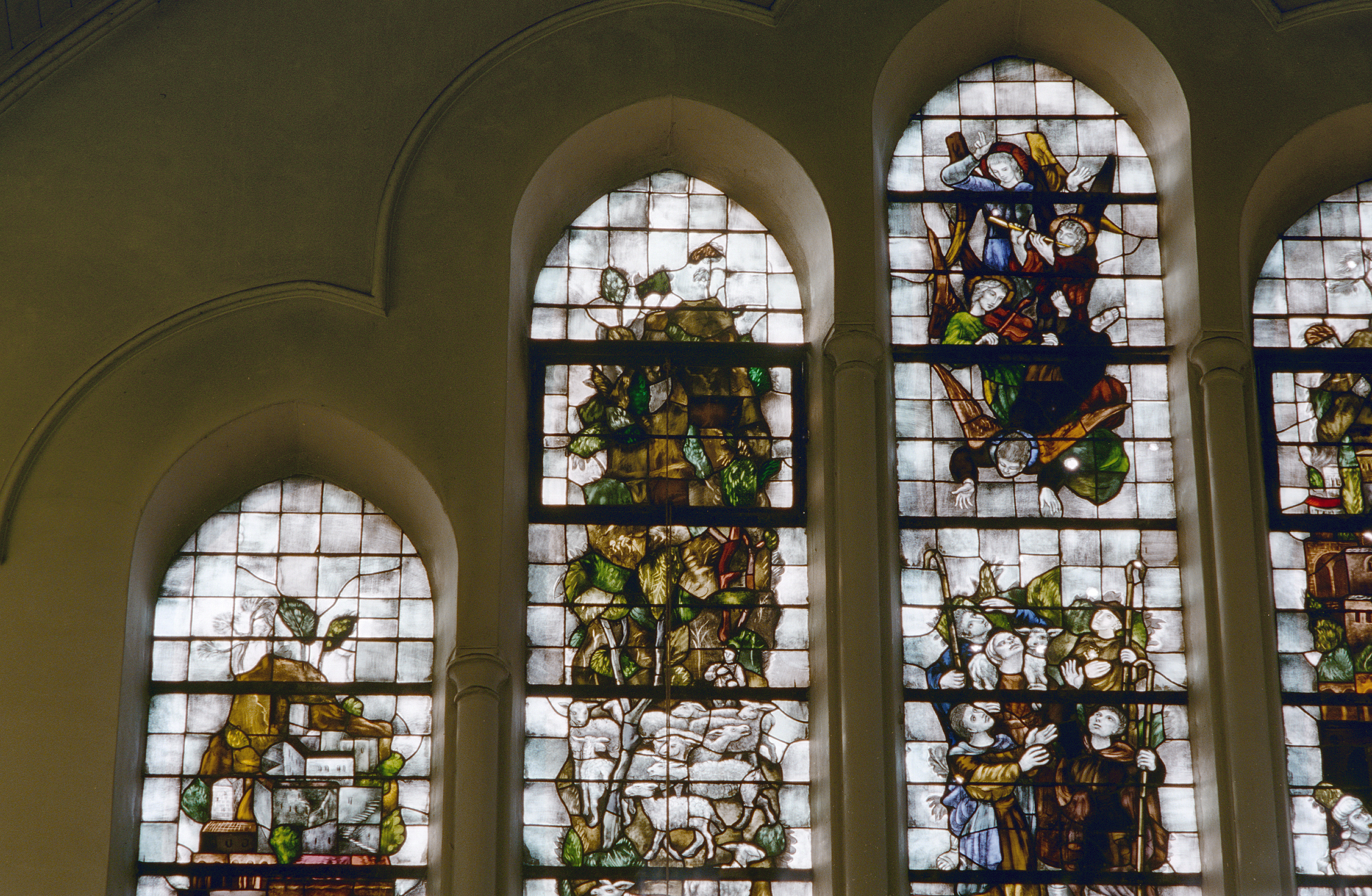
Arnhem

== Works ==
- Cartoons, "The Four Freedoms" (1944)
- Department store windows, Vroom & Dreesmann, Leiden (1936)
- Illustrator, Tristan and Iseult (Joseph Bédier, translated by Hilaire Belloc, 1927)
- Illustration, "Tobacco Land in Old New England" (1944)
- Mural, Home for Netherland Seamen (1938)
- Mural, Post Office, Coldwater, Ohio (1942)
- Portrait of Hendrik Willem van Loon, inscribed to "Mrs. Franklin Delano Roosevelt" (1941)
- Rood, Church of the Resurrection, Manhattan (1940)
- Stained glass with crucifixion, Vatican Museum (1932)
- Stained glass in stairwell, City Hall of Tilburg
- Windows, Brattleboro, Vermont
- Windows, Fairmount Presbyterian Church, Cleveland, Ohio
- Window, Oude Kerk, Delft
- Windows, Moose Lodge Child City Children's Cathedral House of God, Chicago, Illinois
- Windows, SS. Cyril and Methodius Church, Warren, Ohio
- Windows, St. Christoffelkathedraal, Roermond
- Windows, St. Francis Xavier Roman Catholic Church, Gettysburg, Pennsylvania (1953)
- Windows, St. John Bosco Chapel, New Orleans, Louisiana
- Windows, Trinity Episcopal Church, Southport, Connecticut
- Windows, Trinity Episcopal Church, Upperville, Virginia (Paul Mellon commission)
