= Robert White (sculptor) =

American sculptor

- Photograph of White, 1949.
- Born: Robert Winthrop White; September 19, 1921; St. James, New York, U.S.
- Died: September 21, 2002 (aged 81); Smithtown, New York, U.S.
- Education: Portsmouth Priory School; Rhode Island School of Design
- Known for: Sculpture
- Spouse: Claire Nicolas (m. 1947)

Robert Winthrop White (September 19, 1921 – September 21, 2002) was an American sculptor and educator who lived for much of his life in St. James, Long Island, New York. He was a grandson of the architect Stanford White.

== Early life ==
White was born in New York on September 19, 1921. He was the third of eight children born to architect Lawrence Grant White (1887–1956) and his wife, Laura Astor (née Chanler) White (1887–1984).

His father was the only surviving child of architect Stanford White. His mother was the eldest child of sportsman Winthrop Astor Chanler and Margaret Louisa (née Terry) Chanler, and a descendant of the Ward, Astor, Dudley–Winthrop, Livingston and Stuyvesant families.

He attended the Portsmouth Priory School (now Portsmouth Abbey School) in Rhode Island, and the Rhode Island School of Design.

== Career ==
He served in the United States Coast Guard during World War II and subsequently taught art at the Parsons School of Design from 1949-1952. He was a fellow of the American Academy in Rome from 1952 to 1955.

From 1967 to 1987, White was an associate professor of art at the State University of New York at Stony Brook. Over his artistic career, he created a substantial body of sculptural work, notably a series of evocative neo-classical figures in cast bronze and terra cotta which were shown at the James Graham & Sons Gallery and the Davis Galleries (later Davis and Langdale), both in Manhattan. Public sculptures include his 1983 statue John J. Pershing, General of the Armies, for Pershing Park (now the National World War I Memorial) in Washington, D.C.

He was also an illustrator for clients including Harper's Magazine, and before his death published two illustrated books of poetry, Casques and Dust on the Palace: The Story of a Friendship, published by Waterline Books in Hardwick, Massachusetts.

== Personal life ==
In August 1947, White was married to the American poet and Smith College graduate Claire Nicolas (b. 1925-deceased in 2020) at St. Mary's Roman Catholic Church in East Islip. Claire was the daughter of a Dutch stained-glass painter, Joep Nicolas, the niece of English writer and philosopher Aldous Huxley, and the cousin of Matthew Huxley. They lived at his grandfather's former Italianate mansion and subdivided 60-acre estate, known as Box Hill, on Long Island.

He died on September 21, 2002, at a hospital in Smithtown on Long Island. He was survived by his wife, two sons (Sebastian and Christian), one (Stephanie) of his two daughters, and seven grandchildren.
