= Lessard River =

Lessard River may refer to:

- Lessard River (Chaudière River tributary), Chaudière-Appalaches, Quebec, Canada
- Lessard River (rivière Franquelin Branche Ouest), Côte-Nord, Quebec, Canada

== See also ==
- Lessard (disambiguation)
