= Suzanne Nijs =

Dutch-Belgian sculptor

- Born: 6 April 1897 or 4 November 1902; Kortrijk, Belgium
- Died: 1 April 1985; Steyl, Netherlands
- Other name: Suzanna Melania Charlotta Maria Nicolas-Nijs
- Known for: Sculpture
- Spouse: Joep Nicolas
- Children: Claire Nicolas White

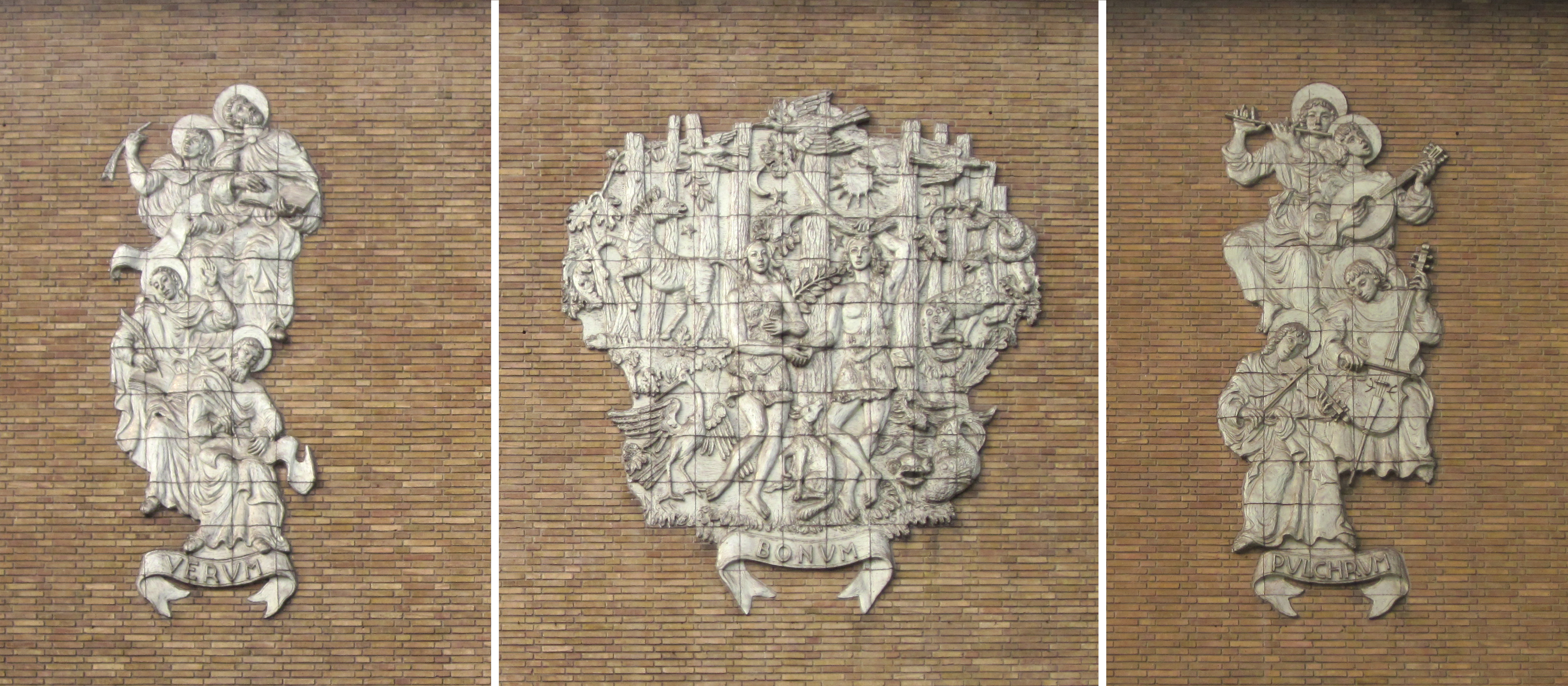
reliefs "Verum Bonum Pulchrum" made by Suzanne Nicolas-Nijs in 1938

Suzanna "Suzanne" Melania Charlotta Maria Nicolas Nijs or Suzanne Nicolas (1897 or 1902–1985) was a Dutch-Belgian sculptor.

== Biography ==
Nijs was born in Kortrijk, Belgium. Some sources state 6 April 1897 as her birth date and others state 4 November 1902. She studied at the Académie Royale des Beaux-Arts in Brussels. She was a student of Victor Rousseau. Her work was included in the 1939 exhibition and sale Onze Kunst van Heden (Our Art of Today) at the Rijksmuseum in Amsterdam.

In 1924 Nijs was married to the stained glass artist Joep Nicolas (1897–1972), with whom she had two children. Their daughter, Sylvia Nicolas became a stained glass artist. The family spent time in France, Italy, Scotland, and the United States as well as Belgium and the Netherlands.

Nijs died on 1 April 1985 in Steyl.
