= John J. Pershing General of the Armies =

Statue in Washington, D.C., U.S.

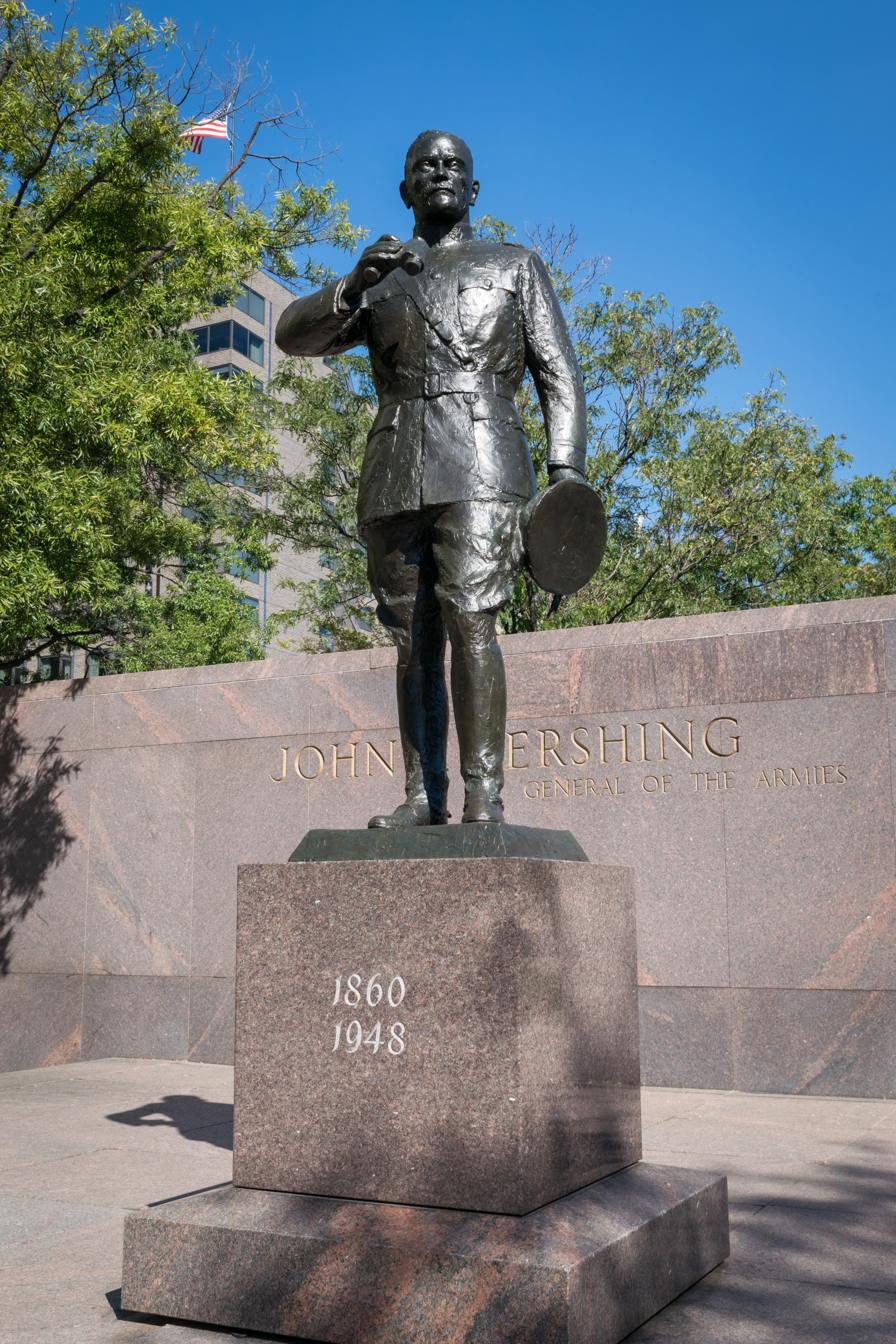
- Artist: Robert White
- Year: 1983
- Type: Bronze
- Dimensions: 270 cm × 71 cm × 71 cm (108 in × 28 in × 28 in)
- Location: Washington, D.C., U.S.; 38°53′45.1″N 77°1′56.7″W
- Owner: National Park Service

John J. Pershing General of the Armies, is a public artwork by American artist Robert White, located at the National World War I Memorial in Washington, D.C.. The monument is a tribute to United States Army general John J. Pershing.

John J. Pershing General of the Armies was originally surveyed as part of the Smithsonian's Save Outdoor Sculpture! survey in 1994.

== Description ==
The sculpture shows General Pershing standing with his head slightly turned, as if overseeing a battlefield in front of him. His proper right hand raises binoculars to his eyes and his proper left hand holds his hat at his side. Wearing a World War I uniform with knickerbockers, tall boots and a long belted jacket, he steps forward with his proper left foot.

Resting on a square of red granite (51 × 53 × 53 in.) in a small plaza, the sculpture is flanked by two tall granite walls.

The front of the rear wall is inscribed (rear wall: H. 10 ft. W. 3 ft. L. 31 1/2 ft.):

JOHN J. PERSHING
GENERAL OF THE ARMIES.

The back of the rear wall is inscribed:

IN THEIR DEVOTION, THEIR VALOR, AND IN THE LOYAL FULFILLMENT OF THEIR
OBLIGATIONS, THE OFFICERS AND MEN OF THE AMERICAN EXPEDITIONARY FORCES
HAVE LEFT A HERITAGE OF WHICH THOSE WHO FOLLOW MAY EVER BE PROUD
JOHN J. PERSHING
(Pershing's signature)

The front left wall, which is divided into four sections features an extensive text regarding Pershing's involvement in the Western Front, his leadership in First United States Army, the signing of the Armistice with Germany, the Meuse-Argonne Offensive, and an inscription reading (H. 10 ft. W. 3 ft. L. 49 ft.):

ERECTED BY:
AMERICAN BATTLE MONUMENTS COMMISSION
WALLACE K. HARRISON ARCHITECT
FREDERICK (...transcription illegible)
ENGINEER
ROBERT WHITE SCULPTOR
1983

== Information ==
Authorized by Congress on April 2, 1956, the American Battle Monuments Commission paid the $400,000 for the park. The sculpture was dedicated in October 1983.

== Condition ==
This sculpture was surveyed in 1994 for its condition and was described as "well maintained."
