= Claire Nicolas White =

American poet, novelist, and translator (1925–2020)

Claire Nicolas White (June 18, 1925 – May 26, 2020) was an American poet, novelist and translator of Dutch literature. She was a niece of Aldous Huxley and the granddaughter-in-law of architect Stanford White.

== Life ==
White was born in Groet, Netherlands, the daughter of Joep Nicolas, a Dutch stained-glass artist who emigrated to America just before World War II, and Suzanne Nijs, a Dutch-Belgian sculptor. She grew up in the European exile community in New York City. Her husband, the sculptor Robert White, was a grandson of Stanford White.

White's literary papers are held by Stony Brook University.

== Works ==
=== Translations ===
- (tr. with Louise Varèse) The Time of Our Lives (Journal d'une petite fille) by Martine Rouchaud, 1946.
- The Assault by Harry Mulisch, 1985. Translated from the Dutch.
- A Night in May (La Nuit de mai) by Alfred de Musset, 1989. Translated from the French.
- A Letter of Time by Hans van de Waarsenburg, 1989. Translated from the Dutch (5 of the 7 poems).
- The Vanishing by Tim Krabbé, 1993. Translated from the Dutch.
- My Father's War: A Novel by Adriaan van Dis, 1996. Translated from the Dutch.

=== Other ===
- Joep Nicolas: leven en werk, 1979
- The Bridge, 1987
- River Boy, 1988
- Fragments of stained glass, 1989
- (ed.) Stanford White: Letters to His Family : including a selection of letters to Augustus Saint-Gaudens, 1997
