= Suzannah Lessard =

American writer of literary nonfiction (born 1944)

- Born: Suzannah Terry Lessard; December 1, 1944; New York, U.S.
- Died: January 29, 2026 (aged 81); New York City, U.S.
- Occupation: Writer
- Spouse(s): Noel Brennan; David Soeiro
- Parent(s): John Ayres Lessard; Alida Mary White
- Relatives: Stanford White (great-grandfather)
- Writing career
- Genre: Non-fiction
- Notable awards: Whiting Award (1995)

Suzannah Terry Lessard (December 1, 1944 – January 29, 2026) was an American writer of literary nonfiction. Lessard served as a staff writer for The New Yorker and one of the original editors of the Washington Monthly. Throughout her nearly 50 years as a writer and editor, Lessard wrote two memoirs, reportorial pieces, essays, and opinion pieces both personally and professionally.

== Early life and career ==
Lessard was born on December 1, 1944, to John Ayres Lessard and Alida Mary Lessard (née White). Her birthplace is reported variously as Islip, New York, or Smithtown, New York. She is the great-granddaughter of architect Stanford White. She has taught at Columbia School of the Arts, Wesleyan University, The New School, George Mason University, George Washington University, and Goucher College.

She was one of the first editors of the Washington Monthly from 1971 to 1974. For 20 years she was a staff writer at The New Yorker. She has also published in The New York Times Magazine, Architectural Record, Architectural Digest, The Wilson Quarterly and Harvard Design Magazine.

== Personal life and death ==
Lessard was the great-granddaughter of Stanford White, the architect who designed Madison Square Garden. She was also one of five sisters who grew up in a cottage on Long Island, which was owned by the family since the 17th century. In her 1996 memoir The Architect of Desire, she recounts that on New Year's Day, 1989, after much inner turmoil, she gathered with her siblings, who all recounted being abused by their father.

She married David Soeiro, an attorney, in 1974. They had a son, Julian Soeiro. Lessard and Soeiro later divorced. Lessard later married Noel Brennan, and resided in New York with her, until Lessard's death.

Lessard died from complications of endometrial cancer at a hospital in Manhattan, New York, on January 29, 2026, at the age of 81.

== Awards and honors ==
- 1995 Whiting Award
- 2003 Mark Lynton History Prize, Mapping the New World: An Inquiry into the Meaning of Sprawl

=== Fellowships ===
- 2001–2002 Fellowship at the Woodrow Wilson International Center for Scholars in Washington, D.C.
- 2002–2003 Jenny McKean Moore Fellowship for creative non-fiction, at George Washington University

== Works ==
Lessard was the author of the critically acclaimed memoir, The Architect of Desire: Beauty and Danger in the Stanford White Family (1996).

Her next book, The View From a Small Mountain: Reading the American Landscape, was published in 2017.

In 2019, Lessard published The Absent Hand: Reimagining Our American Landscape, which Michael Kimmelman described as "thoughtful, exquisitely written collection of interconnected essays".

=== Anthologies ===
- Elaine Greene, ed. (2006). "The Luxury of Order". If These Walls Could Talk: Thoughts of Home. Sterling Publishing Company, Inc. ISBN 978-1-58816-611-1.
