= Box Hill Estate =

Historic house in New York, United States

- U.S. National Register of Historic Places
- U.S. Historic district
- Location within New York Location within the United States
- Nearest city: St. James, New York
- Coordinates: 40°53′22″N 73°10′36″W
- Area: 20 acres (8.1 ha)
- Built: 1885
- Architect: White, Stanford
- Architectural style: Neo-Colonial
- NRHP reference No.: 73001276
- Added to NRHP: December 4, 1973

Box Hill Estate is a national historic district located in St. James in Suffolk County, New York. The district encompasses an estate that includes five contributing buildings and one contributing structure. The estate house was the summer home of Stanford White. It was built in 1885 and is a rambling, multi-gabled structure surfaced in pebblestone dashed stucco. It features a one-story verandah defined by a range of fluted columns. Also on the property are a contributing cottage, barn, carriage house, stable, and water tower.

It was added to the National Register of Historic Places in 1973.
