= Smithtown, New York =

- Town
- Town of Smithtown
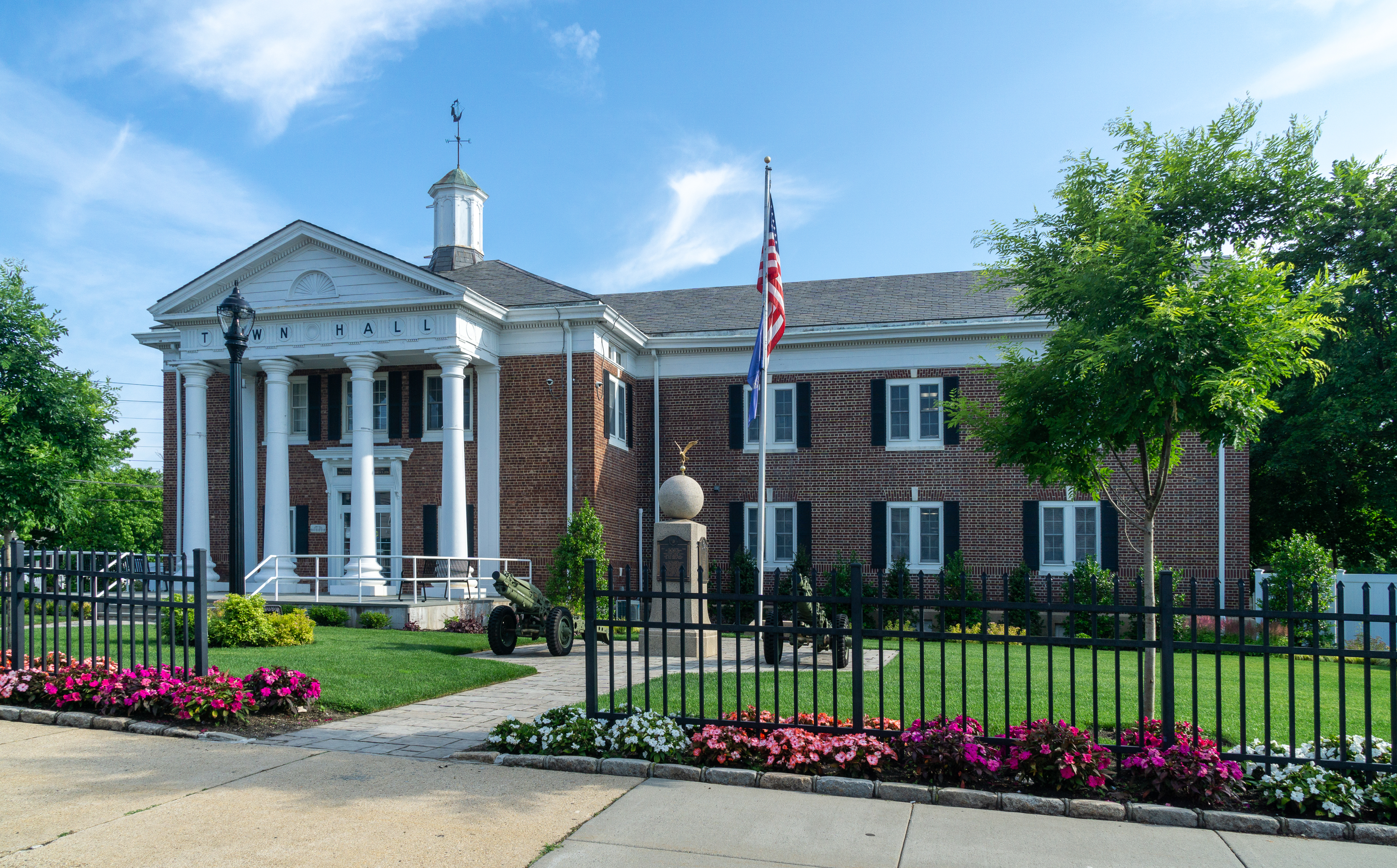
- Town Hall

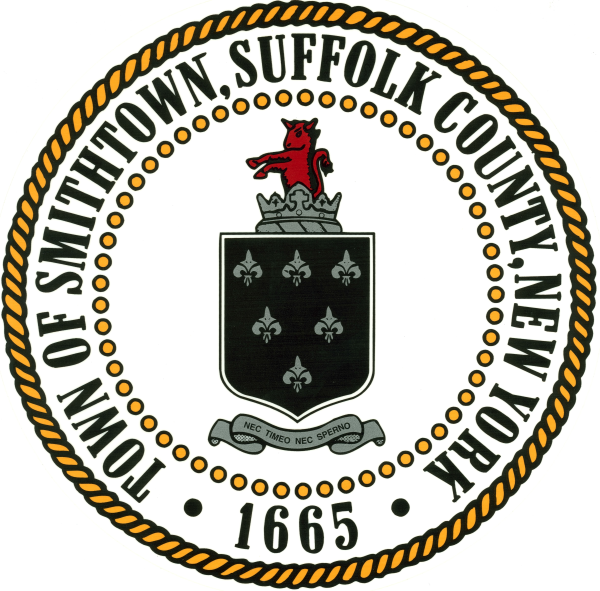
- Flag Seal

- Location in Suffolk County
- Coordinates: 40°51′46″N 73°12′55″W
- Country: United States
- State: New York
- County: Suffolk
- First settled: 1665; 361 years ago
- Incorporated as a town: March 7, 1788; 238 years ago

Government
  - Town Supervisor: Edward Wehrheim (R)
  - Town Council: Thomas McCarthy (R); Lynne Nowick (R); Lisa Inzerillo (R); Thomas Lohmann (R)

Area
  - Total: 111.44 sq mi (288.64 km^{2})
  - Land: 53.75 sq mi (139.21 km^{2})
  - Water: 57.70 sq mi (149.43 km^{2})
- Elevation: 105 ft (32 m)

Population (2020)
  - Total: 116,296
  - Density: 2,163.6/sq mi (835.4/km^{2})
- Time zone: UTC−5 (EST)
  - Summer (DST): UTC−4 (EDT)
- ZIP codes: 11725, 11745, 11754, 11755 (part), 11768 (part), 11779 (part), 11780, 11787, 11788
- Area codes: 631, 934
- FIPS code: 36-68000
- Cook PVI: R+24
- Website: www.smithtownny.gov

Smithtown is a town in Suffolk County, New York, on the Northshore of Long Island. It is part of the New York metropolitan area. The population was 116,296 at the 2020 Census.

The census-designated place (CDP) of Smithtown lies within the town's borders.

== History ==
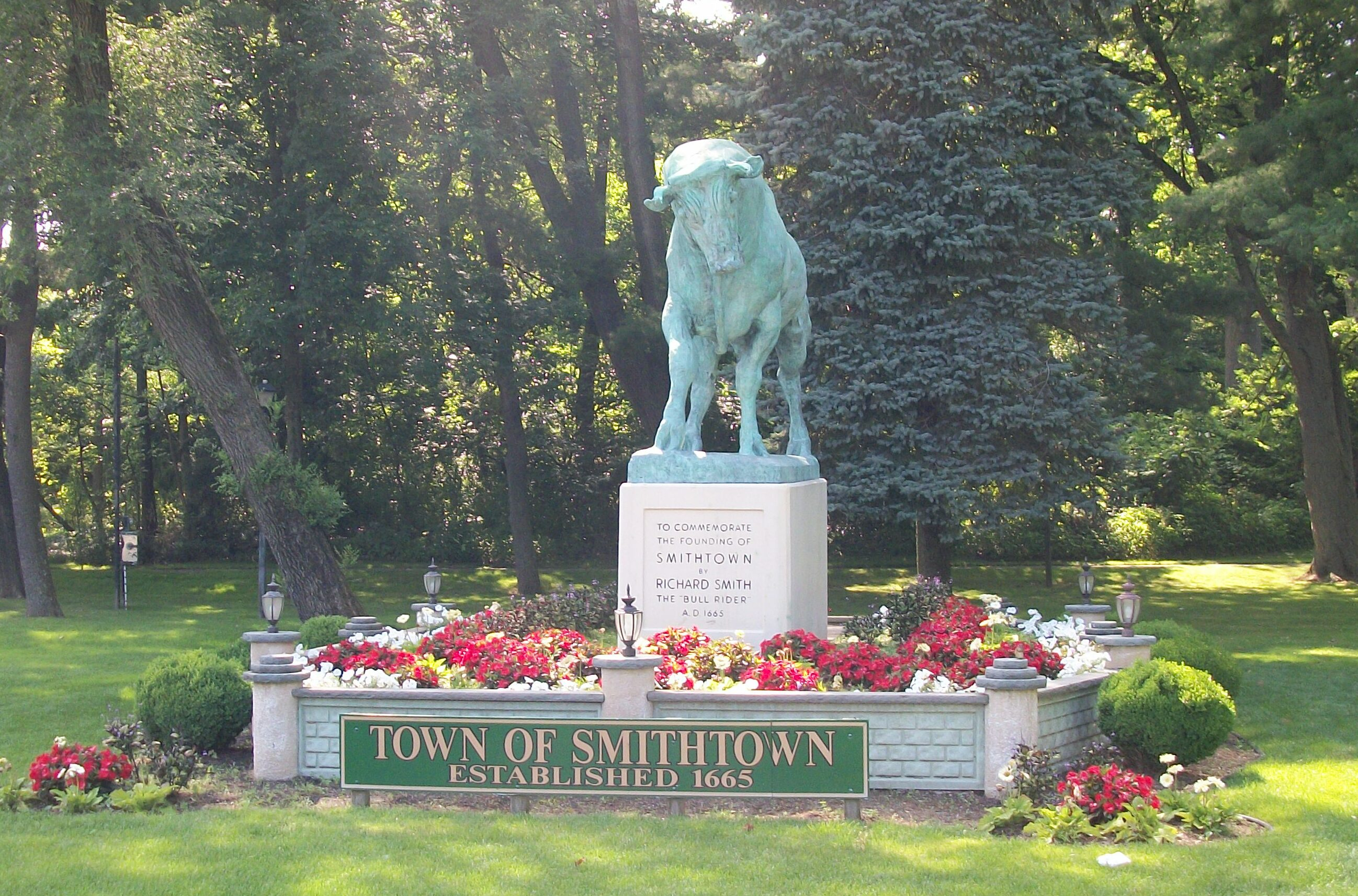
Statue of the Smithtown Bull that Richard Smith was said to have ridden in order to claim the land that became the Town of Smithtown

The land that would become the town was previously inhabited by the Nissequogue Native Americans.

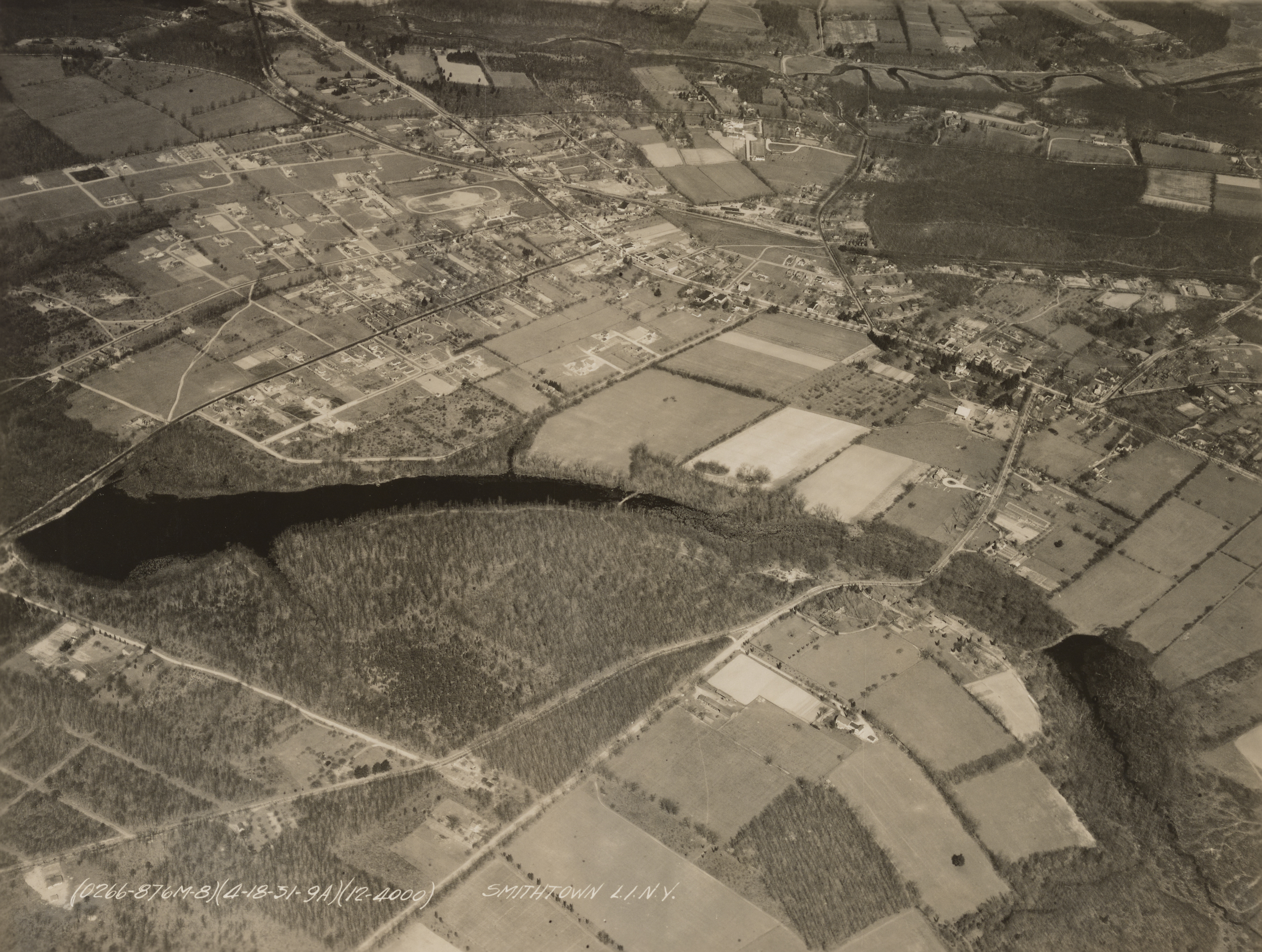
Smithtown in 1931

=== Local legend ===
An oft-repeated but apocryphal story has it that, after rescuing a Native American chief's abducted daughter, Richard Smith was told that the chief would grant title to all of the land Smith could encircle in one day while riding a bull. Smith chose to ride the bull on the longest day of the year (summer solstice) 1665, to enable him to ride longer "in one day." The land he acquired in this way is said to approximate the current town's borders. A large statue of Smith's bull, known as Whisper, pays homage to the legend at the fork of Jericho Turnpike (New York State Route 25) and St. Johnland Road (New York State Route 25A).

=== Actual founding ===
According to local historians, the bull story is a myth. It was actually English settler Lion Gardiner who had helped rescue the daughter of Nissequogue Grand Sachem Wyandanch, after she was kidnapped by rival Narragansetts. Smith, who lived in nearby Setauket, was a friend of Gardiner; it was at Smith's house where the Nissequogue princess was returned to Wyandanch. The Grand Sachem awarded a large tract of land to Gardiner as a gesture of gratitude. In 1663 Gardiner sold the Nissequogue lands to Smith. Two years later, colonial Governor Richard Nicolls recognized the sale by awarding Smith “The Nicolls Patent of 1665,” which formally ratified Smith's claim to the land. Thus, 1665 is considered the founding date of the town.

Smithtown was originally known as "Smithfield".

The border between Smithtown and the town of Huntington is partially defined by Bread and Cheese Hollow Road (Suffolk County Road 4), so named after Bread and Cheese hollow, which according to legend is where Smith stopped on his ride to have a lunch of bread and cheese. The road is reputed to follow part of his original ride. The border between Smithtown and Huntington was also the site of Fort Salonga, a British fort that was the site of a battle of the American Revolution during 1781. The Smithtown hamlet of Nesconset was the home of Spaceplex, an indoor amusement park and arcade that was falsely accused of being the abduction site in the Katie Beers kidnapping case in 1992.

=== 350th anniversary ===
In 2015, the town celebrated its 350th anniversary with the unveiling of a new statue of founder Richard Smith, in front of an office building at the intersection of Main Street and Route 111.

== Geography ==
Smithtown is bounded by Long Island Sound to the north, Islip to the south, Brookhaven to the east, and Huntington to the west.

According to the United States Census Bureau, the town has a total area of 111.5 square miles (289 km^{2}), of which 53.8 square miles (139 km^{2}) is land and 57.7 square miles (149 km^{2}) (51.75%) is water.

== Demographics ==
Historical population
Census	Pop.	Note	%±
1790	1,022		—
1800	1,413		38.3%
1810	1,592		12.7%
1820	1,874		17.7%
1830	1,686		−10.0%
1840	1,932		14.6%
1850	1,972		2.1%
1860	2,130		8.0%
1870	2,136		0.3%
1880	2,249		5.3%
1890	3,357		49.3%
1900	5,863		74.6%
1910	7,073		20.6%
1920	9,114		28.9%
1930	11,855		30.1%
1940	13,970		17.8%
1950	20,993		50.3%
1960	50,347		139.8%
1970	114,657		127.7%
1980	116,663		1.7%
1990	113,406		−2.8%
2000	115,715		2.0%
2010	117,801		1.8%
2020	116,296		−1.3%
U.S. Decennial Census

As of the census of 2000, there were 115,715 people, 38,487 households, and 31,482 families residing in the town. The population density was 2,159.9 inhabitants per square mile (833.9/km^{2}). There were 39,357 housing units at an average density of 734.6 per square mile (283.6/km^{2}). The racial makeup of the town was:

- 114,817 or 99.2% mono-racial
- 110,546 or 95.51% White
- 748 or 0.65% Black or African American,
- 78 or 0.01% Native American
- 1,763 or 1.7% Asian
- 22 or less than 0.01% Pacific Islander
- 660 or 0.6% from other races
- 898 or 0.8% from two or more races.
- 3,855 or 3.3% Hispanic or Latino

There were 38,487 households, out of which 38.5% had children under the age of 18 living with them, 71.6% were married couples living together, 7.5% had a female householder with no husband present, and 18.2% were non-families. 15.2% of all households were made up of individuals, and 7.2% had someone living alone who was 65 years of age or older. The average household size was 2.95 and the average family size was 3.28.

In the town, the population was spread out, with 26.0% under the age of 18, 5.4% from 18 to 24, 30.4% from 25 to 44, 24.8% from 45 to 64, and 13.4% who were 65 years of age or older. The median age was 38 years. For every 100 females, there were 94.6 males. For every 1000 females age 18 and over, there were 911.2 males.

According to a 2007 estimate, the median income for a household in the town was $100,165, and the median income for a family was $110,776.

Males had a median income of $61,348 versus $38,208 for females. The per capita income for the town was $31,401. About 2.1% of families and 3.0% of the population were below the poverty line, including 2.9% of those under age 18 and 4.7% of those age 65 or over.

Ancestries: Italian (35.3%), Irish (26.0%), German (18.7%), Polish (6.9%), English (5.0%), Russian (4.1%).

== Government and politics ==
Current Town Board as of January 1, 2024
Town Clerk / Registrar	Councilwoman	Councilman	Supervisor	Councilwoman	Councilman	Receiver of Taxes
Thomas D. McCarthy (R) since January 1, 2024	Lynne Nowick (R) since January 1, 2014	Thomas J. McCarthy (R) since January 1, 1998	Edward Wehrheim (R) since January 1, 2018	Lisa Inzerillo (R) since January 1, 2015	Thomas W. Lohmann (R) since January 10, 2018	Deanna Varricchio (R) since January 1, 2002

The present town hall and seat of the town was built in 1912 on Main Street in Smithtown.

In 2015 the town hall was dedicated and renamed after former Supervisor Patrick R. Vecchio.

Smithtown is led by a Town Supervisor and a four-member Town Council, elected town-wide with each serving four year terms. Elections are held in odd-numbered years, with two of the councilmembers being up for re-election each year.

The current Supervisor is Edward Wehrheim who has been Town Supervisor since 2018. His predecessor, Patrick Vecchio was in office for forty years, the longest elected town supervisor in the history of the United States. Elected as a Democrat during a special election, Vecchio switched parties in 1993 in an attempt to run for County Executive. Although defeated in the primary by Robert Gaffney, Vecchio remained a Republican until his death in 2019. He is the longest serving town supervisor in all of New York State. Vecchio ran in 2013 against former Councilman Robert Creighton, of the Conservative Party. Supervisor Vecchio won the Republican Primary against Councilman Creighton and then later defeated the Councilman in the General Election 45-30%. The Democratic candidate, Steven Snair received 25% of the vote. Councilman Creighton was later ousted in 2015 by Lisa Inzerillo. In the 2017 Republican primary, then-Councilman Ed Wehrheim received about forty votes more than Vecchio. The race was too close to call and a recount was demanded by Vecchio. Following the recount a week later, Wehrheim was declared the winner, nearly doubling his lead. Vecchio conceded the race the same day saying "“All good things come to an end." On November 7, 2017, Ed Wehrheim defeated William Holst in the election for the town's next supervisor. Wehrheim succeeded Vecchio on January 1, 2018. On January 10, 2018, Thomas Lohmann was appointed to the seat vacated by Wehrheim's election.

The Town of Smithtown has always been dominated by Republicans at all levels of government. This one-party domination has often led to infighting between factions of the Republican Party in Smithtown with the most recent between Supervisor Vecchio and Smithtown Republican Party Chairman William Ellis. In recent times the Republican party has dominated the Town Board; the last Democratic Town Supervisor being Mr. Vecchio. The most Republican areas for Smithtown are its three incorporated villages, Nissequogue, Head of the Harbor, and the Branch, along with the hamlets of Smithtown and Kings Park. The weakest areas for the Republican party in Smithtown is the edges of the Town in the hamlets of Commack and Hauppauge. In 2016, Donald Trump defeated Hillary Clinton by a margin of 25 percent. Democratic County Executive Steve Bellone has won the town, in two of his three runs for that office.

In addition to presidential politics, the Town of Smithtown is also the power bases of many State and County elected officials. The former New York State Senate Majority Leader John J. Flanagan had the bulk of his district located in Smithtown. Current Republican Comptroller John M. Kennedy, Jr., along with his wife, Suffolk County Legislator Leslie Kennedy both reside in Nesconset.

Former Supervisor Vecchio died on April 6, 2019, at the age of 88.

Town of Smithtown, New York vote by party in presidential elections
Year	Republican	Democratic
2020	58% 42,051	40% 28,946
2016	61% 35,931	36% 20,552
2012	60.17% 32,549	39.83% 21,544
2008	56.85% 34,409	43.15% 26,114
2004	56.41% 33,686	43.59% 26,034

Town of Smithtown, Supervisor election results
Year	Candidate		Vote	%
2021	(R)	Edward Wehrheim ✓	21,095	73.9
2021	(D)	Maria Scheuring	7,453	26.1
2017	(R)	Edward Wehrheim ✓	16,268	56.8
2017	(D)	William Holst	10,047	35.0
2017	(I)	Kristen Slevin	2,250	8.2
2013	(R)	Patrick Vecchio ✓	9,507	45.08
2013	(C)	Robert Creighton	6,366	30.18
2013	(D)	Steve Snair	5,218	24.74
2009	(R)	Patrick Vecchio ✓	11,049	60.35
2009	(D)	Patricia Biancaniello	7,051	38.51
2009	(WF)	Deanna DeLieto	208	1.14
2005	(R)	Patrick Vecchio ✓	12,370	55.52
2005	(D)	William Holst	5,981	26.84
2005	(I)	Jane Conway	3,929	17.63

== Communities and locations ==
=== Villages (incorporated) ===
- Head of the Harbor
- Nissequogue
- Village of the Branch
- Village of the Landing (former; dissolved 1939)

=== Hamlets (unincorporated) ===
- Commack (in part, with the Town of Huntington)
- Fort Salonga (in part, with the Town of Huntington)
- Hauppauge (in part, with the Town of Islip)
- Kings Park
- Lake Ronkonkoma (in part with the Town of Brookhaven and Town of Islip)
- Nesconset
- Smithtown
- St. James

The now-defunct hamlet of Flowerfield is also listed in the official New York State Gazetteer, maintained and published by the New York State Department of Health, which includes numerous defunct hamlets and towns, some with alternate or archaic spellings.

=== Other communities ===
- North Smithtown
- San Remo
- Smithtown Pines

=== State parks ===
- Caleb Smith State Park Preserve, a state park southwest of Smithtown village
- Sunken Meadow State Park
- Nissequogue River State Park
- Blydenburgh Park Historic District

== Media and culture ==
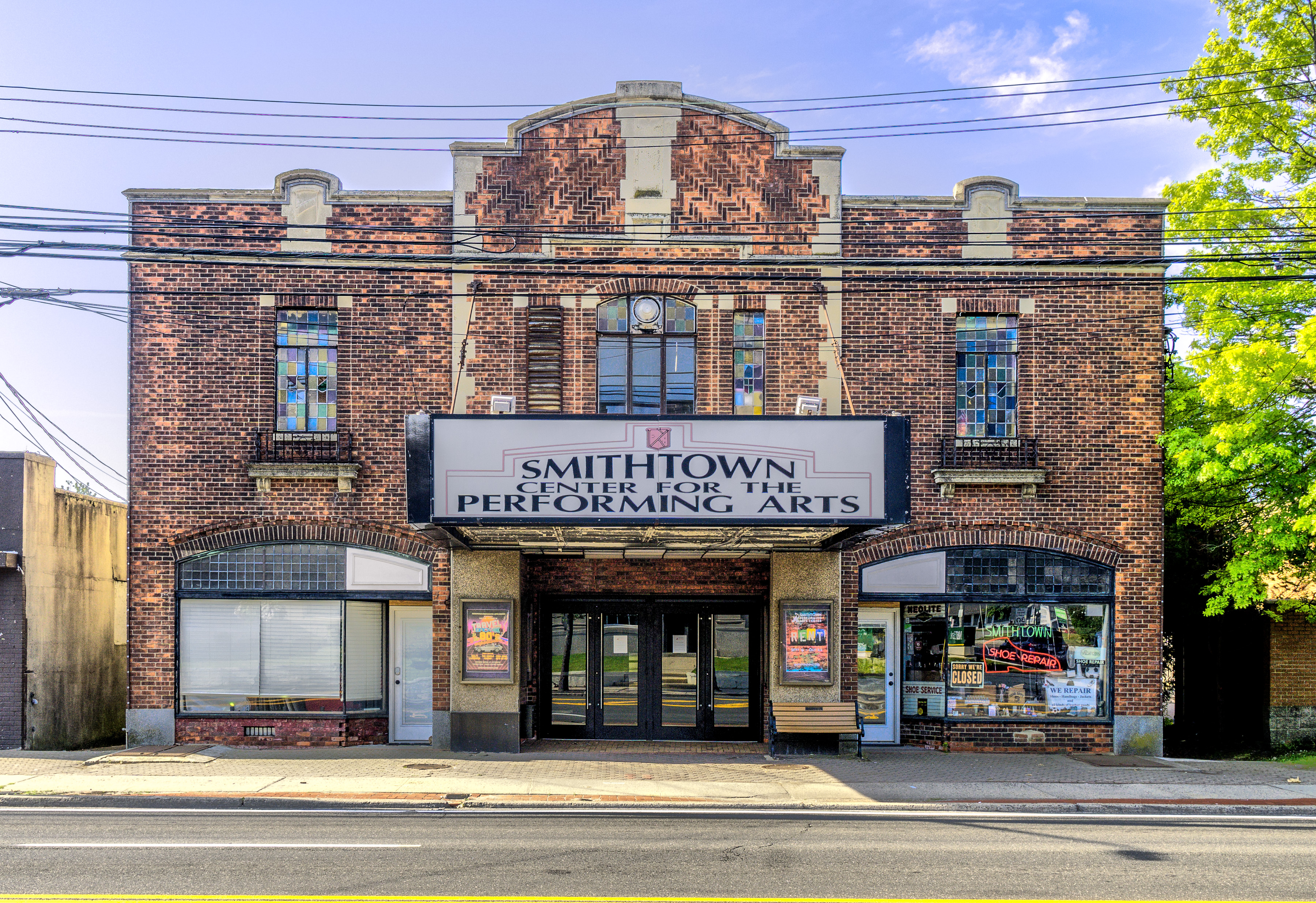
Smithtown Performing Arts Center

Smithtown broadcasts its board meetings on SGTV, the Town of Smithtown's public service television station; Optimum channel 18 or Verizon Fios channel 27. The Times of Smithtown newspaper carries community-based articles.

The Smithtown Performing Arts Center is a theater at 2 East Main Street. The historic building has not been significantly visually altered since it was built in 1933. It operated as a movie theater from 1933 to November 2001, and was renovated and restored to accommodate live performances in 2002. In 2022 the building was purchased by the nonprofit Smithtown Performing Arts Council, which programs a variety of live entertainment and community events including musicals, plays, music, comedy, educational classes. and summer camps.

== Emergency services ==
Fire Protection and Emergency Medical Services are provided by the seven Volunteer Fire Departments, and two Volunteer Ambulance Corps that cover parts of the Township. The Smithtown, Kings Park, Saint James, Nesconset, and Nissequogue Fire Departments provide both Fire Protection, as well as Emergency Medical Services to their districts. The Commack Fire Department and Commack Volunteer Ambulance Corps provide coverage for the Commack hamlet, which is divided between the Town of Smithtown, and the Town of Huntington. The Hauppauge Volunteer Fire Department and Central Islip-Hauppauge Volunteer Ambulance Corps provide coverage to the Hauppauge hamlet, which is divided between the Town of Smithtown, and the Town of Islip.

Smithtown is policed by the 4th Precinct of the Suffolk County Police Department. The Suffolk County Police are the primary law enforcement agency in Smithtown. They are responsible for responding to all 911 emergency calls. The Smithtown Department of Public Safety is an agency with limited powers. The Park Ranger Division is made up peace officers as defined in the Criminal Procedural Law of the state of New York. Their enforcement powers are limited to Smithtown town property. The Department of Public Safety also has a Harbor Master division and Fire Marshall division.

Emergency medical care can be found at St. Catherine of Siena Medical Center, located in Smithtown, as well as the nearby Stony Brook University Hospital, located in Stony Brook, in the neighboring Town of Brookhaven.

== Transportation ==
=== Railroad lines ===
The Town of Smithtown is also home to the Kings Park, Smithtown, and Saint James stations of the Long Island Rail Road's Port Jefferson Branch.

=== Bus service ===
The Town of Smithtown is served entirely by Suffolk County Transit bus routes.

=== Major roads ===
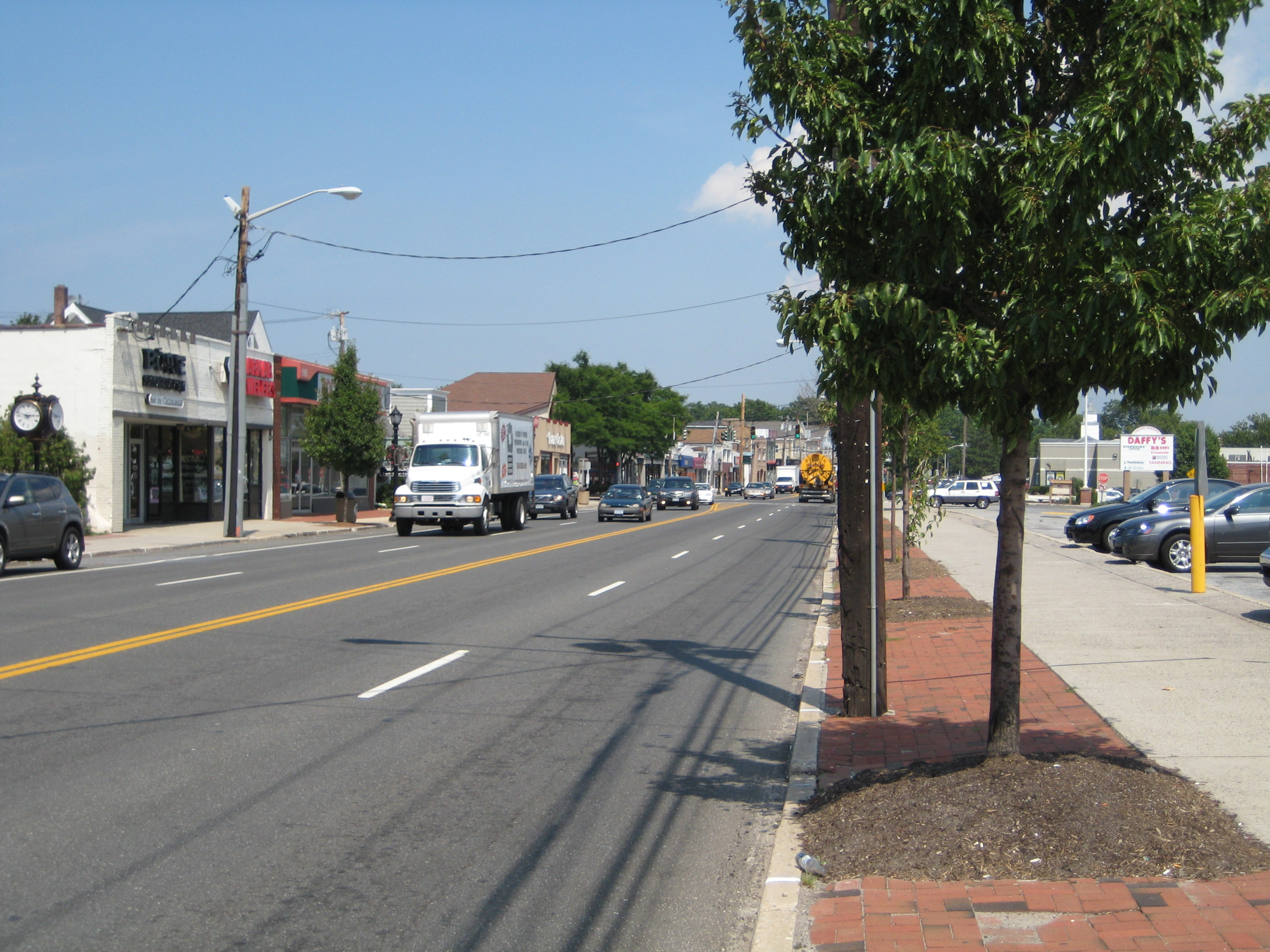
Main Street, Smithtown

- I-495 is the Long Island Expressway, and the sole interstate highway in the Town of Smithtown although only in the southwest corner of the town between Exit 52 in Commack and east of Exit 53 in Brentwood.
- Northern State Parkway was the sole west–east limited-access highway in the Town of Smithtown until the construction of the Long Island Expressway. It has interchanges from Exit 43 in Commack on the Huntington-Smithtown town Line to Veterans Memorial Highway in Hauppauge. Extensions further east were proposed at one time.
- Sagtikos State Parkway is the south–north parkway that enters the Town of Smithtown from Brentwood at the interchange with the Long Island Expressway, and terminates at the Northern State Parkway (Exit SM1) in Commack, where it becomes the Sunken Meadow State Parkway.
- Sunken Meadow State Parkway is the dominant south–north parkway within the western town of Smithtown. It begins at the Northern State Parkway as a continuation of Sagtikos State Parkway in Commack, winding northeast, until it reaches the Sunken Meadow State Park.
- NY 25 runs west to east along Jericho Turnpike from Suffolk CR 4 at the Huntington-Smithtown town Line through Main Street at the Smithtown Bull where it overlaps with NY 25A until separating with that route again at NY 111 in the Village of the Branch. East of there it runs along Main Street, then Middle Country Road through the Smithtown-Brookhaven town Line in the Village of Lake Grove.
- NY 25A is an alternate route of NY 25 that is the northernmost west–to-east state highway on Long Island including the town of Smithtown. It enters the town from Bread and Cheese Hollow Road in Fort Salonga, winding through the hills of Fort Salonga through Kings Park where it becomes Main Street, then makes a sharp turn to the south onto Saint Johnland Road before passing the Smithtown Bull where it overlaps with NY 25 and becomes Main Street. In the Village of the Branch, NY 25A leaves the overlap across from NY 111 where it runs along North Country Road as it heads northeast through St. James and Head of the Harbor before crossing the Smithtown-Brookhaven town Line west of Stony Brook.
- CR 16, includes Terry Road from the eastern border of the Village of the Branch to northeastern Hauppauge, and Smithtown Boulevard from northeastern Hauppauge through Nesconset to the northern shores of Lake Ronkonkoma.
- CR 93 is a four-lane south-north highway running from the northwestern edge of Sayville to the south and west side of Lake Ronkonkoma. The route enters the town from the Town of Islip and ends at CR 16 in Ronkonkoma.
- NY 111 is the main south-to-north state highway in the Town of Smithtown. It enters the town on Town Line Road in Hauppauge, then continues to the northeast where it passes by NY 347 and finally ends in the Village of the Branch at the east end of the overlap of NY 25 and 25A.
- NY 347 is a west-east divided highway known as the Smithtown Bypass, which runs southwest to northeast from Hauppauge to NY 25A west of Mount Sinai. The road was originally intended to become an expressway, but was repeatedly hampered by rampant development, and anti-highway activism.
- NY 454 is a west-east divided highway known as the Veterans' Memorial Highway, which runs northwest to southeast from Commack to NY 27 west of Suffolk CR 97 in Holbrook. Within the town it runs from NY 347 at the Islip-Smithtown Town Line and serves as the location for the Suffolk County Medical Examiner and Department of Consumer Affairs.

== Education ==
Smithtown Central School District is home of seven elementary schools, three middle schools, and two high schools.

The Town of Smithtown is also home to the Kings Park Central School District, a portion of the Commack Union Free School District (shared with the Town of Huntington), a portion of the Hauppauge Union Free School District (shared with the Town of Islip), a portion of the Sachem Central School District (shared with the Town of Brookhaven), as well as a portion of the Three Village Central School District (shared with the Town of Brookhaven)

=== Elementary schools ===
- Accompsett Elementary School
- Branch Brook Elementary School (Closed)
- Dogwood Elementary School
- Mills Pond Elementary School
- Mt. Pleasant Elementary School
- Nesconset Elementary School (Closed)
- Smithtown Elementary School
- St. James Elementary School
- Tackan Elementary School

=== Middle schools ===
- Accompsett Middle School (formerly Smithtown High School Freshman Campus 1992–2005)
- Great Hollow Middle School
- Nesaquake Middle school

=== Smithtown High School ===
- Eastern Campus (formerly Smithtown Central High School, 1960s–1973; formerly Smithtown High School East, 1973–1992; formerly Smithtown Middle School, 1992–2005) - located in St. James
  - The High School's Eastern Campus is composed of graduates of Nesaquake Middle School and those graduates of Great Hollow Middle School that reside in the Tackan and Mills Pond Elementary area.

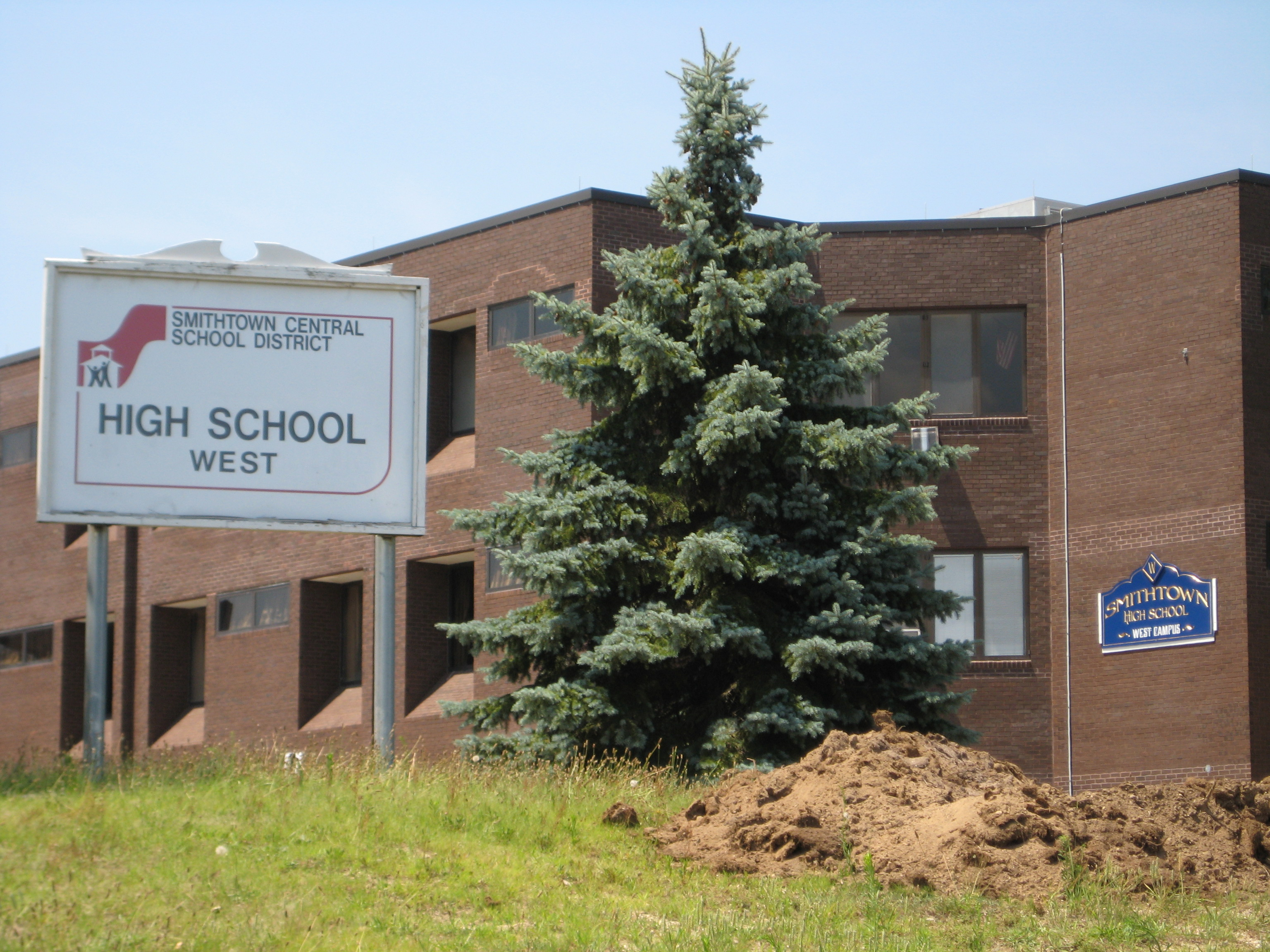
Smithtown High School West

- Western Campus (formerly Smithtown High School West, 1973–1992; formerly Smithtown High School 10-12 Building, 1992–2005) - located in south of the Kings Park Hamlet and west of the Smithtown Bull
  - The High School's Western Campus is composed of graduates of Accompsett Middle School and those graduates of Great Hollow Middle School that reside in the Mt. Pleasant Elementary area.

=== Private schools ===
- Smithtown Christian School (pre-school to twelfth grade)
- St. Patrick School

=== Former schools (No longer used as K-12 Facilities) ===
- New York Avenue Junior High School- (now the Joseph M. Barton/New York Avenue Building) Currently the central office and headquarters of Smithtown Central School District
- Smithtown Branch High School- Smithtown High School before the opening of Smithtown Central High School in the 1960s

== Notable people ==
- Mose Allison, American jazz and blues pianist, singer and songwriter
- Cooper Andrews, actor
- Craig Biggio, former Major League baseball player
- Frank Catalanotto, former Major League baseball player
- Adam Conover, American comedian, actor, and writer
- Dan Corbett, weather broadcaster for the BBC
- Bob Costas, American sportscaster
- John Curtis, American baseball player
- Amanda Daflos, American political figure
- John Daly, Olympic athlete
- David DiVona, musician and television personality
- Michael J. Epstein, filmmaker, musician, artist, and writer
- Nick Fanti, professional baseball player
- Brian Fitzpatrick, professional baseball player
- Mick Foley, former pro wrestler and author
- Eliot Glazer, comedian and actor
- Ilana Glazer, actress and comedian (Broad City)
- Andrew Gross, noted author
- John Hampson, Nine Days lead vocalist
- Emily Hart, American actress (younger sister of Melissa Joan Hart)
- Melissa Joan Hart, American actress (elder sister of Emily Hart)
- Jodi Hauptman, Senior Curator at The Museum of Modern Art, New York; organizer of landmark exhibitions Henri Matisse: The Cut-Outs and Georges Seurat - The Drawings
- Andrew Hauptman, businessman and owner of the Chicago Fire Soccer Club
- Eddie Hayes, celebrated attorney, bon vivant, and memoirist
- Chris Higgins, National Hockey League player
- Kevin Killian, poet, author, and playwright
- Keith Law, sportswriter and blogger
- Fredric Lebow, screenwriter
- Curtis Lepore, Internet personality
- Andrew Levy, publicist and co-host of Fox News' Red Eye
- Lori Loughlin, actress
- Brendan Martin, distance runner
- Lynn Martin, 68th president of the New York Stock Exchange
- Jim Mecir, Major League baseball player
- John Miceli, drummer for Meat Loaf
- Michael P. Murphy, Medal of Honor recipient, KIA in Operation Red Wings
- Soledad O'Brien, Chairwoman of Starfish Media Group; former CNN News anchor
- Kyle Palmieri, National Hockey League player
- Cubby Broccoli, Producer James Bond series of films
- John Petrucci, Dream Theater guitarist
- Jodi Picoult, novelist
- Stephen Rannazzisi, American actor
- Jai Rodriguez, Queer Eye and Broadway actor
- Scott Snyder, comic book writer and author
- Kevin Thoms, American actor
- Jeremy Wall, founding pianist of the jazz fusion band Spyro Gyra
- William Weld, 68th Governor of Massachusetts (1991–1997)
- William H. Wickham, 81st Mayor of New York City
- Matt Yallof, SNY sports broadcaster

== See also ==
- National Register of Historic Places listings in Smithtown (town), New York
