= Smithtown =

Smithtown may refer to:

- Smithtown, New York, a town in Suffolk County
  - Smithtown (CDP), New York, a hamlet and census-designated place (CDP) within the above town
  - Smithtown (LIRR station), a railroad station in the above town
  - Smithtown Christian School, a private school in the above town
- Smithtown, North Carolina, an unincorporated community in northern Yadkin County
- Smithtown, West Virginia, an unincorporated community in Monongalia County
- Smithtown, New South Wales, a town in Australia
