= Live (Blood, Sweat & Tears album) =

Live album by Blood, Sweat & Tears
- Released: 1994
- Recorded: October 12, 1980
- Genre: Rock, Jazz
- Label: Avenue
- Producer: Jerry Goldstein

Blood, Sweat & Tears chronology
Live and Improvised (1991)	Live (1994)

Live is a live album by the band Blood, Sweat & Tears, that was recorded in 1980 and released in 1994 by Avenue Records through Rhino Records. This album was recorded at the Street Scene in Downtown Los Angeles on October 12, 1980. This set was recorded five years after the In Concert/Live And Improvised album. The band's hit songs included in this collection were compressed into a 15-minute medley instead of the full-length versions that were included on their previous live album. The rest of the songs here are from the Nuclear Blues album they were touring to support at the time of this recording. One exception was an 11 1/2-minute version of "Gimme That Wine" that was originally released on the Brand New Day album in 1977.

== Track listing ==
1. "Intro" – :25
2. "Agitato" (Bruce Cassidy) – 6:19
3. "Nuclear Blues" (David Clayton-Thomas) – 4:08
4. "Manic Depression" (Jimi Hendrix) – 4:45
5. Medley:
  1. "God Bless the Child" (Arthur Herzog, Billie Holiday) – 2:57
  2. "Lucretia Mac Evil" (David Clayton-Thomas) – 1:12
  3. "Hi-De-Ho" (Gerry Goffin, Carole King) – 5:33
  4. "And When I Die" (Laura Nyro) – 1:36
  5. "Spinning Wheel" (David Clayton-Thomas) – 1:12
  6. "You've Made Me So Very Happy" (Berry Gordy Jr., Brenda Holloway, Frank Wilson, Patrice Holloway) – 2:35
6. (Suite) Spanish Wine
  1. "Introduction La Cantina" (Rob Piltch) – 2:31
  2. "(Theme) Spanish Wine" (Bruce Cassidy) – 1:03
  3. "Latin Fire" (Bruce Cassidy, Dave Piltch, Vern Dorge, Bobby Economou, Richard Martinez, Earl Seymour) – 3:32
  4. "(Theme) Spanish Wine" (Bruce Cassidy) – 0:15
  5. "The Duel" (Bruce Cassidy, Dave Piltch, Vern Dorge, Bobby Economou, Richard Martinez, Earl Seymour) – 0:20
  6. "The Challenge" (Bruce Cassidy, Dave Piltch, Vern Dorge, Bobby Economou, Richard Martinez, Earl Seymour) – 0:50
  7. "Amor" (Bruce Cassidy, Dave Piltch, Vern Dorge, Bobby Economou, Richard Martinez, Earl Seymour) – 1:24
  8. "(Theme) Spanish Wine" (Bruce Cassidy) – 1:04
7. "I'll Drown In My Own Tears" (Henry Glover) – 10:18
8. "Gimme That Wine" (Jon Hendricks) – 11:30
9. "Trouble in Mind/Shake a Hand" (Richard M. Jones) / (Joe Morris) – 6:38

== Personnel ==
- David Clayton-Thomas – Lead vocals
- Bobby Economou – Drums
- Lou Pomanti – Keyboards
- Peter Harris – Guitar
- Wayne Pedziwiatr – Bass
- Bruce Cassidy – Trumpet
- Vern Dorge – Saxophone, Flute, Clarinet
- Earl Seymour – Baritone & Tenor Saxophone

The personnel listed on the actual album of this are incorrect. The above is correct.

== Production notes ==
- Produced by Jerry Goldstein for Avenue Records
- Recording Engineer – Ed Barton
- Mixing Engineer – Kevin Beamish
- Mixed by Kevin Beamish and Frank Rand
- Mixed at Crystal Recording
- Mastered by Dave Collins at A&M Mastering
- Recorded at the Street Scene in Downtown Los Angeles on October 12, 1980
