= Kidnapping of Katie Beers =

New York kidnapping case

Katie Beers Case
- Location: Bay Shore, New York
- Date: December 28, 1992 – January 13, 1993
- Attack type: Kidnapping, false imprisonment, rape
- Victim: Katie Beers
- Perpetrator: John Esposito

Katherine Beers (born December 30, 1982) is an American woman who was kidnapped when she was 9 years old in Bay Shore, New York by family friend John Esposito, and held in an underground bunker for 16 days, from December 28, 1992, to January 13, 1993.

== Background ==
Katie Beers lived with her mother Marilyn Beers and older half-brother John Beers on Long Island, New York. Her biological father has never been identified. From a young age, Katie also lived with her godmother Linda Inghilleri and Inghilleri's husband, Salvatore. Marilyn has been reported as having frequently neglected Katie and John, leaving them in the care of the Inghilleris, from whom they endured abuse including frequent sexual assaults by Salvatore.

John Esposito was a friend of the Beers family who frequently gave attention and gifts to Katie and John Beers, but also sexually abused John. Esposito was previously arrested in 1977 for the attempted abduction of a twelve-year-old boy.

== Kidnapping ==
Esposito lured Beers into his house at 1416 Saxon Avenue Bay Shore, New York on December 28, 1992, two days before her tenth birthday, with a promise of birthday presents. After Beers played a video game in Esposito's bedroom, he forced her into an underground concrete bunker.

The 6-foot-by-7-foot bunker was located under Esposito's garden and accessed via a six-foot long tunnel concealed by a 200-pound concrete trap door and hidden behind a removable bookcase in Esposito's office. The bunker contained a commode toilet and closed-circuit television system. The bunker contained a coffin-size soundproofed room containing a bed and television where Beers was chained. Esposito later told police he built the bunker specifically for Beers. Beers later recalled playing in the dirt displaced by the bunker as Esposito dug it a few years before the kidnapping.

Immediately after forcing Beers into the bunker, Esposito made her record a message where she claimed a man with a knife had taken her. Esposito played the message at a pay phone outside the Spaceplex amusement arcade at Nesconset, New York and told arcade staff that he lost Beers in the building. Police were called when she could not be located.

During her captivity, Esposito frequently visited Beers to sexually abuse her while also providing food, blankets and toys. He allowed Beers into the larger part of the bunker when visiting but forced her back into the smaller room when she was alone. Although Beers could unchain herself and escape to the larger room in Esposito's absence after hiding a key under her pillow, she could not escape the bunker itself. Esposito told Beers he intended to keep her in the bunker for the remainder of her life, and planned to take a photo of her asleep and send it to police so they would believe she was dead, although the photo was never taken.

Esposito was a suspect from an early stage in the police investigation, following accusations of previous sexual abuse towards John Beers and witnesses at Spaceplex stating he entered the arcade alone on the day of Beers' disappearance. Police also determined that Beers' phone message about a man with a knife was from a previously made recording based on a lack of background noise.

On January 13, 1993, 17 days after the kidnapping, Esposito confessed to holding Beers captive and took police to the bunker where they rescued her.

== Aftermath ==
Esposito pleaded guilty to kidnapping on June 16, 1994, and was sentenced on July 27, 1994, to 15 years to life, a sentence he served at Sing Sing prison in Westchester County, New York. During Esposito's trial, Beers said he raped her during her captivity. Although he was not charged with this, the judge sentencing him agreed with her. Esposito was found dead in his cell of apparently natural causes on September 4, 2013, shortly after his fourth parole hearing in 20 years.

Salvatore Inghilleri was convicted of two counts of sexual abuse and served 12 years for molesting Beers. During the investigation into the kidnapping, authorities discovered that Inghilleri sexually abused the girl before she was abducted. He was prosecuted additionally for those crimes. He died in prison in 2009.

Shortly after her rescue, Beers was sent to live with foster parents in East Hampton, New York, due to the neglect and abuse the two children experienced before the kidnapping. Beers was given anonymity and raised by her foster parents until adulthood. In January 2013, Beers spoke publicly for the first time about her ordeal and revealed that she was married with two children and working in insurance. During the same month, she published a memoir about her ordeal.

== Media ==
In the months following the kidnapping, two books covering the case were published: My Name Is Katherine: The True Story of Little Katie Beers written by Maria Eftimiades and Joe Treen, and 17 Days: The Katie Beers Story by Arthur Herzog.

Beers' memoir, Buried Memories (known as Help Me in the United Kingdom) was co-written by reporter Carolyn Gusoff, who had covered Beers' case as it was happening, and was published on January 13, 2013, on the 20th anniversary of her rescue.

ABC's 20/20 episode "Saved" covered the Katie Beers story in February 2013.

Investigation Discovery recounted the case on an episode of its 2020 documentary miniseries Killer Carnies. It included accounts from Beers, the lead police detective, and others.

== See also ==
- List of kidnappings
- List of solved missing person cases: 1950–1999
