= Orca (1977 film) =

1977 thriller film by Michael Anderson

Orca: The Killer Whale
- Theatrical release poster by John Berkey
- Directed by: Michael Anderson
- Written by: Luciano Vincenzoni; Sergio Donati
- Based on: Orca by Arthur Herzog
- Produced by: Luciano Vincenzoni
- Starring: Richard Harris; Charlotte Rampling; Will Sampson; Bo Derek
- Cinematography: Ted Moore
- Edited by: John Bloom; Marion Rothman; Ralph E. Winters
- Music by: Ennio Morricone
- Production company: Famous Films Productions
- Distributed by: Paramount Pictures
- Release date: July 22, 1977
- Running time: 92 minutes
- Countries: United States; United Kingdom; Italy
- Languages: English; Italian
- Budget: $6 million or $7.5 million
- Box office: $14.7 million

Orca (also known as Orca: The Killer Whale) is a 1977 thriller film directed by Michael Anderson, from a screenplay by Luciano Vincenzoni and Sergio Donati based on a novel by Arthur Herzog, and starring Richard Harris, Charlotte Rampling, Will Sampson, Bo Derek, Keenan Wynn and Robert Carradine. The film follows a male orca tracking down and getting revenge on a fishing boat and its captain for unintentionally killing the whale's pregnant mate and their unborn calf.

Executive producer Dino De Laurentiis commissioned the project to cash in on the blockbuster success of Jaws. Filming took place in Newfoundland and Labrador and Malta, with many of the orca scenes shot at the Marineland of the Pacific and the Marine World theme parks.

Upon release, the film was a minor box office success, but received mostly unfavorable reception from critics and audiences alike due to its similarities to Jaws, which released two years prior.

== Plot ==
Captain Nolan is an Irish Canadian fisherman living in Newfoundland who catches marine animals to pay the mortgage on his boat, "Bumpo", and eventually return to Ireland. Nolan's crew is looking for a great white shark for a local aquarium, but the shark targets the aquarium's representative, Ken. An orca intervenes and kills the shark, saving Ken's life.

Nolan switches targets to the much more valuable orca. He attempts to harpoon the creature but accidentally strikes a female orca instead. The pain causes the female orca to swim into the boat's propellers, fatally wounding her. Nolan and his crew get the orca on board, where she subsequently miscarries. The captain hoses the dead fetus overboard as the male orca, the female's mate, looks on and screams in anguish.

The enraged male tries to ram Bumpo. Nolan's first mate, Novak, cuts the dead female loose to distract their attacker, but the orca jumps the boat and takes him with it under the ocean. The following day, the orca pushes his dead mate onto the shore. Nolan agrees to kill the male, as the angry orca is causing the fish vital to the village's economy to migrate. The orca continues his vengeance by sinking several fishing boats and rupturing underwater oil pipes, depriving the villagers of fuel.

Rachel Bedford, a colleague of Ken and an experienced cetologist, shows Nolan how similar orcas are to humans. He confesses that he empathizes with the orca, as his own wife and unborn child were killed in a car crash caused by a drunk driver. Nolan promises Bedford that he will not fight the orca, but that night the whale attacks his home, resulting in crewmember Annie losing her left leg. After seeing her in the hospital, Nolan recruits his only other remaining crewman, Paul, along with Ken, Bedford, and Jacob Umilak, a Mi'kmaq hunter, to pursue the orca.

The crew chases the orca after it signals Nolan to follow. Following an unsuccessful attempt to kill the orca with dynamite, Ken is leaning over the side when the orca surfaces and grabs him, killing him. They follow the orca to the Strait of Belle Isle, but when Paul loses his nerve and tries to flee in the lifeboat, the orca smashes it, and he drowns. The next day, the orca maneuvers Nolan to collide with an iceberg. The captain harpoons the whale just as he and Bedford escape from the sinking Bumpo, but Umilak is crushed beneath an avalanche of ice after sending an SOS.

Nolan and Bedford hide on an iceberg, but Nolan slips onto another one, separating them and potentially saving her life. The orca jumps onto the ice, causing it to tilt and sending Nolan into the water, then catches him with its tail and hurls him to his death against the ice. A helicopter arrives to rescue Bedford. Meanwhile, the orca dives below the ice as the credits roll.

== Cast ==
- Richard Harris as Captain Nolan
- Charlotte Rampling as Rachel Bedford
- Will Sampson as Jacob Umilak
- Bo Derek as Annie
- Keenan Wynn as Gus Novak
- Robert Carradine as Ken
- Peter Hooten as Paul
- Scott Walker as Al Swain
- Wayne Heffley as Priest
- Don "Red" Barry as Dockworker

== Production ==
=== Writing ===
Writer-producer Luciano Vincenzoni was first assigned to give the film a head start after being called by Dino de Laurentiis in the middle of the night in 1975. Upon admitting that he had watched the film Jaws, Vincenzoni was instructed by de Laurentiis to "find a fish tougher and more terrible than the great white". Having had little interest in sea life beforehand, Vincenzoni was directed to killer whales by his brother Adriano, who had a personal interest in zoology. This was Vincenzoni's only film as a producer, as he was mainly a screenwriter.

Because neither Vincenzoni nor his co-writer Sergio Donati were native English speakers, Robert Towne was hired as an uncredited script doctor to touch up dialogue.

=== Filming ===
Filming took place from June 14, 1976, to October 1976. Location filming took place in the town of Petty Harbour, about 20 kilometres south of St. John's. The scenery meant to represent the Strait of Belle Isle was fabricated in Malta by designer Mario Garbuglia. The underwater photography was supervised by J. Barry Herron, credited with "special photography contributions."

According to Vincenzoni, Will Sampson was frequently drunk on set and was verbally threatening to him, prompting Vincenzoni to placate Sampson by promising that he would have written a film solely for him. Richard Harris had also begun to drink heavily on set after reading a tabloid magazine and seeing a photograph of his wife Ann Turkel on a beach with a younger man. He reportedly intended to stop performing and fly to Malibu in order to kill them, relenting only after getting into a brawl which resulted in Vincenzoni getting a black eye. The 46-year-old Harris insisted on performing his own stunts in the polar sequences and was nearly killed on several occasions.

=== Orcas ===
The main orcas used for filming, called Yaka and Nepo, were trained animals from Marineland of the Pacific and Marine World/Africa USA, though model whales made of rubber were also used. These models were so lifelike that several animal rights activists blocked the trucks transporting them, confusing them for real orcas. The shark used early in the film was captured by noted shark hunter Ron Taylor.

== Home media ==
In 2004, Paramount Home Entertainment released Orca on Region A DVD. In 2017, Umbrella Entertainment released Orca on Region B Blu-ray with a new 4-minute interview with Martha De Laurentiis. On June 30, 2020, Scream Factory released Orca on Region A Blu-ray with an improved video transfer. StudioCanal released Orca on 4K UHD in Sept 2024 featuring a brand new remaster. StudioCanal released Orca on Blu-ray with a Brand New Restoration & 4 Artcards on September 15, 2024, in the UK.

== Reception ==
The film grossed $3.5 million from 775 theatres in its opening weekend and went on to gross $14,717,854 in the United States and Canada.

On the review aggregator website Rotten Tomatoes, the film holds an approval rating of 10% based on 39 reviews and an average rating of 3.7/10. The site's critical consensus reads: "Content to regurgitate bits of better horror movies, Orca: The Killer Whale is a soggy shark thriller with frustratingly little bite." A contemporary review published by Variety called the film "man-vs-beast nonsense", and lamented that "fine special effects and underwater camera work are plowed under in dumb story-telling." Richard Schickel of Time wrote that the filmmakers behind Orca "thumbed heavily through the literature of the sea in their search for dramatic cliches", and called the film "inept" and "suspenselessly shot". Gary Arnold of The Washington Post criticized the film's special effects and referred to it as "essentially a rehash of an earlier De Laurentiis hit, Death Wish, with the killer whale in Charles Bronson role."

Orca has been unfavorably compared to Jaws. Both Schickel and Arnold drew comparisons between the films, and Bob Thomas of the Associated Press called it "just another attempt to copy Jaws". Dave Kehr of the Chicago Reader called the film an "incoherent blend of Moby-Dick, King Kong, and Jaws, hindered by what appears to be extensive reediting". However, Richard Harris enjoyed his experiences during filming and took offence at comparisons between Orca and Jaws.

== See also ==
- List of American films of 1977
- List of natural horror films
- Namu, the Killer Whale, a 1966 movie about an orca who was studied by a marine biologist in a small fishing village after the death of its mate in an effort to understand it
- The Day of the Dolphin

== Works cited ==
- Freitag, Gina; Loiselle, André, eds. (2015). The Canadian Horror Film: Terror of the Soul. University of Toronto Press. ISBN 978-1-4426-2850-2.
- Vincenzoni, Luciano (2005). Pane e cinema: il racconto di una vita straordinaria consacrata al mondo del cinema (in Italian). Gremese Editore. ISBN 978-8884403919.
