= New York State Route 347 =

Highway on Long Island, New York

New York State Route 347
- Nesconset–Port Jefferson Highway
- Map of Suffolk County on Long Island with NY 347 highlighted in red

Route information
- Maintained by NYSDOT
- Length: 14.48 mi (23.30 km)
- Existed: 1966–present

Major junctions
- West end: NY 454 / Northern State Parkway in Hauppauge
- NY 454 in Hauppauge; NY 111 in Hauppauge; NY 25 at the Nesconset–St. James line CR 97 in Lake Grove; NY 112 at the Terryville–Port Jefferson Station line
- East end: NY 25A in Mount Sinai

Location
- Country: United States
- State: New York
- Counties: Suffolk

Highway system
- New York Highways; Interstate; US; State; Reference; Parkways
← NY 346	→ NY 348

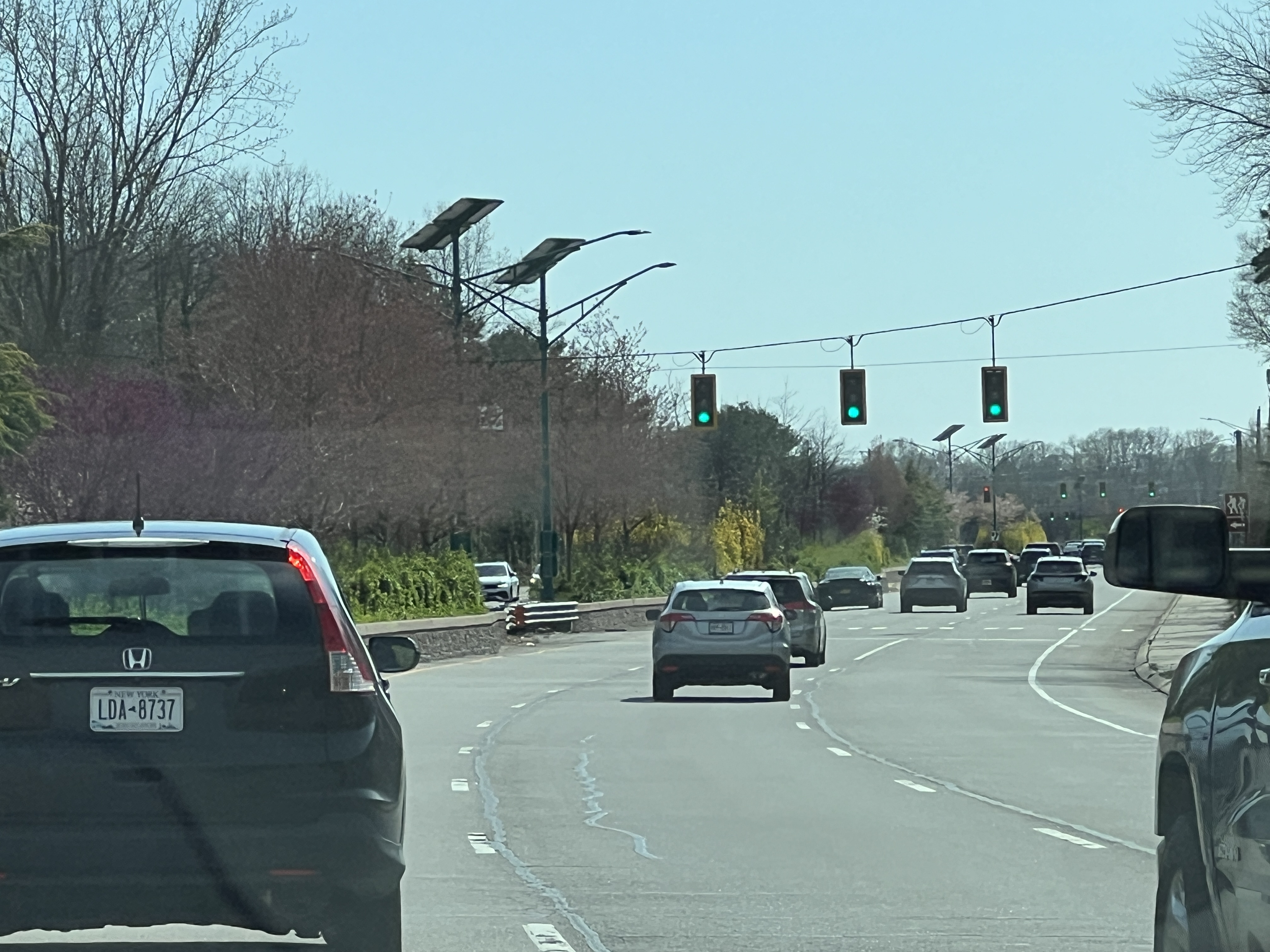
Westbound NY 347 in Smithtown in 2024.

New York State Route 347 (NY 347) is an east–west state highway located in Suffolk County, New York, in the United States. It connects the Northern State Parkway in Hauppauge to NY 25A in Mount Sinai. The route serves as a southern bypass of Smithtown and as a direct link between Nesconset and Port Jefferson, leading to the road being known as Smithtown Bypass in the Town of Smithtown, and for its entire length as the Nesconset–Port Jefferson Highway. Along the way, NY 347 intersects NY 25 in Nesconset and Nicolls Road (County Route 97 or CR 97) in Lake Grove. The westernmost 2 miles (3.2 km) of NY 347 is concurrent with NY 454 while the portion northeast of NY 25 parallels NY 25A, which follows a more northerly alignment through the Town of Brookhaven than NY 347.

The highway was built by Suffolk County in the 1950s and designated as part of two county routes. It gained a single designation in 1966 when the state of New York assumed ownership and maintenance of the highway and designated it as NY 347. Several proposals to extend or improve the highway have been developed in the years since; however, none have been implemented, mostly due to community opposition.

== Route description ==
NY 347 begins at an interchange with NY 454 and the Northern State Parkway in Hauppauge; this interchange also serves as the eastern terminus of the Northern State Parkway. Proceeding eastbound, NY 347 and NY 454 are immediately concurrent on Veterans Highway, crossing as a six-lane arterial road through the town of Smithtown, passing south of Blydenburgh County Park. Forestwood Park soon begins nearby, while the two routes continue eastward before the two routes fork at an interchange in Smithtown. NY 347 bends to the northeast on Smithtown Bypass, intersecting with County Route 76 (CR 76; Townline Road). The route proceeds northeastward as a four-lane commercial arterial, crossing an at-grade interchange with NY 111 (Hauppauge Road).

NY 347 continues northeast as Smithtown Bypass, entering the Nesconset section of Smithtown. In Nesconset, NY 347 becomes a four-lane wooded arterial before passing east of Village of the Branch, where homes surrounded the highway from connecting roads. The route becomes commercial once again, NY 347 intersecting with CR 16 (Terry Road). The route bends to the east, crossing through Nesconset, then to the northeast and enters an at-grade interchange with NY 25 (Middle Country Road). Crossing into the Saint James section of Smithtown, NY 347 continues to the northeast as the four-lane commercial arterial, now known as Nesconset Highway. NY 347 soon leaves Smithtown for Lake Grove, where it expands to six lanes, crossing a short time into Brookhaven before re-entering Lake Grove. In the second entrance of Lake Grove, NY 347 intersects with CR 97 (Nicolls Road), which continues south as an eight-lane limited-access highway.

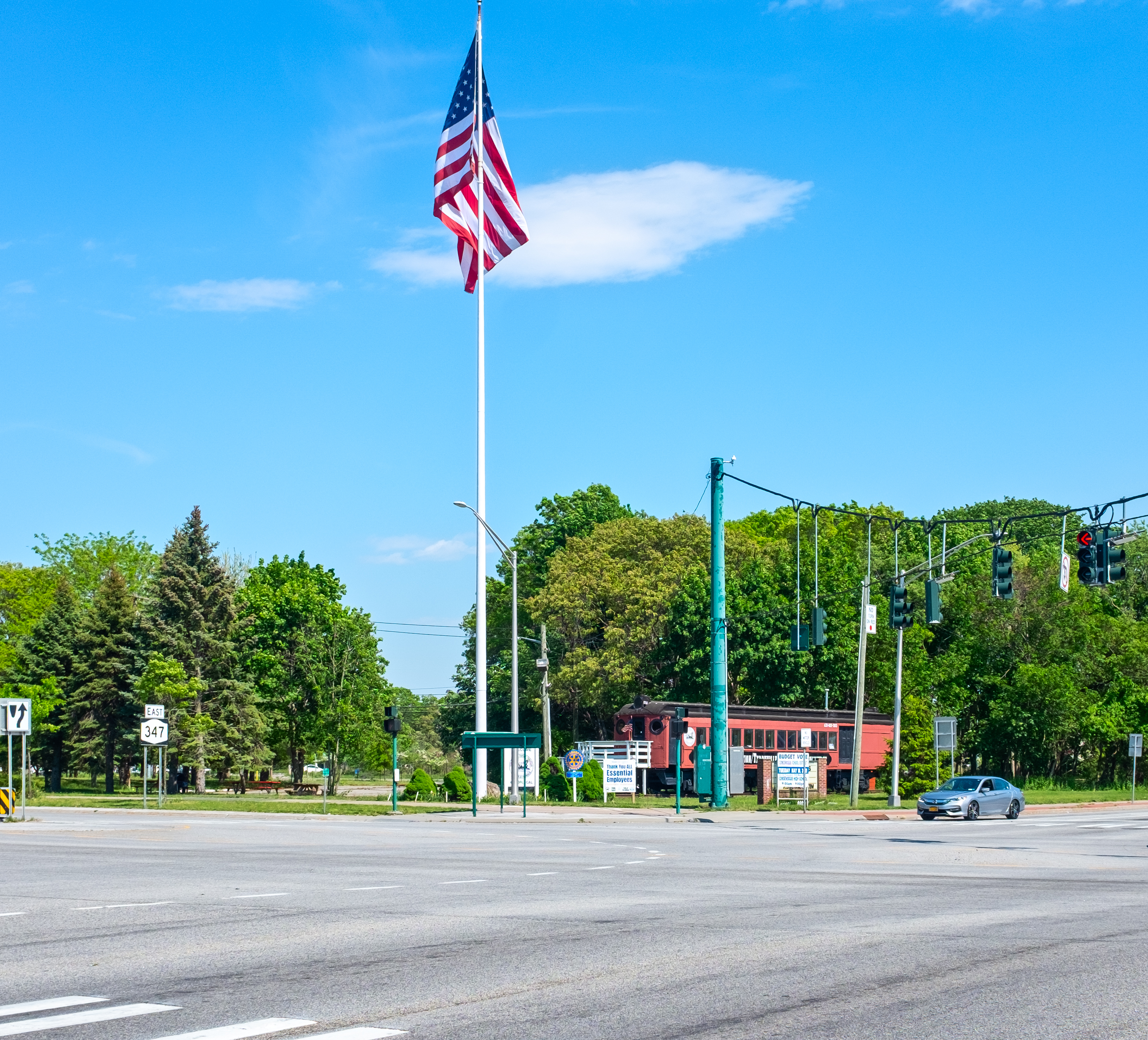
Intersection of NY 347 and 112

NY 347 continues to the northeast into the Town of Brookhaven once again, passing north of Percy B. Raynor Memorial Park. Crossing power lines, the route enters the hamlet of Terryville, and soon into Port Jefferson Station, where it intersects with NY 112 (Patchogue Road). After passing near the yard for the Port Jefferson Branch of the Long Island Rail Road before merging into the right-of-way with NY 25A (Hallock Avenue) in Mount Sinai.

== History ==
=== Construction and designation ===
What is now NY 347 was originally built by Suffolk County in the 1950s as two separate highways, along a former dairy farmer delivery route. Southwest of NY 25, it was known as Smithtown Bypass and designated as CR 85. Northeast of NY 25, it was named the Nesconset–Port Jefferson Highway and designated as CR 80. Although the road acts as an eastward extension of the Northern State Parkway (with a 2-mile or 3.2-kilometre section of Veterans Memorial Highway, now NY 454, connecting the two), Robert Moses planned an altogether different right-of-way for an extension of the Northern State. In fact, the Parkway was planned to have an interchange with Smithtown Bypass west of CR 16 (Terry Road).

In 1966, the state of New York acquired both CR 80 and CR 85 and designated the new, unified route as NY 347. Suffolk County hoped that by transferring jurisdiction to the state, it would be easier to upgrade the road into the limited-access highway as was originally intended. The CR 80 and CR 85 designations were later reused for portions of Montauk Highway, then part of NY 27A, that were transferred from the state to the county. CR 80 was reassigned to the portion of Montauk Highway between Patchogue and Hampton Bays on October 6, 1966, while CR 85 was given to the section between Oakdale and Patchogue on March 29, 1972.

In 1973, NYSDOT tried once again to transform NY 347 into a freeway; the proposal also included the widening of NY 25 west of NY 347 and the addition of frontage roads along NY 25. This, too, was cancelled by community opposition – as were subsequent, revived plans to upgrade the road between 1987 and 1988. In 1991, after an extensive study considering numerous alternative plans for rebuilding Nesconset Highway, NYSDOT selected "Alternative 12a" as its preferred option. This option retained the limited-access features of a freeway while limiting the use of frontage roads to those areas which truly needed them. The footprint of this option was kept to a minimum through the use of single-point urban interchanges rather than complex and expansive cloverleaf-type interchanges. Plans for building this option were ultimately shelved.

Ten years later, in 2001, NYSDOT announced a new proposal for a community friendly alternative. This alternative retained only three interchanges, retained most other grade crossings, and widened the highway to three lanes in each direction. Notably, few residential homes and a handful of business were targeted for public taking in this variation from Alternative 12a. Nonetheless, many civic associations opposed the new plan. The Tri-State Transportation Campaign, Affiliated Brookhaven Civics Organizations (ABCO), and others opposed the proposed improvements. Other organizations, like the Long Island Association, derided NYSDOT's decision to not make NY 347 a limited access highway after nearly 35 years of planning to make it so. That same year local civic organization called the Committee for a New 347 was formed, advocating turning NY 347 into the "Nesconset Greenway", a six-lane highway with the functionality of a limited-access highway and the aesthetic designs of a Long Island parkway. Design elements included stone arch and stone-faced overpasses, earthen berms as soundwall protection, and separate, dedicated space for a bike path.

==== 21st century improvements ====
As of the mid-2010s and early 2020s, a project to upgrade the highway is underway. The project, known as the NY Route 347 Safety, Mobility and Environmental Improvements Project, is to improve traffic flow and transform NY 347 into a multi-modal highway. Soundwalls, earthen berms, a third lane, new curbs & gutters, and landscaped medians – along with bicycle & pedestrian paths, green spaces, bus shelters, and green infrastructure – are all being constructed as part of the project. Two interchanges will be constructed, as well: one at NY 25 and the other at Nicolls Road – and many remaining at-grade intersections will be enhanced.

By 2018, the project was temporarily paused due to budget shortfalls, after a third of the project was constructed, putting the plans for upgrading the remaining two thirds of the project on hold. Residents and businesses petitioned the state and county governments to complete the refurbishment for the entire run of the highway. Further improvements were halted in 2018 until adequate funding was found to continue the future phases. Then-Suffolk County Executive Steve Bellone issued a call to the state government to adequately fund the continued improvements to complete the project in Feb 2018: "You know when you talk about shovel ready projects, this project is as shovel ready as you can get. It is as Marc said, it has been planned, designed, four miles of it has been constructed. It is ready to go. The workers are there, the men and women of labor who are working on this job are ready to go, the only thing that is lacking here is the will. It is the money, but it is not the money, it’s the will to get it done. We absolutely need this funding".

Construction on the project resumed in the 2020s. As of April 2024, the project is in the sixth phase, with construction anticipated to be completed by the end of the year.

=== Extension proposals ===
For six years, the western terminus of NY 347 was at the then-county-maintained Veterans Memorial Highway. The state acquired the Veterans Memorial Highway on March 29, 1972, placing both termini of NY 347 at state highways. Originally, the state of New York had planned on building a spur between the Long Island Expressway (Interstate 495) and Smithtown Bypass. The location of the terminus was intended to be between exits 55 and 56, although some maps have indicated that the terminus was to be at or just west of exit 55. The southern half of Simeon Woods Road (unsigned NY 901A) follows part of the spur's proposed path. The plan was cancelled in 1977, at which time the NY 347 designation was extended westward along NY 454 to the interchange with the Northern State Parkway.

Another extension was planned by the Suffolk County Department of Public Works in the early 1980s. The highway, known as the North Brookhaven Expressway and proposed as CR 26, would have begun west of Pipe–Stave Hollow Road and ended at the intersection of NY 25A and William Floyd Parkway (CR 46). This idea was never carried out due to community opposition. A very faint vestige lives on, however, in the Rocky Point Bypass section of NY 25A, which was constructed in the late 1990s.

=== Impact of sprawl ===
Soon after the state of New York assumed ownership of the roadway in 1966, plans were immediately developed to improve it to a limited-access highway flanked by service roads. The new plans required doubling the right-of-way of the roadway from the original 116-foot (35 m) width. When the Smith Haven Mall was built in 1969, it became a major retail attraction for those Long Islanders living east of Huntington. The success of the mall spurred further commercial and residential development along NY 347, effectively killing the proposed upgrade to the highway. The two townships through which the newly re-designated NY 347 traversed initially enforced setback requirements on new developments. For example, developers of the Billy Blake Department Store shopping center in Port Jefferson Station between Old Town Road and Arrowhead Lane built a service road to access that retail outlet. The Hess gas station and McDonald's restaurant in Stony Brook were built several hundred feet away from the roadway.

By the late 1980s, however, the town of Brookhaven allowed development along the artery if the developer received a letter from the New York State Department of Transportation (NYSDOT) indicating that such development would not interfere with any transportation improvements contemplated for completion within the next five years. Owing to meager highway construction budgets during the 1970s and 1980s and the lack of strong political support for widening NY 347, NYSDOT budgeted and spent its funds elsewhere. The combination of Brookhaven's policies and NYSDOT's budget woes lead to the construction of many buildings that would have had to have been razed in order to improve the highway. These new "facts on the ground" sowed the seeds of political opposition to making major improvements in later decades.

The parcels alongside most of NY 347 were strip zoned for commercial properties, allowing the rapid development to take place. Considered state of the art planning at the time it was implemented, today it is considered a poor practice that leads to suburban sprawl and blight. This combination of factors gave a green light to developers to encroach development on the roadway. One person who exemplified the development frenzy was John M. McNamara, a local automotive dealer and developer. McNamara, and many other politically connected developers, cluttered the road with new developments. The Billy Blake shopping center which had a service road in front of it, had fallen on hard times. McNamara took over the reconstruction of the shopping center in the late 1980s as part of an effort to revitalize it, dismantling of the service road in the process. His project failed, but eventually it was discovered that he was bribing various government officials in the town of Brookhaven, Suffolk County, village of Port Jefferson, and even NYSDOT. However, this revelation had no impact on either facilitating improvements to the highway or curbing development.

== Major intersections ==
The entire route is in Suffolk County.

Location	mi	km	Destinations	Notes
Hauppauge	0.00	0.00	NY 454 west – Commack	Continuation west; western end of NY 454 concurrency
Hauppauge	0.00	0.00	Northern State Parkway west – New York	Interchange; eastern terminus of Northern State Parkway; no westbound entrance
Hauppauge	2.19	3.52	NY 454 east – Patchogue	Eastern end of NY 454 concurrency; no westbound exit
Hauppauge	3.00	4.83	NY 111 – Smithtown, Islip	Access via jughandles signed as exits N–S
Nesconset–St. James line	6.91	11.12	NY 25 – Smithtown, Riverhead	No left turns
Lake Grove	9.16	14.74	CR 97 (Nicolls Road) – Stony Brook, Blue Point	
Terryville–Port Jefferson Station line	13.44	21.63	NY 112 (Patchogue Road) – Patchogue, Port Jefferson	Former roundabout
Mount Sinai	14.48	23.30	NY 25A east – Wading River, Riverhead	Eastern terminus
1.000 mi = 1.609 km; 1.000 km = 0.621 mi: Concurrency terminus; Incomplete access
