= Carolyn Gusoff =

American TV news reporter and author

- Born: Carolyn Sue Gusoff; New York City, U.S.
- Education: Cornell University (B.A.); Columbia University Graduate School of Journalism (M.A.)
- Occupations: Television news reporter, author
- Spouse: Jon Turk (m. 1991)
- Children: 2
- Awards: Emmy Award
- Website: www.carolyngusoff.com

Carolyn Gusoff is an American television news reporter and author, working as a Long Island reporter at WCBS-TV in New York City. Prior to that, she spent three years as a reporter at Fox 5 in New York City, and before that she worked for 15 years at WNBC in New York City as the Long Island Bureau Chief/Reporter and anchor of Weekend Today in New York. Her 2013 book Buried Memories: Katie Beers' Story, which she wrote in collaboration with kidnapping victim Katie Beers, was a New York Times bestseller.

== Career ==
Gusoff graduated from George W. Hewlett High School, Cornell University with a bachelor's degree in English and Government and the Columbia University Graduate School of Journalism, where she earned a master's degree in Journalism.

Gusoff started her career in Fort Myers, Florida, where she worked at WEVU-TV, an ABC affiliate at the time, and WLEQ-FM. In the late 1980s, Gusoff began working at News 12 Long Island. In August 1993, Gusoff joined WNBC, the NBC owned and operated station in New York City. Gusoff was the Long Island Correspondent and Bureau Chief. During her time on NBC 4, she covered the crash of TWA Flight 800, the crash of American Airlines Flight 587 and the Blizzard of 1996. Until fall 2008, Gusoff anchored Today in New York on Saturday and Sunday mornings on WNBC. On December 31, 2008, Gusoff was let go from WNBC amid station-wide downsizing. Gusoff joined WNYW Fox 5 in the Spring of 2009 and covered breaking news in the metropolitan area for Good Day New York. In January 2012, she was hired by WCBS-TV to cover the Long Island Beat. Her book Buried Memories was released in January 2013. A new edition, published by Beaufort Books of New York, was released in April 2015.

== Awards ==
Her honors include five New York Emmy Awards and twenty-five New York Emmy nominations. She won an Emmy and AP award for "Littered Landscape," an investigative report about litter uncollected on privately adopted highways. She was nominated for writing and research of 37%, a documentary about the poorly performing Hempstead School District. She was part of the winning team that earned WCBS an Emmy for its coverage of Superstorm Sandy. In 2004, she was awarded a New York Emmy Award for On-Camera Performance/General Assignment Reporting for the Mepham Hazing Scandal and earlier, for coverage of an Instant Breaking News Story. Gusoff's Emmy nominations honored her reporting of the American Airlines Flight 587 crash and the Belmont Stakes. She has garnered dozens of Long Island Fair Media Council FOLIO awards in categories ranging from "Best Reporter" (2026) "Best Feature" to "Best Blog", "Enterprise Reporting" and "Investigative Journalism", and multiple first-place Society of Professional Journalists/Press Club of Long Island awards. Carolyn has also been recognized by The American Women in Radio and Television, The Associated Press/New York Spot News Award, and United Press International/New York Broadcast Award.

== Personal life ==
In September 1991, Gusoff married facial cosmetic surgeon Dr. Jon Turk. They have two children.
