= The Swarm (1978 film) =

1978 US natural horror film by Irwin Allen

- Theatrical release poster by C. Winston Taylor
- Directed by: Irwin Allen
- Screenplay by: Stirling Silliphant
- Based on: The Swarm; 1974 novel by Arthur Herzog
- Produced by: Irwin Allen
- Starring: Michael Caine; Katharine Ross; Richard Widmark; Richard Chamberlain; Olivia de Havilland; Ben Johnson; Lee Grant; José Ferrer; Patty Duke Astin; Slim Pickens; Bradford Dillman; Fred MacMurray; Henry Fonda; Cameron Mitchell
- Cinematography: Fred J. Koenekamp
- Edited by: Harold F. Kress
- Music by: Jerry Goldsmith
- Distributed by: Warner Bros.
- Release date: July 14, 1978
- Running time: 116 minutes(1978 Theatrical Cut); 155 minutes (1992 Laserdisc Release)
- Country: United States
- Language: English
- Budget: $11.5 million or $21 million
- Box office: $7.7 million (US and Canada rentals)

The Swarm is a 1978 American natural horror film directed and produced by Irwin Allen and based on Arthur Herzog's 1974 novel of the same name. It stars an ensemble cast, including Michael Caine, Katharine Ross, Richard Widmark, Richard Chamberlain, Olivia de Havilland, Ben Johnson, Lee Grant, José Ferrer, Patty Duke, Slim Pickens, Bradford Dillman, Henry Fonda, Cameron Mitchell, and Fred MacMurray in his final film role. It follows a scientist and a military task force who try to prevent a large swarm of killer bees from invading Texas.

The film received overwhelmingly negative reviews from critics and was a box-office bomb. Despite Paul Zastupnevich being nominated for the Academy Award for Best Costume Design, it has since been considered one of the worst films ever made.

== Plot ==
In south Texas, an unknown force invades and neutralizes a top-security United States Air Force ICBM command bunker. An Air Force unit, led by Major Baker, investigates and finds an unauthorized scientist at the secured base, Dr. Bradford Crane, who was tracking a swarm of killer bees when they attacked the bunker. General Slater orders two helicopters to check the area, whereupon they are destroyed by the swarm. Crane insists to Slater that the base was attacked by the same African killer bees that destroyed the helicopters. Helena Anderson, one of the base's doctors, supports Crane's story.

In the nearby countryside, the swarm attacks the Durant family. The mother and father die from the bee stings, but their son Paul escapes in their car. Despite being stung, Paul makes it into town, crashing into Marysville town square, where the citizens prepare for the annual flower festival. The boy is brought before military personnel, where due to the aftereffects of the bee sting, he hallucinates a vision of giant bees attacking him.

Dr. Walter Krim confirms to Crane that the war against the bees they have feared for a long time has started. At the gates of the base, Slater confronts county engineer Jud Hawkins, who demands to see the corpse of his son, an airman in the bunker whom the bees killed. Hawkins takes the body bag and departs. Slater suggests airdropping poison on the swarm, but Crane considers the ecological possibilities of the situation, as the poison will wipe out plant growth for a decade or more.

Recovering from his earlier bee attack, Paul and his friends search for the hive to firebomb it and avenge his family. This only angers the bees, who invade Marysville and kill hundreds. Crane and Helena take shelter at the local diner with pregnant café waitress Rita Bard. Reporter Anne McGregor watches from the safety of her news van, hoping to get exciting footage about the siege. After this attack, and fear of another one, Slater suggests evacuating many of the townsfolk in a train. However, the bees attack the train, causing it to derail over a cliff and kill almost everyone aboard, including a love triangle made up of schoolteacher Maureen Scheuster, retiree Felix Austin and town mayor and drug store owner Clarence Tuttle.

Rita tries to board the ill-fated train but is saved at the last minute by going into labor and being confined to the hospital. She gives birth to her child while falling in love with the doctor in the process. Paul suffers a relapse from the effects of being stung earlier and eventually dies, devastating Helena and sending her into a rage about why the children have to die.

The swarm heads for Houston, Texas, and Crane decides to drop eco-friendly poison pellets on them, hoping the bees' senses will be harmed and they will stay away from the city. The plan, however, fails. Dr. Krim self-injects an experimental bee venom antidote, planning to track the results, but the trial proves fatal and he dies. Meanwhile, nuclear power plant manager Dr. Andrews is convinced that his plant can withstand the bees' attacks, ignoring the warnings of Dr. Hubbard. The bees nevertheless penetrate the plant, causing a nuclear explosion that annihilates Andrews, Hubbard, the plant and a nearby town.

Meanwhile, in Houston, Slater orders the city to be burned in the final hopes of defeating the swarm. Crane analyzes tapes from the bee invasion and concludes that a test of an alarm system at the ICBM bunker attracted the swarm into the base. The bees attack Houston, resulting in the deaths of Major Baker and Dr. Newman, one of Crane's associates. Slater sacrifices himself to save Crane and Helena from the bees. Helicopters playing the alarm sound from the ICBM bunker over loudspeakers lure the bees out to sea, where they douse the water with oil and set the swarm ablaze. Helena wonders if their victory was just temporary. Crane responds that he does not know, but decides that "if we use our time wisely, the world just might survive".

== Cast ==
- Michael Caine as Dr. Bradford Crane
- Katharine Ross as Captain (Dr.) Helena Anderson
- Richard Widmark as Major General Thaddeus Slater
- Richard Chamberlain as Dr. Hubbard
- Olivia de Havilland as Maureen Schuester
- Ben Johnson as Felix Austin
- Lee Grant as Anne MacGregor
- José Ferrer as Dr. Andrews
- Patty Duke Astin as Rita Bard
- Slim Pickens as Jud Hawkins
- Bradford Dillman as Major Baker
- Fred MacMurray as Mayor Clarence Tuttle
- Henry Fonda as Dr. Walter Krim
- Cameron Mitchell as General Thompson
- Christian Juttner as Paul Durant
- Doria Cook-Nelson as Mrs. Durant (credited as Doria Cook)
- Robert Varney as Mr. Durant
- Morgan Paull as Dr. Newman
- Alejandro Rey as Dr. Tomas Martinez
- Don "Red" Barry as Pete Harris
- Patrick Culliton as Sheriff Morrison
- Ernie F. Orsatti as Duty Sergeant
- Trent Dolan as Radio Sergeant

== Production ==
The film was announced in 1974 at the height of the disaster-movie craze. It was part of $38 million worth of projects Allen had lined up, including The Day the World Ended (a project which was retitled and released in 1980 as When Time Ran Out...). The script was written by Stirling Silliphant, who had written The Towering Inferno for Allen. He said in December 1974 that Allen hoped to start filming in April 1975. Production was delayed in part because Allen decided to leave Fox for Warner Bros. Estimates of the number of bees used in the production ranged between 15 million and 22 million, including 800,000 bees with their stingers removed to enable the cast to work safely with them. About 100 people were employed in the production to care for and transport the bees during the film shoot. Olivia de Havilland was actually stung by a bee while filming. This was MacMurray's final film.

== Reception ==
=== Box office ===
The film grossed $5,168,142 in its opening weekend in more than 1,200 theaters, and earned Warner Bros. rentals in the United States and Canada of $7.7 million. It was considered a commercial failure.

=== Critical response ===
The film received overwhelmingly negative reviews from critics. It has a score of 5% on Rotten Tomatoes based on twenty-one reviews, with an average rating of 3.80 out of 10. On Metacritic, it has a score of 30 out of 100 based on 6 critical reviews, indicating "generally unfavorable" reviews. It was one of two disaster films (the other being Beyond the Poseidon Adventure) directed solely by the "master of disaster" Allen, who had experience directing several films and many episodes of his TV shows – and both featured Michael Caine in the lead role. The film is listed in Golden Raspberry Award founder John J.B. Wilson's book The Official Razzie Movie Guide as one of the 100 Most Enjoyably Bad Movies Ever Made, where Wilson states that under Allen's unsubtle direction, "despite the enormous production budget, The Swarm turned the tale of an invasion of killer bees into the ultimate B movie".

Vincent Canby of The New York Times called the film "nothing less than the ultimate apotheosis of yesterday's B-movie". Comparing the film unfavorably to recent blockbusters such as Star Wars and Grease, which also evoked old B-movies, he wrote, "Allen merely reproduces a tacky genre while spending a great deal of money doing it. There's not a frame of film, not a twist of plot, not a line of dialogue, not a performance in The Swarm that suggests real appreciation for film history, only a slavish desire to imitate it. That's not enough."

Gene Siskel of the Chicago Tribune gave the film 1½ out of 4 stars, and wrote that it was "surprisingly flaccid in its thrills", explaining: "In these days of Star Wars (which was made for less money), it takes more than a fleet of helicopters and a flameout on the Gulf of Mexico to convince audiences that they are being dazzled." Arthur D. Murphy of Variety called it a "disappointing and tired non-thriller. Killer bees periodically interrupt the arch writing, stilted direction and ludicrous acting."

Kevin Thomas of the Los Angeles Times wrote that the film was "fun in its primitive way", adding, "One wishes it were silent, as were the DeMille epics of the '20s it so closely resembles." Tom Zito of The Washington Post wrote, "While subtlety has never been a strong theme in Allen's films, The Swarm does manage to turn the industrious little honeybee into a menace so seemingly convincing that America may go bee-crazy this summer." Richard Velt in the Wilmington Morning Star stated, "The Swarm may not be the worst movie ever made. I'd have to see them all to be sure. It's certainly as bad as any I've seen." Velt also wrote, "All the actors involved in this fiasco should be ashamed." James Baker of Newsweek declared, "It may be early, but it's probably safe to nominate The Swarm for the worst movie of the year."

The Sunday Times described The Swarm as "simply the worst film ever made", while Time Out magazine called The Swarm a "risibly inadequate disaster movie". Leslie Halliwell called The Swarm a "very obvious disaster movie with risible dialogue", and suggested its commercial failure was partly due to the fact that prior to its release, several American television movies with similar plots had been broadcast. TV Guide said, "The Swarm is a B movie in every sense of the term. Somehow disaster-movie king Allen convinced top Hollywood stars (including five Oscar winners) to appear in this nonsense."

In Leonard Maltin's 2015 publication of movie ratings, the film is rated as a "BOMB".

=== Accolades ===
Despite its large negative reception and box office failure, Paul Zastupnevich was nominated for the Academy Award for Best Costume Design.

Year	Award	Category	Recipients	Result	Ref.
April 9, 1979	Academy Awards	Best Costume Design	Paul Zastupnevich	Nominated	
1979	Stinkers Bad Movie Awards	Worst Picture	The Swarm (Warner Bros.)	Dishonourable Mention	
2003 (expanded ballot)	Stinkers Bad Movie Awards	Worst Picture	The Swarm (Warner Bros.)	Dishonourable Mention	
2003 (expanded ballot)	Stinkers Bad Movie Awards	Worst Director	Irwin Allen	Dishonourable Mention	
2003 (expanded ballot)	Stinkers Bad Movie Awards	Worst Screenplay	The Swarm (Warner Bros.)	Dishonourable Mention	
1980	Golden Turkey Awards	Most "Badly Bumbled Bee" Movie	The Swarm (Warner Bros.)	Won	

== Soundtrack ==
The Swarm Original Motion Picture Soundtrack

Soundtrack album by Jerry Goldsmith
- Released: July 1978
- Recorded: 1978 (The Burbank Studios)
- Genre: Film score
- Length: 35:57
- Label: Warner Bros.
- Producer: Jerry Goldsmith

The musical score was composed and conducted by Academy Award winner Jerry Goldsmith and performed by the Hollywood Studio Symphony. It used French horns and comparable instruments, which were intended to produce sound effects intended to resemble the sound of an apiary mega-swarm. The score originally was released on LP and cassette on Warner Bros. Records in 1978 at the same time as the film's release. An expanded, remastered score was released in 2002 in a limited edition by Prometheus Records and contained over 40 minutes of previously unreleased material. In 2020, La-La Land Records issued a two-CD set with the complete film score and the 1978 soundtrack album.

== Home media and alternate versions ==
The film was originally released in theaters at 116 minutes, and it was first released on VHS in 1981, with the same runtime as the theatrical cut. However, when it was released on laserdisc in 1992, it was extended to 155 minutes with additional scenes. This extended version is also included on all DVD releases worldwide, alongside a 22-minute documentary, Inside The Swarm, and the original theatrical trailer.

It was first released to DVD by Warner Home Video on August 6, 2002, then reissued on December 2, 2014, under their Warner Archive Collection sublabel. The film was released on Blu-ray on September 25, 2018, again through Warner Archive. Like the two previous DVD releases, it contains the 155-minute extended version, the original theatrical trailer and the 22-minute making-of documentary.

In the United States, the film was given a PG rating by the MPAA, while the extended version is unrated. In the United Kingdom, the film was released with an A certificate in 1978. The BBFC rated the extended version 12.

Plaion released The Swarm in 2024 on Blu-ray with both theatrical and extended versions in Germany.

== Disclaimer ==
The closing credits of the film included a disclaimer that read: "The African killer bee portrayed in this film bears absolutely no relationship to the industrious, hardworking American honey bee to which we are indebted for pollinating vital crops that feed our nation." According to an article in HR published on February 24, 1978, the American Bee Association considered taking legal action against the film's producers for defaming the western honey bee, but whether the lawsuit was ever filed is unknown.

== See also ==
- List of 20th century films considered the worst
- Africanized bee
- List of killer bee films
- Die Bienen – Tödliche Bedrohung (a 2008 Killer Bee movie)
