= Trent Dolan =

American film, stage and television actor

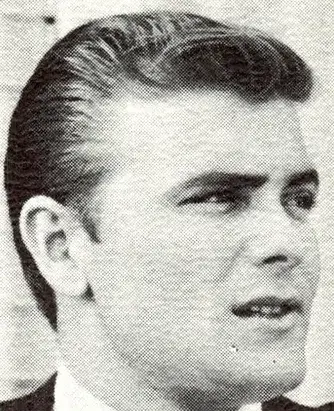
- Born: Steven Louis Skeya Jr. May 5, 1938; Cleveland, Ohio, U.S.
- Died: June 14, 2025 (aged 87); Covina, California, U.S.
- Occupations: Film, stage and television actor

Signature
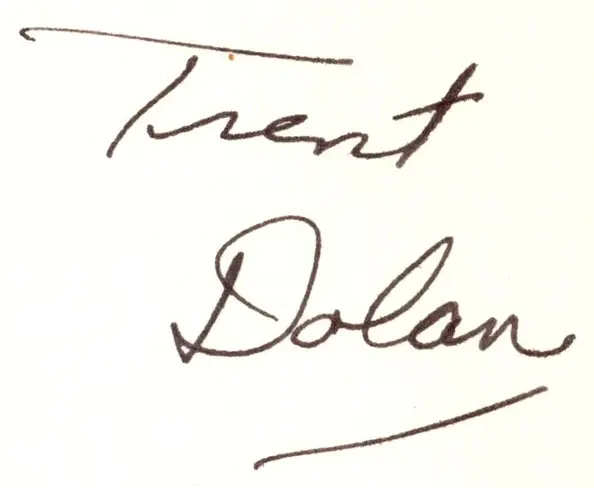

Steven Louis Skeya Jr. (May 5, 1938 – June 14, 2025) was an American film, stage and television actor. He was best known for playing the roles of Allen Hamlin, Private Detective Steel and Commissioner Samuels in the American soap opera television series Days of Our Lives.

== Life and career ==
Dolan was born in Cleveland, Ohio. He began his stage career in the 1950s, and in 1959, he starred as Chester Stamm in the stage play One More, With Feeling. He then began his screen career in 1960, appearing in the film G.I. Blues, playing Mickey. In the same year, he made his television debut in the ABC western television series Maverick. In 1961, he appeared in the television programs Bronco and The Danny Thomas Show.

Later in his career, Dolan guest-starred in television programs including Barney Miller, Mannix, The Six Million Dollar Man, Chico and the Man, Dynasty, Hardcastle and McCormick, Dallas, CHiPs and Knots Landing, and played the roles of Allen Hamlin, Private Detective Steel and Commissioner Samuels in the NBC soap opera television series Days of Our Lives. He also appeared in films such as A Passion to Kill, Raise the Titanic, White Line Fever, The Swarm and Damnation Alley.

Dolan retired from acting in 2001, last appearing in the ABC police procedural television series NYPD Blue.

== Death ==
Dolan died on June 14, 2025, in Covina, California, at the age of 87.
