= Spaceplex =

Indoor amusement park and arcade in New York, US

- Interactive map of Spaceplex
- Location: Nesconset, New York, US
- Coordinates: 40.85649°N 73.15746°W
- Opened: 1991
- Owner: Spaceplex Amusement Centers International Ltd.
- Theme: Indoor arcade with video games bumper cars, more
- Operating season: Year-round

Spaceplex was an indoor amusement park and arcade opened in 1991 at 620 Middle Country Road, Nesconset, New York, United States. Gary Tuzzalo was a co-owner and the general manager, and James Manas was another principal in the parent company, Spaceplex Amusement Centers International Ltd. It is the location where Katie Beers' abductor, John Esposito, claimed to have lost Beers, when in reality she was not taken from there.

A 1993 article in The New York Times Magazine described it thus:

The Spaceplex is an awesome vision of a run-down-Blade-Runnerish future, unlike anything to be found anywhere else in America — yet. Entering the 30-foot-high, 45,000-square-foot rocket hangar is like going through the Gate of Heck. This is Satin's realm: a long black strobe-lighted Techno-throbbing tunnel leads to a soaring, inky dark, cathedral-like cave, its hollows filled with the echoing caterwauling din of a million boops, beeps, boinks and bong-bong-bongs; its blackness flickering with the reflections of a million flashing sensors, registering a billion acts of virtual violence. The official name is the Spaceplex Family Fun Center. It is really Long Island as the virtual future.

The stock of Spaceplex Amusement Centers International Ltd. was among those of seven companies that were manipulated in a fraud scheme by a group of 58 brokers and brokerages charged by the Securities and Exchange Commission in December 1997. The SEC sued 63 individuals and entities in 2000 in related proceedings. Manas pleaded guilty and cooperated with the government's investigation.

Spaceplex filed for Chapter 11 bankruptcy protection on April 16, 1996.

The building that housed Spaceplex later became the site of an indoor sports arena.

It is unrelated to General Dynamics' SpacePlex research facility in the Arrowhead Research Park on the campus of New Mexico State University.
