= Simeon Woods Road =

State highway on Long Island, New York

- New York State Route 901A

Route information
- Maintained by NYSDOT
- Length: 0.67 mi (1,080 m)

Major junctions
- South end: Express Drive North in Hauppauge
- North end: Kings Highway in Hauppauge

Location
- Country: United States
- State: New York
- Counties: Suffolk

Highway system
- New York Highways; Interstate; US; State; Reference; Parkways
← NY 900W	→ NY 901B

Simeon Woods Road is a state highway within the Town of Islip in Suffolk County, on Long Island, New York, United States. It is designated, in its entirety, as the unsigned New York State Route 901A (NY 901A).

== Route description ==
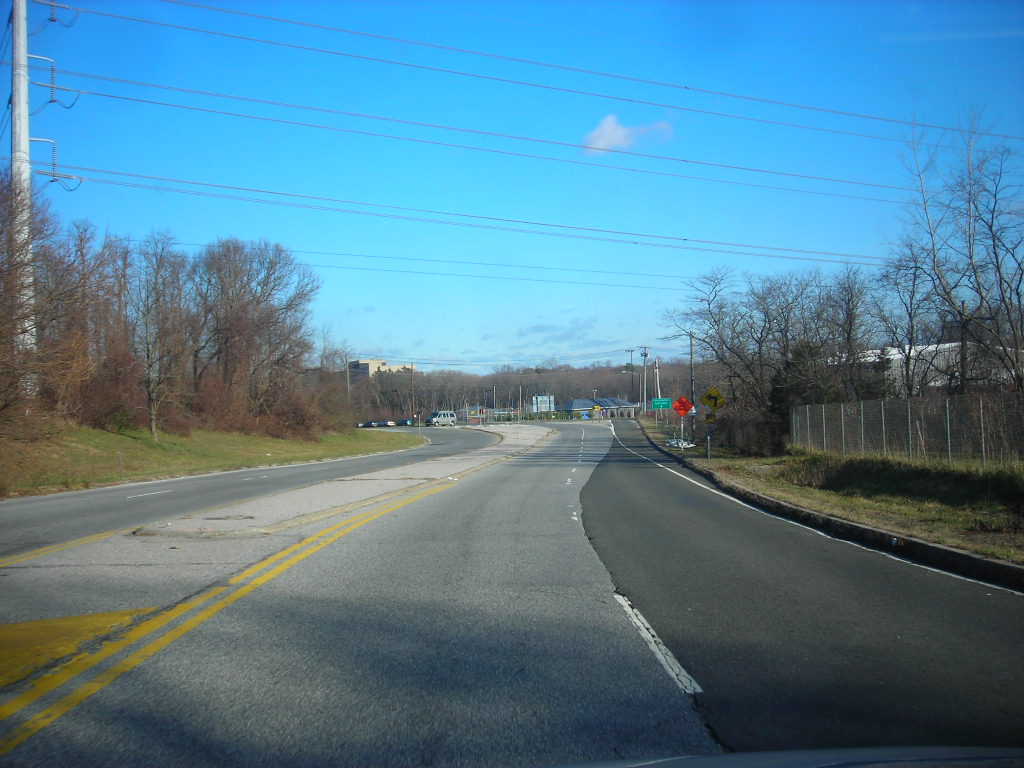
Simeon Woods Road in 2006

Simeon Woods Road provides access to the Suffolk County Government Complex and the New York State Office Building from Interstate 495 (I-495, Long Island Expressway). It begins at Express Drive North, the northern (westbound) service road of the Long Island Expressway. It then continues north-northeast, soon intersecting County Route 6 (CR 6, Rabro Drive) at a signalized intersection. It then continues north-northeast before eventually curving towards the north, before intersecting Kings Highway, where the NY 901A designation terminates.

North of Kings Highway, the road becomes Raoul Wallenberg Drive, providing access to various government buildings and to NY 347/NY 454.

== History ==
In the 1970s, much of Simeon Woods Road was proposed by New York State to be upgraded to serve as a major spur highway, connecting the Long Island Expressway and the Smithtown Bypass (NY 347). However, these plans to turn Simeon Woods Road into a spur highway were eventually scrapped, and the NY 347 designation was instead extended westward along NY 454 to the interchange with the Northern State Parkway.

== Major intersections ==
The entire route is in Hauppauge, Suffolk County.

mi	km	Destinations	Notes
0.00	0.00	Express Drive North	Southern terminus; access to I-495 via Express Drive North
0.47	0.76	CR 6 (Rabro Drive)	
0.67	1.08	Kings Highway	Northern terminus; access to Suffolk County Government Complex and the New York State Office Building, via Raoul Wallenberg Drive
1.000 mi = 1.609 km; 1.000 km = 0.621 mi
