= Smithtown Christian School =

Coordinates: 40.8495°N 73.21°W

Location
- 1 Higbie Drive; Smithtown, New York; United States

Information
- Type: Private
- Motto: A heart for God, a mind for Truth, and a passion to change the World.
- Religious affiliation: Christian
- Established: 1978
- Superintendent: Joel Maus
- Color: Red/Blue
- Athletics conference: New York State Public High School Athletic Association
- Nickname: Knights, formerly Crusaders
- Website: www.learnwithscs.org

Smithtown Christian School is a private school in Smithtown, New York. It was established in 1978 and has students from preschool through twelfth grade.
