= Arthur Herzog =

American author

- Born: April 6, 1927; New York
- Died: May 26, 2010 (aged 83); New York
- Citizenship: United States
- Occupations: Novelist, journalist
- Writing career
- Genres: Science fiction, true crime

Arthur Herzog III (April 6, 1927 – May 26, 2010) was an American novelist, non-fiction writer, and journalist, well known for his works of science fiction and true crime books. He was the son of songwriter Arthur Herzog Jr. He was married to Leslie Mandel and they did not have any children.

He wrote the 1977 novel Orca, which was adapted into the 1977 film of the same title, and his 1974 novel The Swarm was also adapted into a film in 1978.

His 1977 novel Heat is one of the first novels to deal with the subject of climate change from the build-up of carbon dioxide in the atmosphere.

Herzog was also the author of non-fiction books: The Church Trap is a critique of Protestant, Catholic, and Jewish church organization and institutions particularly in the US; 17 Days: The Katie Beers Story is about the kidnapping and child sexual abuse of Katie Beers.

== Bibliography ==
- The Church Trap [non-fiction]. New York, Macmillan, 1968/2003. (ISBN 0-595-27611-3; ISBN 978-0-595-27611-0)
- The Swarm. Simon & Schuster, 1974. (ISBN 0-671-21709-7)
- Earthsound. Simon & Schuster, 1975. (ISBN 0-671-21993-6)
- Orca. Pocket Publishers, 1977. (ISBN 0-671-81138-X)
- Heat. Simon & Schuster, 1977. (ISBN 0-671-22532-4)
- IQ 83. Simon & Schuster, 1978. (ISBN 0-671-22906-0)
- Make Us Happy. Crowell, 1978. (ISBN 0-690-01460-0)
- Glad to be Here. Crowell, 1979. (ISBN 0-690-01818-5)
- Aries Rising: A Novel. Richard Marek Publishers, 1980. (ISBN 0-399-90088-8)
- The Craving. Dell Publishing, 1982. (ISBN 0-440-11014-9)
- Vesco. Doubleday, 1987. (ISBN 0-385-24176-3)
- The Woodchipper Murder. Henry Holt & Company, 1989. (ISBN 0-8050-0753-9)
- 17 Days: The Katie Beers Story, 2003 (ISBN 0-595-27146-4)
- The B.S. Factor. iUniverse, 2003 (ISBN 0-595-27610-5)
- L*S*I*T*T, also called Takeover. (First Published 1983, then 2003)
- A Murder In Our Town (Non Fiction). IUniverse, 2004.
- Icetopia. IUniverse, 2004.
- Beyond Sci-Fi (Short stories). IUniverse, 2007.
- The Third State. IUniverse, 2005.
- The War Peace Establishment (Non Fiction). (First Published 1969, then 2003)
- McCarthy For President (Non Fiction). (First Published 1965, then 2003)
- How To Write Almost Anything Faster And Better (2006)
- Body Parts (Short Stories). IUniverse, 2005.
- Polar Swap. IUniverse, 2008.
- Imortalon. IUniverse, 2004.
- The Town That Moved To Mexico. IUniverse, 2004.
- The Village Buyers. IUniverse, 2003.
- The Edge of Reality. CreateSpace, 2015.

== Filmography ==
- Orca, 1977. Featuring Richard Harris and Charlotte Rampling. Director: Michael Anderson.
- The Swarm, 1978. Featuring: Michael Caine, Richard Chamberlain, Olivia de Havilland, Katharine Ross, Richard Widmark. Director: Irwin Allen.
- Additionally, his science fiction novel IQ 83 is being made into a movie by DreamWorks.
