= David DiVona =

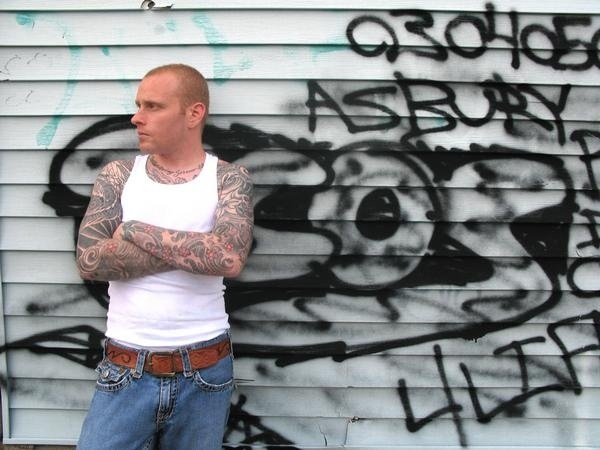
DiVona in Asbury Park New Jersey 2010

David DiVona is an American musician, television personality and producer. He is an original member of the NY rock band Lint. In 2008, he moved into television, first as a host for The Travel Channel show, The Last Adventure and then making the transition to television production. He produced a reality show called Tattoo Turnaround with producing partner, the multiple Emmy Award winning, Conrad Ricketts (Extreme Makeover: Home Edition). The duo has been co-producing reality programs since 2011. He completed the docu-reality show, The Boulevard, produced with George Schlatter and starring Robert Wagner. DiVona is the founder/CEO of Proven Entertainment, the distributor of titles including, among others, Rowan & Martin's Laugh-In. He has also written soundtracks to some non-related productions.

== Personal life ==
David was born in New York City on November 3, 1977, and attended Smithtown high school on Long Island. He currently resides in Los Angeles and is producing original content for television. In 2007, DiVona made an appearance on The Howard Stern Show alongside musician Chris Cornell.
