= Amanda Daflos =

American consultant and deputy mayor

Amanda Daflos is the deputy mayor of strategic partnerships for the City of Los Angeles. Previously, she served as the inaugural executive director of the Bloomberg Center for Public Innovation at Johns Hopkins University. She previously served as the chief innovation officer for the City of Los Angeles. During the COVID-19 pandemic, Daflos served as a key advisor to Mayor Garcetti and oversaw all public health, science and data efforts for the mayor and Los Angeles.

== Education ==
Daflos received her BA from Hamilton College, and received her Masters of Public Administration from the University of Colorado. She studied abroad in Nepal with an immersive six-month Pitzer College program, earning a certificate. In 2014, Daflos graduated from the Leadership Tomorrow program in Seattle.

=== Early life ===
Daflos grew up in Smithtown, NY, on the west end of Suffolk County, on Long Island, in the State of New York. She was elected to serve as student body president for four consecutive years. She graduated from Smithtown High School in 1996.

== Awards ==
- 2009 Social Innovation Spotlight Award from Governor Schwarzenegger
- 2014 National Association of Counties (NACo) Recognition Award
- 2016 Civic Youth Leadership Academy (CYLA) Certificate of Appreciation and Award from Eric Garcetti, Identified as "Not just leaders of the future, but leaders of the now.”
- 2018 Engaging Local Government Leaders Top 100 Local Government Leaders. Listed as #1 on the list.

== Career ==
=== Earlier ventures ===
Daflos's earlier pursuits included working for Deloitte Consulting, where she spent a decade and quickly rose to senior manager. Her focus was government transformation, strategy and technology. She and her projects received multiple awards during her tenure at the world's largest professional services firm. Very early in her career, she founded Aleigh Productions which was a public relations and event coordinating firm that served the government, non-profit and sports industries. She also was the director of programs for the International Mountain Explorers Connection [IMEC] and a project manager for the Juvenile Diabetes Research Foundation in New York.

=== Deloitte Consulting ===
Daflos worked for nearly ten years as a senior manager with Deloitte Consulting, where she drove major government transformation projects at the global level. She led work on major government initiatives including the Affordable Health Care Act and the creation of state-based health care exchanges, child welfare, child support and federal defense. Daflos was deeply involved in Deloitte's community engagement efforts and served on multiple boards and councils focused on advancing women in government. She also served on an advisory council to the CEO.

=== City of Los Angeles ===
==== Innovation team ====
Daflos was hired in 2015 to lead the creation of the Innovation Team (i-team) for Mayor Eric Garcetti in the City of Los Angeles. As a start-up, Daflos led all efforts to create the team, its brand and infrastructure. Under her leadership, the team partnered with nearly thirty agencies in the City of Los Angeles and tackled major reforms ranging from police recruiting and hiring reform to future of work to housing supply. She served in this role for four years before being elevated by the mayor to chief innovation officer to City of Los Angeles where she served as a member of the executive team and was the first person to serve in this role in city history.

==== Paid parental leave ====
In 2018, Daflos and her team chartered an effort to build a business case for paid parental leave for all city employees who previously had no access to leave upon the birth or adoption of a child. After two years of research in partnership with key city leaders, the team presented a data and evidence-based case for paid parental leave for city employees that would have limited to no impact on the city budget. The policy was unanimously approved by Mayor Garcetti and the Los Angeles City Council went into effect in January 2021.

==== Los Angeles Index of Neighborhood Change ====
The Innovation team (created 2015) is attempting to find creative solutions for the rising rates of homeless in Los Angeles and the gentrification and displacements that were resulting from rising rents. Amanda Daflos, worked on finding inclusive data collection to create a strategy to ensure existing residents and businesses do not have to leave their communities. The team was funded through a grant by Bloomberg Philanthropies Innovation Team through the Office of Budget and Innovation in the City of Los Angeles.

==== MyVoiceLa ====
Daflos' Innovation team created the MyVoiceLa online platform for city employees to easily report workplace sexual harassment and assault. It is the first tool of its kind in the City of Los Angeles. The platform informs employees of their rights, and the design was created using crowdsoucring in order to make it the most trauma-informed reporting platform possible. The program also made the code for the site available for any other cities to copy the code and create their own platform for reporting and then investigating these issues. The website was initially made available as a beta tool aimed at testing how users felt. They then incorporated feedback into the final product which officially launched in September 2018.

==== Los Angeles Business Portal ====
Daflos' Innovation Team created the first online tool for the City of Los Angeles aimed at helping businesses understand how to start, maintain and grow their business with the City. The portal is designed to make starting a small business more accessible to Los Angeles residents. The portal guides business owners through location scouting, permitting, and accessing capital. It was designed to be user-friendly and is open source, and meant to be leveraged by other cities. It has won several awards. The portal also shares the experiences of other local business areas and how they approached their funding, permit, and capital processes.

=== Non-profit work in Nepal ===
Daflos studied abroad for seven months in Nepal during her undergraduate career at Hamilton. She learned how to read and write in Nepali. After seeing the country, she founded a school in Maure, Nepal in 2013. She also served as the deputy chief of General Consulate of Nepal in Los Angeles. She organized to send supplies and emergency assistance to Nepal after the 2015 earthquake. Daflos also founded Nepal Trek and Trail Run, to introduce others to the culture and beauty of Nepal.
