= Nesconset, New York =

- Hamlet and census-designated place
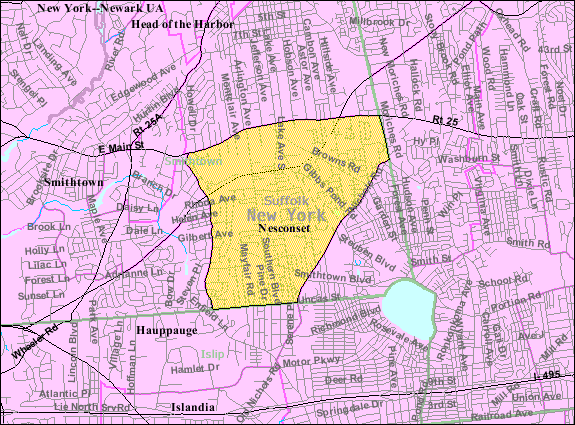
- U.S. Census map

- Location on Long Island Location within the state of New York
- Coordinates: 40°50′46″N 73°9′2″W
- Country: United States
- State: New York
- County: Suffolk
- Town: Smithtown

Area
  - Total: 3.83 sq mi (9.91 km^{2})
  - Land: 3.82 sq mi (9.90 km^{2})
  - Water: 0.0039 sq mi (0.01 km^{2})
- Elevation: 118 ft (36 m)

Population (2020)
  - Total: 13,207
  - Density: 3,455.9/sq mi (1,334.33/km^{2})
- Time zone: UTC-5 (Eastern (EST))
  - Summer (DST): UTC-4 (EDT)
- ZIP code: 11767
- Area codes: 631, 934
- FIPS code: 36-49825
- GNIS feature ID: 0958373

Nesconset is a hamlet and census-designated place (CDP) located within the Town of Smithtown, in Suffolk County, Long Island, New York, United States. The population was 13,207 at the time of the 2020 census.

== History ==
At the time of colonization, the area that would become Nesconset was likely a seasonal hunting ground visited by both eastern Algonquin-speaking and western Munsee-speaking people who lived in clans. These clans likely banded together seasonally to share resources in winter, or to unify against a common threat. By the 18th century, Kieft's War and Old World disease had reduced Long Island's indigenous society to a few thousand people who resided in either reservations or mission-towns across Long Island. From these remaining communities, colonists ascribed tribal names to better identify parties engaging in land transactions. One of these remaining groups was in early Smithtown and would be known to them as the Nissequogue or Nesaquake (a likely descendant of today's Matinecock tribe). The tribe's principal sachem was known as Nassaconsett or Nassetteconsett, for whom Nesconset is named. Early attempts by western scholars to trace the etymology of the name suggest that Nassaconsett was a place name ascribed to the sachem, possibly by European settlers. The proposed etymology from 1911 claims Nassaconsett translates to "at or near the second going over (by wading or otherwise)", likely a reference to a ford on the Nissequogue River. This translation is based on flawed methodology, as it cites a dialect of Algonquin from New England and as such, is subject to inaccuracies. Today, Nasseconsett is thought to be one of the sachems who deeded modern-day Smithtown to Richard Smith, as part of a larger transaction between Smith, Lyon Gardiner and Sachem Wyandance of the Montauketts.

After Smithtown passed a law in 1768 forbidding Algonquin-style living, Nesconset remained largely a deserted stretch of pine barrens. The construction of the Middle Country Road (NY 25) in the same era modestly opened the area to agricultural development.

By the turn of the 19th century, a sparse population of farmers and seasonal residents lived along Middle Country Road and Lake Ronkonkoma. A primitive road network existed as Gibbs Pond Road, Browns Road, Old Nichols Road, Townline Road and the predecessor of Smithtown Boulevard. In 1904, brothers and French immigrants Louis and Clemen Vion came to the Pine Barrens of southeastern Smithtown from Manhattan on numerous occasions as sportsmen. By 1910, the brothers felled a line of trees off of Gibbs Pond Road immediately south of modern-day New York State Route 347 to create Midwood Avenue. They built their home on this street where it is still present.

As the population grew, a lumber yard, general store, and post office were constructed in 1908. The historic Nesconset Schoolhouse was built in 1910 and the Nesconset Fire Department was built by 1935. A commercial center emerged where Lake Avenue South and Gibbs Pond Road meet. The brothers decided to name the newly established settlement after Smithtown's local historical figure, Sachem Nasseconsett, who deeded the Nissequogue tribe's land to Richard Smith.

Later development was concentrated on Lake Avenue South, Southern Boulevard and the Lake Ronkonkoma area along Gibbs Pond Road in the form of summer residences.

By 1930, Nesconset had a population of 50 people along Lake Avenue and spread along Smithtown Boulevard and Gibbs Pond Road. The construction of present-day New York State Route 347 in the 1950s opened the southeast corner of Smithtown to rapid suburban development by bisecting the small center of the hamlet. This caused the shift of the commercial center of Nesconset to Smithtown Boulevard between Old Nichols Road and Southern Boulevard. This area was known formerly as East Hauppauge.

== Geography ==
According to the United States Census Bureau, the CDP has a total area of 3.8 square miles (9.8 km^{2}), all land.

The statistical area defined as Nesconset was expanded in the early 1970s to include a portion of what was Lake Ronkonkoma, New York. The area includes land from Gibbs Pond Road east to School House Road and from Brown's Road south to Smithtown Boulevard.

== Demographics ==
=== 2020 census ===
As of the 2020 census, Nesconset had a population of 13,207. The median age was 44.8 years. 20.7% of residents were under the age of 18 and 19.0% of residents were 65 years of age or older. For every 100 females there were 94.2 males, and for every 100 females age 18 and over there were 91.9 males age 18 and over.

100.0% of residents lived in urban areas, while 0.0% lived in rural areas.

There were 4,560 households in Nesconset, of which 34.3% had children under the age of 18 living in them. Of all households, 62.4% were married-couple households, 12.2% were households with a male householder and no spouse or partner present, and 21.5% were households with a female householder and no spouse or partner present. About 19.1% of all households were made up of individuals and 9.8% had someone living alone who was 65 years of age or older.

There were 4,707 housing units, of which 3.1% were vacant. The homeowner vacancy rate was 0.5% and the rental vacancy rate was 4.5%.

Racial composition as of the 2020 census
Race	Number	Percent
White	10,834	82.0%
Black or African American	226	1.7%
American Indian and Alaska Native	27	0.2%
Asian	849	6.4%
Native Hawaiian and Other Pacific Islander	0	0.0%
Some other race	344	2.6%
Two or more races	927	7.0%
Hispanic or Latino (of any race)	1,186	9.0%

=== 2010 census ===
As of the 2010 census, the CDP had a population of 13,387.

=== 2000 census ===
As of the census of 2000, there were 11,992 people, 3,964 households, and 3,226 families residing in the CDP. The population density was 3,133.5 inhabitants per square mile (1,209.9/km^{2}). There were 4,227 housing units at an average density of 1,104.5 per square mile (426.4/km^{2}). The racial makeup of the CDP was 94.37% White, 0.96% African American, 0.11% Native American, 3.11% Asian, 0.07% Pacific Islander, 0.57% from other races, and 0.82% from two or more races. Hispanic or Latino of any race were 3.36% of the population.

There were 3,964 households, out of which 39.7% had children under the age of 18 living with them, 71.5% were married couples living together, 7.1% had a female householder with no husband present, and 18.6% were non-families. 14.7% of all households were made up of individuals, and 4.0% had someone living alone who was 65 years of age or older. The average household size was 2.97 and the average family size was 3.31.

In the CDP, the population was spread out, with 25.7% under the age of 18, 6.5% from 18 to 24, 32.3% from 25 to 44, 25.8% from 45 to 64, and 9.6% who were 65 years of age or older. The median age was 37 years. For every 100 females, there were 96.0 males. For every 100 females age 18 and over, there were 93.5 males.

The median income for a household in the CDP was $100,350, and the median income for a family was $96,127. Males had a median income of $102,883 versus $96,556 for females. The per capita income for the CDP was $30,794. About 1.6% of families and 2.3% of the population were below the poverty line, including 3.2% of those under age 18 and none of those age 65 or over.

== Education ==
Nesconset lies fully within the Smithtown Central School District. Nesconset also borders the Middle Country Central School District, Hauppauge Union Free School District, and Sachem Central School District.

== Transportation ==
Two state highways pass through Nesconset: Middle Country Road (NY 25) and the Nesconset–Port Jefferson Highway (NY 347). The former forms the CDP's northern border, while the latter traverses Nesconset diagonally; both routes intersect at the Nesconset–St. James border.

== Notable people ==
- Jodi Picoult (born 1966), novelist; grew up in Nesconset
