= Hauppauge (disambiguation) =

Hauppauge (/ˈhɔːpɒɡ/ HOP-og) most commonly refers to refer to Hauppauge, New York, a hamlet on Long Island in the United States.

It may also refer to:

- Hauppauge Computer Works, a computer component company located in Hauppauge, New York
  - Hauppauge MediaMVP, a network media player by Hauppauge Computer Works
- Hauppauge Industrial Association, a business organization in Hauppauge, New York
- Hauppauge Union Free School District in Hauppauge, New York
  - Hauppauge High School
