= Tom Postilio =

American real estate broker and presenter

- Occupations: Real estate broker television personality singer
- Known for: Selling New York
- Website: www.tomandmickey.nyc

Tom Postilio is an American luxury real estate broker, television personality, and former professional singer. He brokers high-end luxury real estate to celebrity clients and is a star of the HGTV reality television show Selling New York.

== Early life and education ==
Postilio was born and raised in Queens, New York City. He was in the first class to attend the prestigious Townsend Harris High School when it reopened in 1984. Shortly thereafter, his family moved from Ozone Park, Queens, to Hauppauge, Long Island. He graduated in 1988 from Hauppauge High School, where he performed in many school musicals.

A fan of Frank Sinatra from an early age, Postilio entered talent shows singing songs the legendary crooner made famous. Postilio won the Newsday Teen Talent Showcase in 1987 and was featured in the New York Times at 19 years old. He graduated from Suffolk County Community College with an associate degree in 1990. He did not pursue further schooling after being invited at age 20 to tour as the featured vocalist with the Glenn Miller Orchestra.

== Real estate career ==
Postilio entered the real estate business at a friend's suggestion and has been ranked as one of the top real estate agents in New York City. He was hired in 2003 by Shaun Osher of Douglas Elliman, the largest residential real estate brokerage in the New York metropolitan area. In 2005, Postilio and Osher left Elliman to start a new real estate brokerage, which would become CORE. In 2015, Postilio and his partner Mickey Conlon rejoined Douglas Elliman, where they worked for several years before moving on to other ventures. At the time, Douglas Elliman Chairman Howard Lorber said, "Tom & Mickey are two of the brightest superstars in the business.” Dottie Herman, Douglas Elliman President & CEO, noted the two were, “well-respected for their collective experience, trusted business relationships and cultural and social influences." Postilio was ranked among the top 1000 Real Estate Professionals in the United States by REAL Trends/The Wall Street Journal.

Postilio is known for working with high-net-worth celebrity clients. He became a star on Selling New York, an HGTV reality show that features brokers selling high-end real estate to some of New York's wealthiest residents. He frequently appears alongside his partner, Mickey Conlon, and the duo have been dubbed the show's "Dream Team." Responsible for more than $1.5B in residential sales, they rank among the most successful real estate brokers in the United States and were named CORE's top-producing agents in 2013 and 2014.

Postilio regularly appears on television as a real estate commentator and host, including CBS's Living Large, Fox's Good Day New York, NBC's Open House, ABC's Good Morning America, and CNBC's Mega Homes Report. He also regularly featured in articles in news publications, including The New York Times, New York Daily News, the New York Post, the Wall Street Journal, Forbes, The Hollywood Reporter, and a variety of real estate trade publications.

Postilio is a member of the Real Estate Board of New York, which has designated him as a Certified Negotiations Expert. He was named a juror for the Architzer A+ Awards, the world's largest architectural awards program.

After Donald Trump announced he would run for president, Postilio and Conlon appeared on Inside Edition to discuss Trump's first mansion in Greenwich, Connecticut, which was listed for $54M, $50M more than Trump paid for the estate in 1982.

In 2007, Postilio was featured in a story about the high cost of New York City parking spots that made international headlines. The story compared the then record $275,000 price for a basement parking space in a Chelsea boutique luxury condominium project at 246 West 17th Street to the cost of cars, homes, and incomes around the world. The valuation was justified by residents and industry economists based on the unavailability of parking and the decline in the number of parking garages in New York City. As of late 2014, the price for some Manhattan parking spaces has exceeded $1M.

== Singing career ==
Postilio won the Newsday Teen Talent Showcase in 1987. At 20, he toured internationally singing the Great American Songbook with the Glenn Miller Orchestra. He traveled with the group for one year, playing in venues in Europe, Asia, and the United States. He received a MAC Award for Outstanding New York Debut and the Backstage Bistro Award for Outstanding Vocalist.

Postilio sang in the Oak Room at New York's Algonquin Hotel and was noted for his Frank Sinatra singing style. The New York Times stated, "his carefully syncopated phrasing and exuberance suggest a softened echo of the late-50s Sinatra in his swinging mode." He released two albums in the 1990s: What Matters Most (Elba, 1993); and Dream (DRG, 1998). After seeing Postilio perform in 1998, Regis Philbin stated on ABC TV's Regis & Kathie Lee, "he looks and sounds like a young Sinatra." His acclaim as a Sinatra-style singer led to his starring role in the Off-Broadway musical, Our Sinatra.

He has appeared on The Today Show, PBS Great Performances, Showbiz Tonight, and BBC News. Postilio returned to the nightclub stage in 2011 with his show "This Time Around,” performed at Feinstein's at Loews Regency in New York.

In 2018, Postilio and partner, Mickey Conlon, became one of New York's top real estate agents with a combined sales at $2 billion.
