= Gold Pure Food Products =

American food manufacturing company

Gold Pure Food Products Co., Inc.

- Horse radish and beets
- Type: Private
- Industry: Food manufacturing (condiments)
- Founded: 1932; 94 years ago in Brooklyn, New York City, New York, United States
- Founder: Tillie Gold, Hyman Gold
- Headquarters: One Brooklyn Road; Hempstead, New York, United States
- Area served: United States
- Products: Horseradish, horseradish sauce, duck sauces, cocktail sauce, mustards, wasabi sauce, salsa, barbecue sauces, steak sauces, sweet and sour sauce, borscht, schav, cabbage soup
- Website: goldshorseradish.com

Gold Pure Food Products Co., Inc. is an American food-manufacturing company located in Hempstead, New York all of whose products have OU Kosher supervision.

Primarily known for manufacturing horseradish, the company is also known for condiments such as mustard, duck sauce, cocktail sauce, salsa and wasabi sauce. Its primary markets are on the East Coast; however, many of Gold's products can be found throughout the United States, and also Brazil, England, South Africa, Russia, Israel and Australia.

In 1996, Gold's held a 70-percent share of the horseradish market.

== History ==
In 1932, Gold's was founded by Tillie and Hyman Gold in their Brooklyn, New York, apartment building, where Tillie grated and bottled horseradish by hand. (Previous to their horseradish business, the couple had repaired and sold radios.) Soon, their children, Morris, Herbert and Manny started helping their father with deliveries, using their bikes and the train as transportation. "My father and I would go by train and he would sell horseradish to the merchants in the area," Morris Gold said. "But I would stay in the station on train side of the turnstile because the profit would be that nickel fare."

The sons built up the business, and by 1956, they needed a bigger working space. So the company built a custom factory from the ground up at 895-905 McDonald Avenue in the Kensington neighborhood of Brooklyn, which the company would call home until 1994, when it settled in Hempstead. Not wanting to stray from their Brooklyn roots, Marc, Steve, Neil and Howard decided to rename the street where the factory currently sits to 1 Brooklyn Road in Hempstead. Former Brooklyn Borough president Howard Golden talked about the move: "Gold's is a vital part of our borough's history. While we regret the departure of this local institution, its legendary horseradish has been, and will continue to be, a tradition that belongs to Brooklyn."

As of 1992, the company was owned and operated by Morris' children, Marc and Steve, and Herbert's children, Neil and Howard. Melissa, Steven's daughter, has been working there since 2002, bringing Gold's into its fourth generation.

Gold's is home to the largest root cellar in the world. Gold's was quoted by Crain's New York Business newspaper as "the largest player in the domestic market for processed horseradish," and "makes more horseradish at its plant than any other manufacturer in the country..."

In the mid-1990s, the New York Mets began using Gold's mustard at the concession stands.

In 2015, the Gold family sold controlling interest in the company to La Salle Capital, a private investment firm based in Chicago. According to Marc Gold, "We wanted to improve the factory and expand the 'Gold' name, which is something that we decided we couldn't do on our own... We felt that LaSalle Capital could take it to the next level." In 2021, LaSalle Capital announced it would close the Gold's manufacturing location in Hempstead, resulting in the layoff of 48 employees, but that production would continue elsewhere.

== Brands ==
=== Nathan's Famous ===
In 1996, Nathan's signed a license agreement with Gold Pure Food Products Co., Inc. to manufacture and distribute Nathan's Famous brand mustard and other condiments to stores throughout the United States.

=== Baker Brands Mustard ===
In 1993, the company agreed to purchase Baker Brands Mustard Co., a Manhattan concern that also made vinegar. "'The solution to increasing sales was to broaden our product line,' says Marc, a grandson of the founder. 'Since the natural sister item to horseradish was mustard – which peaks in summer because of salads and barbecues – we negotiated a purchase of Baker Brands Mustard in 1993.'"

Gold's manufactures under the following brands:

- Gold's
- Nathan's Famous (mustard)
- Chef Allen
- Baker Brands Mustard

== See also ==
- Economy of Long Island
- Economy of New York City
- List of New York companies
