= Smithtown Central School District =

School district in the U.S. state of New York

Location
- Smithtown, Suffolk County, New York; United States
- Coordinates: 40.86616°N 73.19345°W

District information
- Type: Public School District
- Motto: Education is the difference between civilization and chaos
- Grades: PK-12
- Established: Early 1900s
- Superintendent: Dr. Mark Secaur

Students and staff
- District mascot: Bulls
- Colors: Red and blue

Other information
- Schedule: Quarters
- Website: www.smithtown.k12.ny.us

Smithtown Central School District is a school district in New York, United States, which serves residents in Smithtown, Suffolk County, New York on the North Shore of Long Island. It serves approximately 10,000 students in seven elementary schools, three middle schools, and two high schools, and covers an area of 35 square miles (91 km^{2}) out of the 53.75 square miles (139.2 km^{2}) in the town, including the neighborhoods of Village of the Branch, Village of Nissequogue, Nesconset, and Saint James, the majority of Smithtown, and Head of the Harbor and parts of Lake Ronkonkoma, Kings Park and, Hauppauge. The Smithtown Central School District can be found along the Smithtown and Saint James LIRR stations.

== Current schools ==
=== Elementary schools ===
The Smithtown Central School District currently operates on seven elementary schools. Grades kindergarten to fifth grade are served in Smithtown CSD's elementary schools. The regular Smithtown CSD elementary school day lasts 6 hours and 5 minutes. Bus service from WE Transport Inc. and Towne Bus Corp. transports students from home to school and back within an hour from school starting and ending. There are no buses serving the elementary schools at later hours.

The elementary schools contain various clubs for elementary students to join, most before school, some after school. Students receive one teacher throughout the entire day (grades kindergarten to five), except for special classes (i.e. Physical Education, General Music, Art, Library Time).

The elementary schools in the Smithtown CSD are as follows:

- Accompsett Elementary School
- Branch Brook Elementary School (closed)
- Dogwood Elementary School
- Mills Pond Elementary School
- Mt. Pleasant Elementary School
- Nesconset Elementary School (closed)
- Smithtown Elementary School
- St. James Elementary School
- Tackan Elementary School

=== Middle schools ===
The Smithtown Central School District serves students through three different middle schools. Grades six to eight are served in these middle schools. The regular Smithtown CSD middle school day lasts 6 hours and 43 minutes, from 7:50 am to 2:33 pm. Bus service from WE Transport Inc. and Towne Bus Corp. transports students from home to school and back within an hour from school starting and ending. Late buses are available for students staying after school for athletic events or other clubs. These buses are condensed from the normal amount and run at 4:10 pm and at 5:10 pm.

The middle schools contain a number of clubs for middle school students to join, most after school, with some before school. Middle schools in Smithtown contain several academic contests at an interscholastic level. There are athletic teams in Smithtown CSD's middle schools. Teams may be joined automatically or require one to audition in a try out. It is not unusual for a Smithtown sports team to go undefeated in a particular season.

Students follow a bell schedule of a forty-one-minute period, nine-period day. There is a four-minute transition between periods. The school runs on a quarter system, distributing report cards every ten weeks of the 40-week school year. Progress reports are distributed halfway into the ten-week quarter. (Progress reports contain comments that do not go to the final grade of the class as opposed to report cards which contain grades, citizenship markings and comments). The last week of the school year (a 41st week) contains seminars and final exams for these students, including New York State High School Regents Examinations for math and science honors students.

The middle schools in the Smithtown CSD were as follows:

- Accompsett Middle School
- Great Hollow Middle School
- Nesaquake Middle School

In 1992, redistricting led to the consolidation of the three middle schools into Smithtown Middle School, a facility housed in what is now Smithtown High School East. The consolidated middle school contained all sixth, seventh and eighth graders in the Smithtown CSD. The student population grew again, which caused Smithtown Middle School to be split again, first reopening Great Hollow Middle School and then disbursing the rest of its students to Nesaquake and Accompsett Middle Schools when the high school split back into East and West.

=== Smithtown High Schools ===
The Smithtown Central School District serves students through the Smithtown High School on two different campuses, the East Campus in St. James and the West Campus in Smithtown. Grades nine to twelve are served in these high schools. The regular Smithtown CSD high school day lasts 6 hours and 43 minutes, from 7:20 am to 2:03 pm. Bus service from We Transport Inc. and Towne Bus Inc. transports students from home to school and back within an hour from school starting and ending. Depending upon the budget passed by the citizens, late buses may be available for students staying after school for athletic events or other clubs. These buses are condensed from the normal amount and run at 4:00 pm and at 5:00 pm.

The high schools contain many clubs for high school students to join, the great majority after school, and a few before school. High schools in Smithtown contain several academic contest interschool clubs, such as Science Olympiad, Political Awareness Club, DECA, and Academic Quiz Bowl. There may be athletic teams in Smithtown CSD's high schools dependent upon the budget. Teams may be walk-on or require a tryout depending on participation.

Students follow a bell schedule of a 40-minute period, nine-period day. There is a four-minute transition between periods. The school runs on a quarter system, distributing report cards every ten weeks of the 40-week school year. The last weeks of the school year (a 41st and 42nd week) contains and final exams for these students, including New York State High School Regents Examinations required for graduation.

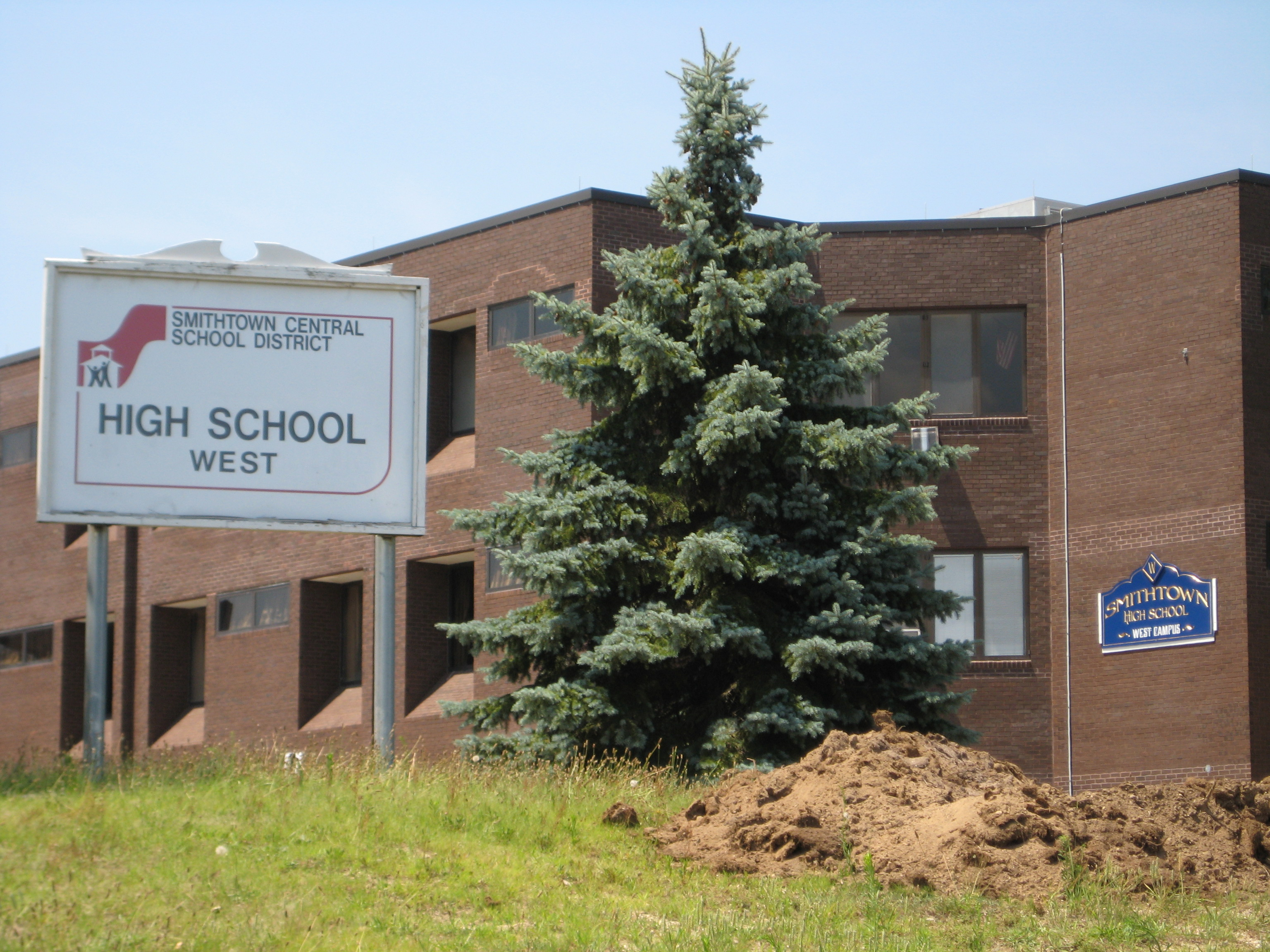
Smithtown High School West

The high schools in the Smithtown CSD are as follows:

- Eastern Campus (St. James, NY)
- Western Campus (Smithtown, NY)

The nickname for the athletic teams for both high schools is the Smithtown Bulls, a moniker adopted in the 1992 consolidation. Blue is the primary color for the Western Campus with red as the accent. Red is the primary color for the Eastern Campus with blue as the accent. Prior to the consolidation, Smithtown East's teams were known as the Indians and Smithtown West's teams were known as the Knights. Smithtown East's colors were red and white and Smithtown West's colors were blue and gold.

== History ==
=== Early history of the district ===
The first Smithtown school still stands today in the Village of the Branch, and it was first used as a school in 1816. Walt Whitman taught at the original Smithtown school in the 1837-38 school year. The original school was relocated to its current location in the Village of the Branch when The Academy was built on the original school's grounds in 1868. The modern Smithtown School District was officially formed alongside the opening of the school in 1868. This school would serve the area for 40 years, until its replacement in 1908. The New York Avenue School opened in 1925 and at first served first grade all the way to twelfth when it opened. In 1950 it became a junior-senior high school. In the latter half of the 1950s, it was known as Smithtown Central High School. A large population boom caused great growth in the early 1970s, where Accompsett Intermediate School opened in 1971 and the opening of Smithtown High School East in 1973, with Smithtown High School becoming Smithtown High School West. Populations would then decline in the 1970s and 1980s, with the district having to close five elementary schools and one intermediate school.

=== District reconfiguring ===
Prior to 1992, the district had three intermediate/middle schools and two high schools. As the population decline came to a head, the district consolidated in 1992. The district went from three middle schools to one, and the new Smithtown Middle School was the former Smithtown High School East, which had been removed as well. Now there was just one Smithtown middle school and one Smithtown high School. Accompsett then became a Freshman Campus. Later in the decade, enrollment returned and the old configuration returned. Three middle schools, all still in the district today, were put in place (Accompsett, Great Hollow, and Nesaquake). Smithtown Middle School was also reverted back into Smithtown High School East and Smithtown High School once again became Smithtown High School West. The first school to return was Great Hollow for the 1999-2000 school year.

=== Receiving Hauppauge students ===
Due to the school district of Smithtown being one of the older ones in the area, it received students from another district early in their history. In the days before the Hauppauge Union Free School District had Hauppauge High School (or any high school), students in Hauppauge went to either Smithtown High School or Islip High School. The determining factor on which school students went to was very likely what town they lived in, as the modern Hauppauge district straddles the Town of Smithtown and the Town of Islip.

== Former Smithtown schools ==
=== New York Avenue Junior High School ===
The building located at 26 New York Avenue was formerly a junior high school, which served students grades seven through nine. It served the middle-western portion of the Smithtown Central School District. Graduating students of the New York Avenue Junior High School would enter Smithtown High School (West). In its time, the New York Avenue Junior High School operated along with three other junior high schools in the district, Great Hollow Junior High School, Accompsett Intermediate High School and Nesaquake Junior High School. Today it serves its function as the district's central office, adult education programs, and board of education meetings. It is also known as the Joseph M. Barton building.

=== Smithtown Branch High School ===
Prior to the opening of Smithtown Central High School building in St. James in 1960, Smithtown High School operated out of the New York Avenue school building. At some point, before the opening of the Lawrence Avenue Elementary school, the New York Avenue building served as a K through 12 school.

== Notable faculty ==
Walt Whitman taught in the Smithtown school district during 1837 and 1838 in a one-room school house and had 85 students on his roster although at the time attendance wasn't compulsory and the actual attendance was usually much smaller.

Richard Specht taught science at Great Hollow Middle School, while Samantha Specht teaches German at Smithtown High School East and Smithtown High School West. After the death of their 22-month-old son, Richard Edwin-Ehmer Specht "Rees", during the fall of 2012, they founded ReesSpecht Life, promoting random acts of kindness. The foundation has distributed 750,000 "Kindness Cards" worldwide.

== Notable alumni ==
- Jay Beckenstein - founding member of jazz fusion band Spyro Gyra
- Frank Catalanotto - Major League baseball player
- Mickey Conlon - real-estate broker, star of HGTV's Selling New York
- John Curtis - Major League baseball player
- John Daly - 2010 Olympics
- Buck Dharma - founding member of Blue Öyster Cult
- Ilana Glazer - comedian, co-creator, Broad City
- Jodi Hauptman - art historian
- William Heyen - author, National Book Award Finalist
- J57 - rapper, hip hop producer
- Andrew Levy - ombudsman for Red Eye with Greg Gutfeld
- Jim Mecir - Major League baseball player
- Soledad O'Brien - journalist, host of Matter of Fact with Soledad O'Brien
- Rob Pannell - professional lacrosse player
- Jodi Picoult - author
- John Reiner - cartoonist, The Lockhorns
- Jai Rodriguez - Queer Eye for the Straight Guy star
- Jeremy Wall - founding member of jazz fusion band Spyro Gyra
- Matt Yallof - sportscaster
