= Mickey Conlon =

American real-estate broker (born 1976)

- Born: 1976 (age 49–50); Smithtown, New York, US
- Education: Duke University
- Occupations: Real Estate Broker; Television Personality; Broadway Producer
- Years active: 1990–present
- Known for: Selling New York
- Title: television personality
- Website: tomandmickey.nyc

Mickey Conlon is an American luxury real-estate broker, television personality and former Broadway producer. He is known for brokering luxury high end real estate to a celebrity clientele and is a star of the HGTV reality television series Selling New York.

== Early life and education ==
Conlon grew up in Saint James, Long Island and graduated from Smithtown High School in 1994. As a freshman at Duke University, he obtained his real estate license at the age of 18. When he would come home to Long Island during school breaks, he sold houses at a boutique real estate firm that specialized in historic properties. Conlon also pursued musical theatre during his time in school, directing and starring in several productions with Hoof 'n' Horn, Duke University's musical theatre group. He worked for British producer Cameron Mackintosh while studying abroad in London and in New York. He graduated from Duke in 1998 and began to pursue a career as a producer on Broadway.

== Career ==
Conlon began his career on Broadway and his productions received multiple Tony Award nominations. His most recent production was the 2010 Broadway show All About Me starring Michael Feinstein and Dame Edna. His Playbill biography notes that he was "Hailed in 1982 as the David Merrick of the Monkey Bars," a tongue-in-cheek nod to the late producer who was the subject of Howard Kissel's biography, The Abominable Showman. Conlon found it difficult to obtain financing for his shows after the 2008 financial crisis and decided to return to real estate. He worked as a broker for Brown Harris Stevens, a luxury residential real estate firm in New York.

While working at Brown Harris Stevens as a Vice President and Director, he and Tom Postilio, a founding member of the New York real estate brokerage CORE, decided to strengthen their independent business models by merging. The two joined forces and began working together at CORE in 2011. Conlon has been brokering high-profile deals for many celebrity clients, including David Sanborn, Michael Feinstein, and Joan Collins. Collins was featured in an episode of the reality television show Selling New York on which Conlon is a main cast member. He was also interviewed in a feature on Good Morning America called "Try Before You Buy," examining a trend of allowing prospective buyers to "test drive" real estate.

Conlon and his partner Tom Postilio rank among the most successful real estate brokers in the United States and were named CORE's top-producers in 2013 and 2014. They are responsible for more than $1.5 billion in residential sales.

Conlon is best known as a star of HGTV's reality series, Selling New York. His appearances frequently feature him alongside his partner, Tom Postilio. The duo have been dubbed the show's "Dream Team," and Conlon is frequently singled out for his distinctive sense of fashion, along with his bow ties. In addition to his role on Selling New York, Conlon has appeared on numerous television shows as a real estate commentator and host, including CBS's Living Large, NBC's Extra! and Open House, ABC's Good Morning America, CNBC's Mega Homes Report, and Inside Edition. He has also been featured in articles in several publications, including The New York Times, New York Daily News, the New York Post, the Wall Street Journal, Forbes, The Hollywood Reporter, and a variety of real estate trade publications.

On the heels of Donald Trump's announcement of his candidacy for the office of President of the United States, Conlon appeared with Postilio on Inside Edition to discuss the candidate's first mansion in Greenwich, Connecticut that was listed for $54 million, $50 million more than Trump paid for the estate when he bought it in 1982. Conlon has been designated a Certified Negotiations Expert by the Real Estate Board of New York, of which he is a member. He is a juror for the Architzer A+ Awards, the world's largest architectural awards program. Conlon was ranked among the top 1000 Real Estate Professionals in the United States by REAL Trends / The Wall Street Journal.

== Personal life ==
Although best known for his work in luxury real estate and on Broadway, Conlon has declared his interest in vintage automobiles, The Great American Songbook, and the life and work of playwright and composer Noël Coward and Gilded Age Architect Stanford White. A frequent fixture of New York's social scene, he has appeared regularly on Page Six, New York Social Diary, and in Cindy Adams’ nationally syndicated column, and has been linked to a wide array of celebrities from the worlds of music, film, television, and Broadway. Conlon and Tom Postilio are partners in business and life. The duo work together in real estate, but have also sung together on stage at Feinstein's at Loews Regency in New York, and at The Leading Men benefit at Birdland.
