= HIA =

HIA may refer to:

== Airports ==
- Hamad International Airport, in Doha, Qatar
- Harrisburg International Airport, in Pennsylvania, United States
- Huai'an Lianshui Airport (IATA: HIA), in Jiangsu Province, China

== Organizations ==
- Hauppauge Industrial Association, an American trade organization
- Health Initiative of the Americas, an advocacy group in California
- Hemp Industries Association, a North American trade organization
- Hoonah Indian Association, a federally recognized Native American tribe in Alaska
- Housing Industry Association, an Australian trade organization
- Northern Ireland Historical Institutional Abuse Inquiry or HIA Inquiry

== Other uses ==
- Hampton-in-Arden railway station, England, station code
- Health impact assessment
- Health Insurance Associate, a designation from America's Health Insurance Plans.
- Hendrik-Ido-Ambacht, town in the Netherlands
- Herzberg Institute of Astrophysics
- Hia (magazine), an Arabic women's magazine
- Higher Intelligence Agency, a British electronic music project
- Highlands and Islands Alliance, a defunct Scottish political party
- Hoover Institution Archives (HIA)
- Lamang language, ISO 639-3 code
