= Nick Fanti =

American baseball player (born 1996)

Staten Island FerryHawks
- Pitcher
- Born: December 30, 1996 (age 29); Smithtown, New York, U.S.
- Bats: Left Throws: Left
- Stats at Baseball Reference

Nicholas Fanti (born December 30, 1996) is an American professional baseball pitcher for the Staten Island FerryHawks of the Atlantic League of Professional Baseball. He was drafted by the Philadelphia Phillies in the 31st round of the 2015 Major League Baseball draft.

== Career ==
Fanti attended Hauppauge High School in Hauppauge, New York. As a senior, he pitched consecutive no-hitters for the school's baseball team. In his senior year, he won the Carl Yastrzemski Award, given to the best high school baseball player in Suffolk County. He committed to attend Marist College.

=== Philadelphia Phillies ===
The Philadelphia Phillies drafted Fanti in the 31st round, with the 924th overall selection, of the 2015 Major League Baseball draft. He signed with the Phillies, and made his professional debut with the Gulf Coast Phillies of the Rookie-level Gulf Coast League after he signed, posting a 2.55 ERA in 1.72 innings. He also pitched for the Gulf Coast Phillies in 2016, going 7-0 with a 1.57 ERA in 11 games. Fanti pitched for the Italian national baseball team in the 2017 World Baseball Classic.

Pitching for the Lakewood BlueClaws of the Single–A South Atlantic League in 2017, Fanti pitched the first 8 2/3 innings of a no-hitter on May 6. He threw a no-hitter on July 17, allowing just one base runner against the Charleston RiverDogs, becoming the first Blueclaws pitcher to throw a complete-game, no-hitter since 2002. In 21 total games for Lakewood, he posted a 9-2 record and 2.54 ERA.

In 2018, Fanti made 6 starts for the High-A Clearwater Threshers, posting a 3-3 record and 7.22 ERA with 18 strikeouts in 28.2 innings pitched. Fanti signed with the Sydney Blue Sox of the Australian Baseball League for the 2018/19 season.

Fanti missed the entire 2019 season while dealing with a shoulder injury. He did not play in a game in 2020 due to the cancellation of the minor league season because of the COVID-19 pandemic. On May 1, 2021, Fanti underwent Tommy John surgery and missed the entire 2021 season. On November 7, 2021, Fanti elected free agency.

On May 24, 2022, Fanti re-signed with the Phillies on a minor league contract and was assigned to the Florida Complex League Phillies. However, he did not make an appearance for the organization and was released on August 1.

=== Long Island Ducks ===
On June 21, 2024, Fanti signed with the Long Island Ducks of the Atlantic League of Professional Baseball. In six appearances for the Ducks, he recorded a 2.25 ERA with 11 strikeouts across eight innings pitched. Fanti became a free agent following the season.

=== Staten Island FerryHawks ===
On June 25, 2026, Fanti signed with the Staten Island FerryHawks of the Atlantic League of Professional Baseball.

== Personal life ==
Fanti has four older sisters.
