= Economy of Long Island =

Long Island is one of the world's most urbanized and highly developed islands. As of 2022, Long Island had a population over 8 million people. Between 2014 and 2019, Long Island experienced a 4.3% growth in jobs. Median income on the island is $112,000 and the median home price is $450,000. Among those over the age of 25, 42.6% hold a college degree or higher educationally.

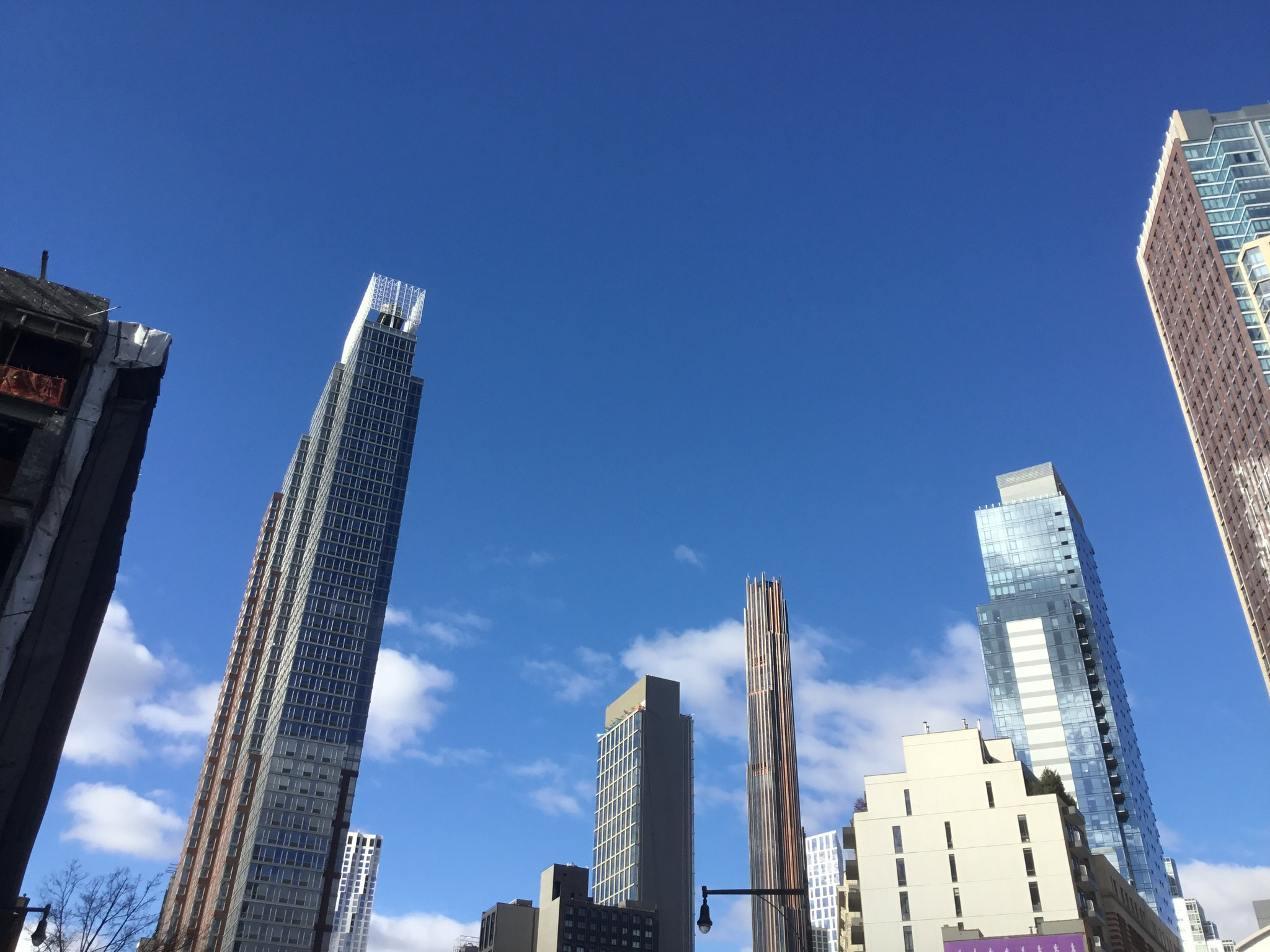
Downtown Brooklyn

== GDP ==
As of 2024, Long Island had a gross domestic product of $558 billion – or around 20% of the New York metropolitan area.

County	GDP (billions, US$)	Population (2024)	GDP per capita (US$)
Kings	145.934	2,658,657	54,890
Suffolk	139.014	1,543,330	90,074
Nassau	130.222	1,397,783	93,163
Queens	111.143	2,367,034	46,954
Long Island	558.301	7,966,804	70,078

== Affluence ==
The counties of Nassau and Suffolk have long been renowned for their affluence and high standard of living. This affluence is especially pervasive among the hamlets and villages on the North Shore of Long Island as far as western Suffolk, the extreme eastern South Shore (home to the Hamptons) and several wealthy pockets along the South Shore further west. However, nearly all of Long Island (especially Nassau County and western Suffolk County) is extremely expensive to live in by national standards.

Northern Long Island is home to some of the most expensive mansions in the country. In 2005, the most expensive residence in the country was Three Ponds in Bridgehampton. Several of the nation's largest private residences are also on Long Island, including financier Ira Rennert's, Fair Field, in the Southampton village of Sagaponack and the country's second largest home, Oheka Castle. Long Island is home to the luxury communities of the Hamptons, Cold Spring Harbor, Dix Hills, Huntington Bay, and Lloyd Harbor in Suffolk County, and Hewlett Bay Park, Cove Neck, Oyster Bay Cove, Laurel Hollow, Sands Point, Roslyn, Brookville, Old Brookville, Upper Brookville, Lattingtown, Matinecock, Muttontown, Hewlett Harbor, Garden City, Stewart Manor, and Manhasset in Nassau County.

== Aviation industry ==
Long Island industry has long benefited from its proximity to New York City. During the 1930s, the island developed an aviation industry, and until about 1990 was considered one of the aviation centers of the United States, with companies such as Grumman Aircraft having their headquarters and factories in the Bethpage area. Grumman was long a major supplier of warplanes for the U.S. Navy and the Marine Corps, as seen in many movies. Prominent WW-II Grumman aircraft included the F4F Wildcat and F6F Hellcat fighters, and the TBF Avenger torpedo bomber. Following WW II, the Grumman A-6 Intruder were utilized by the US Navy and USMC until their retirement in the 1990s, and the Grumman E-2 Hawkeye, first introduced in 1964, is still in service with the US Navy. In more recent years, Grumman produced the Grumman F-14 Tomcat, a fighter aircraft deployed on U.S. aircraft carriers from 1974 to 2006. Obtained by the Shah of Iran in the 1970s when Iran was an ally, F-14 Tomcat has been placed in service as fighters by the Islamic Republic of Iran Air Force, where it still may be active. The Grumman EA-6B Prowler was also deployed by the US Navy and US Marine Corps, until its respective retirements by each service in 2015 and 2019. Grumman was also prominent in the US space program, being the producer of the Apollo Lunar Excursion Module.

In their early decades, aerospace-related companies were concentrated on Long Island, especially in eastern Nassau County in the Bethpage area. Over the years, the industry also diversified to other locations. The Sperry Gyroscope company did very well during WW-II as military demand skyrocketed; it specialized in high technology devices such as gyrocompasses, analog computer-controlled bombsights, airborne radar systems, and automated take-off and landing systems. These became jumping-off points into the multibillion-dollar annually avionics business. During the Cold War decade of the 1950s, part of Sperry Gyroscope was moved to Phoenix, Arizona. This was to try to preserve parts of this vital defense company in the event of nuclear warfare. Both on Long Island and in Arizona, Sperry continued to excel in avionics, and it also provided avionics systems for such NASA programs as the Space Shuttle.

The Cradle of Aviation Museum illustrates and celebrates Long Island aviation.

Long island is home to major divisions of the aircraft systems manufacturer, B/E Aerospace. Their products range from cabin lighting assemblies to aircraft lavatory systems.

== Science and engineering ==
Long Island has played a prominent role in scientific research and in engineering. It was once the home of the Grumman Aircraft factories where all the Apollo program Lunar Module spacecraft were built; and it still is the home of the Brookhaven National Laboratories in nuclear physics and United States Department of Energy research, as well as physics and astrophysics research projects at Stony Brook University. Additionally, Cold Spring Harbor Laboratory is a leading government-funded research laboratory specializing in biomedical education and research. All of these continuing facilities make Long Island a leading high-technology research area for government research.

In the mid to late 20th century, companies such as Sperry Rand and Computer Associates, headquartered in Islandia, made Long Island a center for the computer industry. Gentiva Health Services, a national provider of home health and pharmacy services, was once headquartered on Long Island, but is now based in Atlanta, Georgia.

Long Island was home to the first transatlantic radio broadcast, from Rocky Point, New York to Paris, France.

== Agriculture ==
Long Island, NY is rich in farming history and features many produce farms located on both the North Shore and South Shores. Because the western and central regions of the island are now largely devoted to residential use, the East End of the island is now the primary agricultural area of Long Island.

East End farms and farmers' markets are the major providers of Long Island's remaining supplies of locally grown fruits, berries, vegetables, poultry, and dairy products. Some farms offer pick-your-own peaches, apples, and pumpkins. This has become a traditional spring, summer, and fall outing for many Long Island residents. The island also still has a considerable area and resources, even in Nassau County, devoted to landscaping horticulture.

=== Long Island wine ===
In little over quarter of a century the Long Island wine industry has grown from one vineyard to 3,000 acres (12 km^{2}) of vines in thirty wineries. The island's maritime climate, geography and soil characteristics provide good winegrowing conditions.

The Long Island wine region formally encompasses all of Nassau County and Suffolk County, but most island vineyards are located on the North and South Forks. Some of the vineyards can grow European varietal grapes, while others concentrate on hybrid grapes that are better-adapted to North American conditions of climate and pest resistance. Some winery examples are: Palmer Vineyards, Macari Vineyards, Bedell Cellars, Pindar Vineyards, Wolffer Estate Vineyard and Martha Clara Vineyards.

== News and media ==
Long Island is the home of one major newspaper and several smaller newspapers and radio stations. Newsday has one of the largest circulations of all U.S. daily newspapers. The Long Island Press is a weekly paper begun in 2003. The Suffolk Life, based in Riverhead, the lone competitor to Newsday, was founded in 1961 and went out of business in 2008. There are a few specialty newspapers such as the Long Island Business News and there are several weeklies, such as the Express News Group based in the affluent Hamptons that cover smaller community news and current events in the Long Island Communities in East Hampton, Southampton and Sag Harbor. News 12, once owned and operated by Cablevision System Corp (now Optimum), is the only Long Island TV cable news channel. Western Suffolk County is home to several newspaper chains. The Smithtown Messenger (founded in 1887) is currently owned by Messenger Papers, Inc., which also publishes the Islip Messenger (formerly the Ronkonkoma Review) and the Brookhaven Messenger (formerly the Brookhaven Review). News 12 also provides local news separately to Brooklyn, Westchester and New Jersey to each of the areas it serves through its cable delivery services. In addition, the metropolitan area is served by PBS' Long Island affiliate, WLIW, with the 3rd largest public television viewership in the U.S., has a national audience

== Tourism ==
Tourism in the area is primarily focused on the summer season, on Fire Island and on the East End, with visitors attracted by the natural environment, parks and beaches on Long Island. The North fork on the east end of Suffolk County is known for its fishing villages, tourist towns, ferries to Connecticut and its neighbors, and for the area's wineries. The South fork has similar tourist attractions including golf, equestrian, boating, surfing, and fine dining in the Hamptons and Montauk. Patchogue is also host to the Patchogue Theatre for the Performing Arts, which is also the official home theater of the Atlantic Wind Symphony.

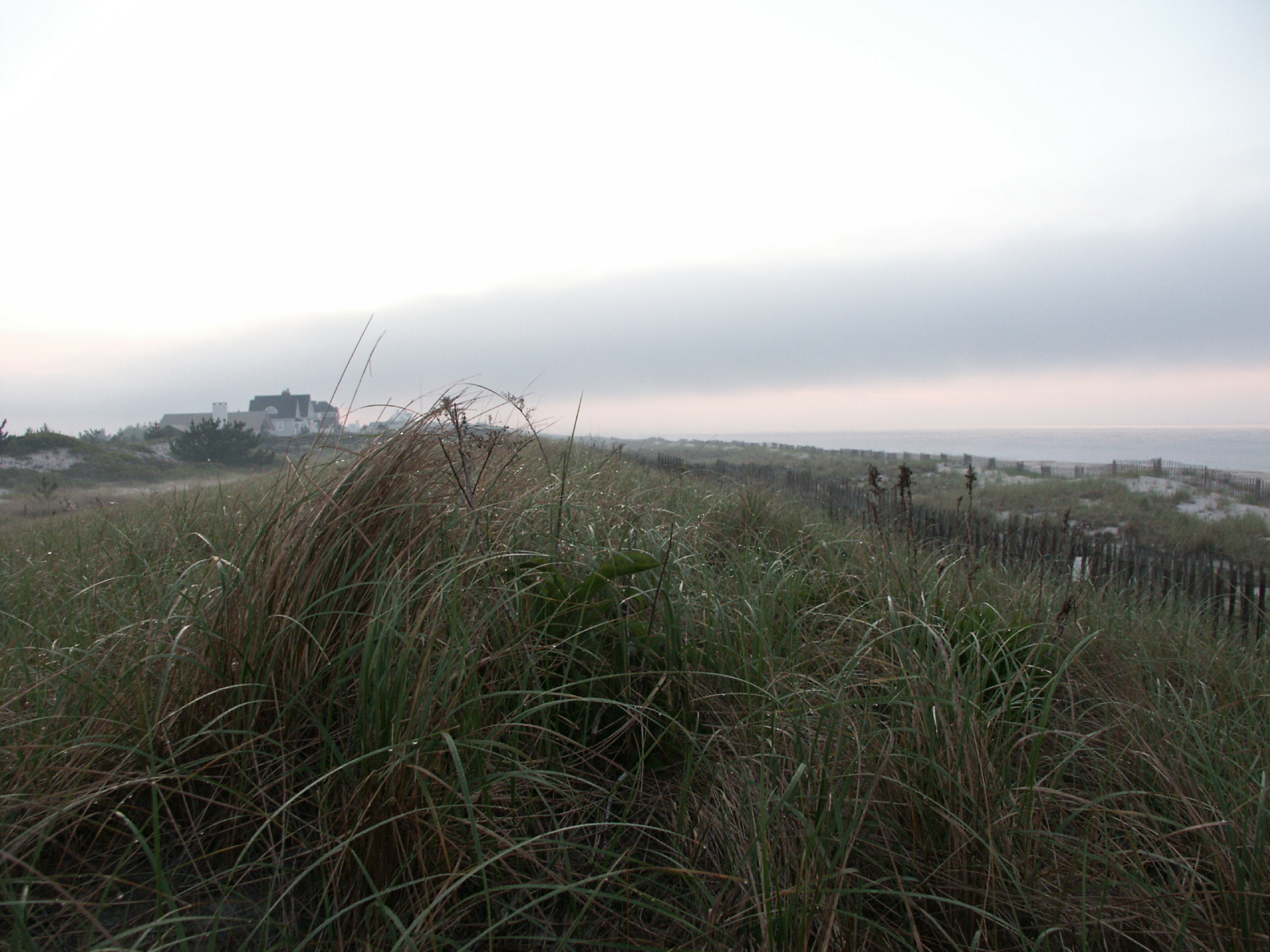
Sunrise in Quogue

Villages are additional tourist destinations on the Island. Some tourism is local Long Islanders visiting nearby friendly villages. Villages that attract surrounding communities include Huntington Village, Northport Village, Islip Hamlet, Port Jefferson Village, Sayville, and Cold Spring Harbor in Suffolk County. Roslyn Village, Great Neck, The City of Long Beach, The City of Glen Cove, Massapequa Park and Rockville Centre, Garden City are popular Nassau County villages. Discover Long Island provides information about tourism on Long Island.

== Other industries ==
Fishing continues to be an important industry, especially at Northport and Montauk. In fact, following the demise of the oyster industry in the 1950s when oysters had all but disappeared, through concerted efforts by New York state, local government and the resources of Cornell Cooperative Extension’s Marine Research Facility in Southold to develop new technology in support of the sector, Suffolk County, in particular, has revitalized the oyster industry through oyster farming. As of 2018, there were 82 registered permits issued for oyster farming, according to the state Department of Conservation.

In 2025, Suffolk County passed legislation to protect working waterfronts, citing the "2,949 maritime-related businesses employing approximately 38,419 people—6.1% of the County's economy (NOAA, 2021)." as well as the tremendous pressures faced by the industry, particularly from developers, as reasons for the decision.

Since World War II, Long Island has become increasingly suburban and, in some areas, fully urbanized. Levittown was only the first of many new suburbs, and businesses followed residential development eastward.

Long Island is home to the Hauppauge Industrial Park, which was at one time, the East Coast's largest industrial park. The park has over 1,300 companies, and employs over 55,000 Long Islanders. Companies in the park and abroad are represented by the Hauppauge Industrial Association. It is noticeable to anyone visiting the park, that there is an abundance of For Rent or For Lease signs marking many of the properties. Many corporations that had long-term leases and moved out of facilities in the park, are still bound under lease-obligations. An example would be the news organization, Reuters Group, which occupies 3 separate facilities there, but shuttered its sites when it was acquired by the Thomson Corporation to become Thomson Reuters, in 2008. By sight alone, it appears that about 20-30% of the properties in the industrial park have been vacated.

A growing entertainment industry presence can also be found on the Island. Most recently producer Mitchell Kriegman established Wainscott Studios in Water Mill, where the PBS children's show It's a Big Big World is shot.

== Transportation infrastructure ==
As a hub of commercial aviation, Long Island is home to two of the New York City metropolitan area's three busiest airports, JFK International Airport and LaGuardia Airport, (Note: The third major airport is Newark Liberty International Airport in Newark, New Jersey) in addition to Long Island MacArthur Airport; as well as two major air traffic control radar facilities, the New York TRACON and the New York ARTCC. Nine bridges and thirteen navigable tunnels (road and railroad tunnels but not metropolitan water tunnels) connect Brooklyn and Queens to the three other boroughs of New York City. Ferries connect Suffolk County northward across Long Island Sound to the state of Connecticut. The Long Island Rail Road is the busiest commuter railroad in North America and operates continually.

== Education ==
Nassau County high school students often feature prominently as winners of the International Science and Engineering Fair and similar STEM-based academic awards. Biotechnology companies and scientific research play a significant role in Long Island's economy, including research facilities at Brookhaven National Laboratory, Cold Spring Harbor Laboratory, Stony Brook University, New York Institute of Technology, Plum Island Animal Disease Center, the New York University Tandon School of Engineering, the City University of New York, and Hofstra Northwell School of Medicine.

== Largest employers ==
According to Newsday, the largest employers on Long Island, as of 2017, are:

#	Employer	# of employees
1	Northwell Health	31,153
2	State of New York	20,304
3	Catholic Health Services of Long Island	17,000
4	Nassau County	16,784
5	US Federal Government	16,391
6	Suffolk County	11,075
7	Stop & Shop	8,100
8	Winthrop-University Hospital	7,700
9	Long Island Rail Road	6,960
10	Walmart	5,056
11	Town of Hempstead	4,550
12	Home Depot	4,361
13	CVS	3,983
14	Nassau Board of Cooperative Educational Services	3,755
15	King Kullen	3,649

According to the Bureau of Economic Analysis, in 2017 the employment of Suffolk and Nassau counties in the following sectors was:

Sector	Nassau County	Suffolk County	Total	Percent
Health care and social assistance	149,349	107,764	257,113	14.3%
Retail trade	92,484	90,881	183,365	10.2%
Local government	69,597	72,882	142,479	7.9%
Finance and insurance	81,354	58,030	139,384	7.7%
Professional, scientific, and technical services	71,148	66,618	137,766	7.7%
Real estate and rental and leasing	73,725	45,175	118,900	6.6%
Accommodation and food services	54,754	55,404	110,158	6.1%
Construction	42,483	64,781	107,264	6.0%
Other services (except government)	54,770	49,147	103,917	5.8%
Administrative and support and waste management and remediation services	45,394	54,894	100,288	5.6%
Manufacturing	19,623	56,521	76,144	4.2%
Wholesale trade	31,738	44,166	75,904	4.2%
Transportation and warehousing	25,260	25,577	50,837	2.8%
Educational services	32,207	18,225	50,432	2.8%
Arts, entertainment, and recreation	21,334	20,695	42,029	2.3%
State government	4,879	21,281	26,160	1.5%
Information	13,058	10,352	23,410	1.3%
Management of companies and enterprises	11,527	9,740	21,267	1.2%
Federal civilian	5,287	11,214	16,501	0.9%
Utilities	4,422	1,038	5,460	0.3%
Military	2,559	2,549	5,108	0.3%
Farming	99	3,007	3,106	0.2%
Forestry, fishing, and related activities	Not reported	1,556	1,556	0.1%
Mining, quarrying, and oil and gas extraction	Not reported	714	714	0.0%
Total	908,475	892,211	1,800,686	100.0%

== See also ==
- Economy of New York (state)
- Economy of New York City
- History of Long Island#Late 2000s recession
