= Economy of New York City =

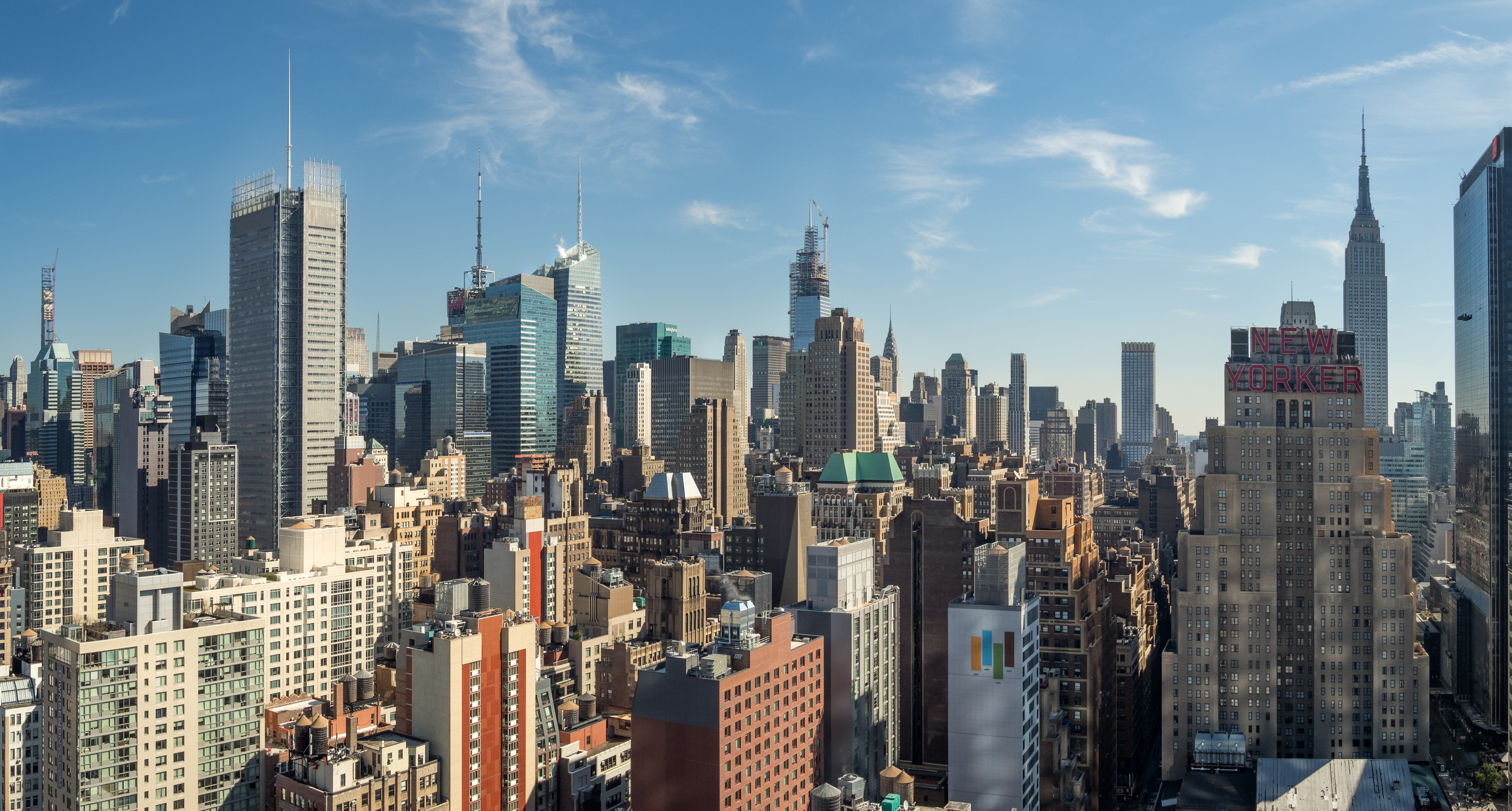
Looking from the West Side toward the East Side of Midtown Manhattan in New York City, the largest central business district in the world. Manhattan, which alone produces a GDP exceeding US$1 trillion, is the epicenter of the world's principal metropolitan economy.

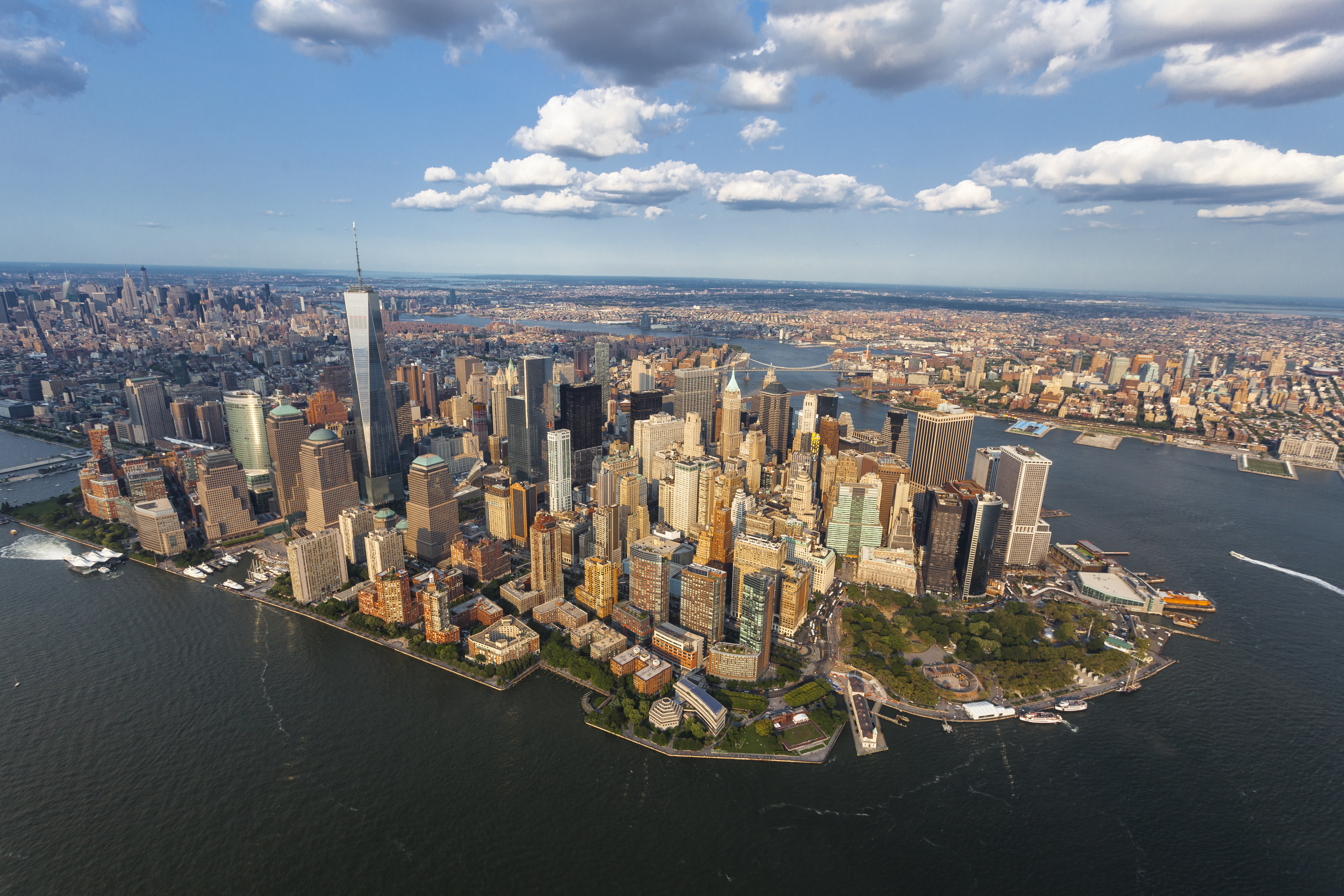
Lower Manhattan, the home of Wall Street, anchors New York City's role as the world's principal fintech and financial center.

The economy of New York City encompasses the largest municipal and regional economy in the United States. In 2023, the New York City Metropolitan Area generated a GMP of US$2.299 trillion. Anchored by Wall Street in Lower Manhattan, New York City has been characterized as the world's premier fintech and financial center. The city is home to the NASDAQ (headquartered in Times Square) and the New York Stock Exchange (NYSE, headquartered on Wall Street), the world's two largest stock exchanges by both market capitalization and trading activity.

New York City, with its center in Manhattan, is the world's leading center of technology, health care, banking, finance, and communication, and academic research. Many of the world's largest corporations are headquartered in Manhattan. The borough contained over 500 million square feet (46.5 million m^{2}) of office space in 2015, making it the largest office market in the United States. Midtown Manhattan, with nearly 400 million square feet (37.2 million m^{2}) that same year, is the largest central business district in the world. New York City is distinctive for its high concentrations of advanced service sector firms in the law, accountancy, banking, and management consultancy fields. It is the top global center for the advertising industry, which is metonymously called "Madison Avenue". Silicon Alley, metonymous for New York's broad-spectrum high technology sphere, continues to expand.

Finance, techonology, (including AI and medical technology) health care and life sciences research, high technology and biotechnology, real estate, and insurance all form the basis of New York City's economy. The city is also the nation's most important center for mass media, journalism, and publishing. Also, it is the country's preeminent arts center. Creative industries such as digital media, advertising, fashion, design, and architecture account for a growing share of employment. New York City possesses strong competitive advantages in these industries. Despite declining, manufacturing remains consequential. The Port of New York and New Jersey is a major economic engine, handling a maritime cargo volume in the ten months through October 2022 of over 8.2 million TEUs, benefitting post-Panamax from the expansion of the Panama Canal, and accelerating ahead of California seaports in monthly cargo volumes.

== GDP ==
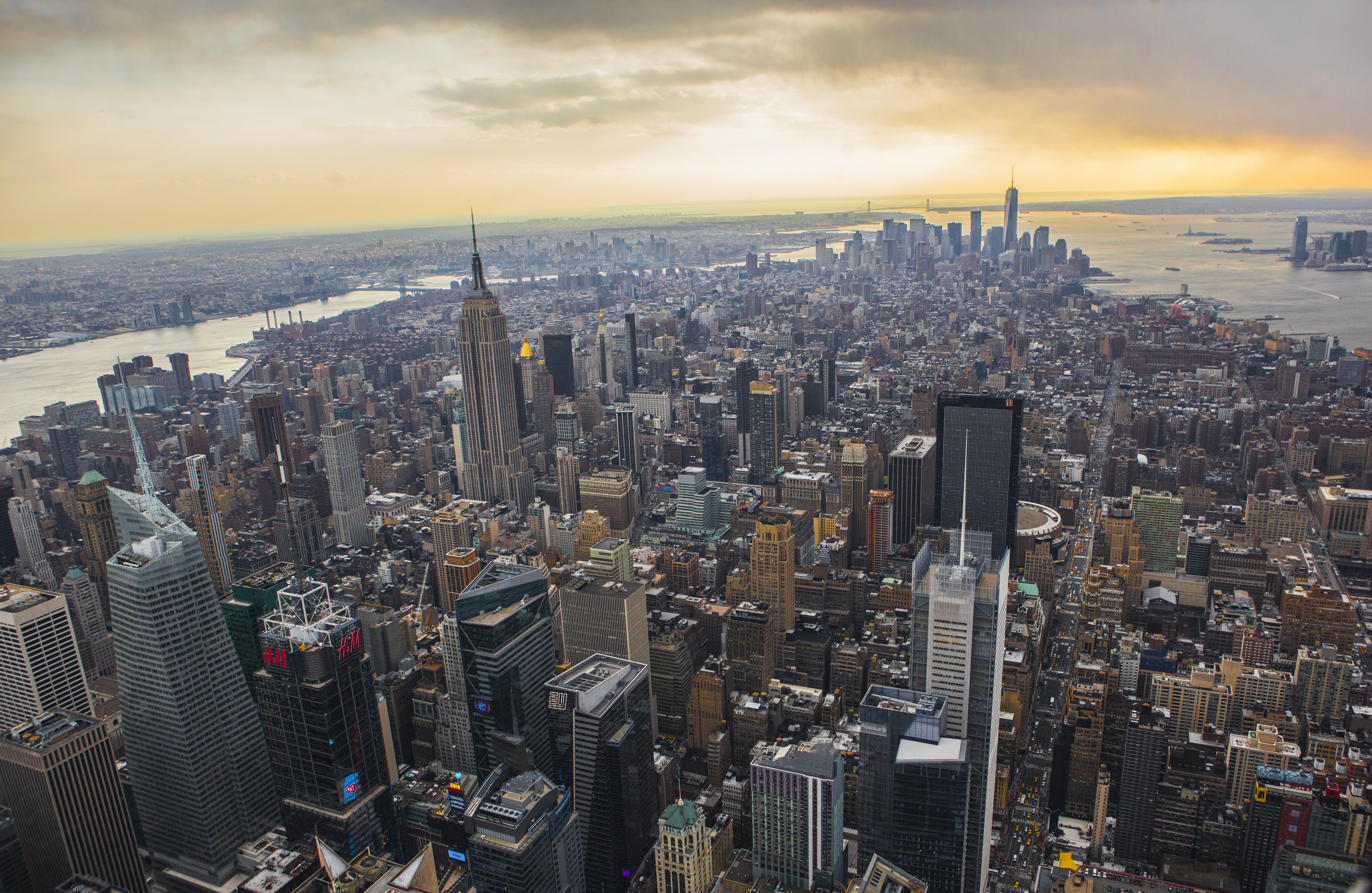
Manhattan's GDP surpassed $1.0 trillion, in 2024

In 2024, the GDP of New York City was around $1.354 trillion, of which $1.007 trillion, or 3/4th, was Manhattan.

County	GDP (billions, US$)	Population (2024)	GDP per capita (US$)
Manhattan	1,006.673	1,665,510	604,619
Kings	145.934	2,658,657	54,890
Queens	111.144	2,367,034	46,954
Bronx	58.323	1,406,052	41,479
Richmond	23.779	499,572	47,598
New York City	1,377.840	8,596,825	160,273

== City economic overview ==
Top publicly traded companies in New York City (ranked by 2015 revenues) with City and U.S. ranks
NYC	corporation	US
1	Verizon Communications	13
2	JPMorgan Chase	23
3	Citigroup	29
4	MetLife	40
5	American International Group	49
6	Pfizer (pharmaceuticals)	55
7	New York Life	61
8	Goldman Sachs	74
9	Morgan Stanley	78
10	TIAA (Teachers Ins. & Annuity)	82
11	INTL FCStone	83
12	American Express	85
Every firm's revenue exceeded $30 billion
Financial services firms in green
Full table at Economy of New York City
Source: Fortune 500

New York City is a global hub of business and commerce, as a center for banking and finance, retailing, world trade, transportation, tourism, real estate, new media, traditional media, advertising, legal services, accountancy, insurance, theater, fashion, and the arts in the United States; while Silicon Alley, metonymous for New York's broad-spectrum high technology sphere, continues to expand. The Port of New York and New Jersey is also a major economic engine, handling record cargo volume in 2017, over 6.7 million TEUs. New York City's unemployment rate fell to its record low of 4.0% in September 2018.

Many Fortune 500 corporations are headquartered in New York City, as are a large number of multinational corporations. One out of ten private sector jobs in the city is with a foreign company. New York City has been ranked first among cities across the globe in attracting capital, business, and tourists. This ability to attract foreign investment helped New York City top the FDi Magazine American Cities of the Future ranking for 2013. In 2017, there were 205,592 employer firms in New York City, of which 131,584 of these firms were shown to be owned by men, and 45,114 were shown to be owned by women. Of those firms, 64,514 were owned by minorities, and 125,877 were shown to be owned by non-minorities. Veterans owned 5,506 of those firms.

As of 2013, the global advertising agencies of Omnicom Group and Interpublic Group, both based in Manhattan, had combined annual revenues of approximately US$21 billion, reflecting New York City's role as the top global center for the advertising industry, which is metonymously known as "Madison Avenue". The city's fashion industry provides approximately 180,000 employees with $11 billion in annual wages.

Other important economic sectors include medical research and technology, non-profit institutions, and universities. Manufacturing accounts for a significant but declining share of employment. Food processing is a US$5 billion industry that employs more than 19,000 residents.

Chocolate is New York City's leading specialty food export, with over US$200 million worth of exports annually. Entrepreneurs were forming a "Chocolate District" in Brooklyn as of 2014, while Godiva, one of the world's largest chocolatiers, continues to be headquartered in Manhattan.

== Wall Street ==
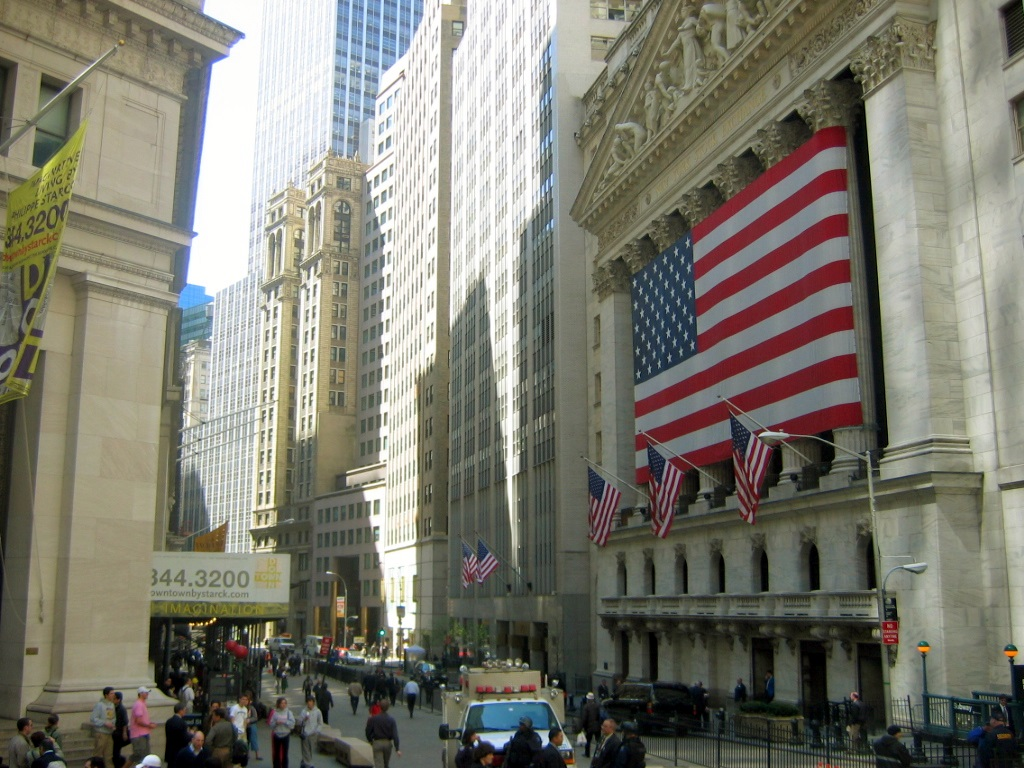
The New York Stock Exchange on Wall Street, the world's largest stock exchange per total market capitalization of its listed companies

New York City's most important economic sector lies in its role as the headquarters for the U.S. financial industry, metonymously known as "Wall Street". The city's securities industry, accounting for 181,300 jobs in 2018, continues to form the largest segment of the city's financial sector and an important economic engine, accounting for about 5% of the city's private sector jobs in 2018, 6% (US$3.7 billion) of city tax revenue, 17% (US$13.2 billion) of state tax revenue, and a fifth of the city's total wages. Employees in the securities industry earned an average salary (including bonuses) of $398,600 in 2018. 60% of these employees live in the city, 32% are immigrants, 51% hold only a bachelor's degree, and 39% hold an advanced degree. This high earning industry contributes significantly to the general economy of New York City, with 1 in 10 jobs being associated with the industry, and an estimated three jobs created per one job created in the securities industry. Many large financial companies are headquartered in New York City, and the city is also home to a burgeoning number of financial startup companies.

Lower Manhattan is home to the New York Stock Exchange, on Wall Street, and the Nasdaq, at 165 Broadway, representing the world's largest and second largest stock exchanges, respectively, when measured both by overall average daily trading volume and by total market capitalization of their listed companies. Investment banking fees on Wall Street totaled approximately $54.9 billion in 2018. New York City remains the largest global center for trading in public equity and debt capital markets, driven in part by the size and financial development of the U.S. economy. New York also leads in hedge fund management; private equity; and the monetary volume of mergers and acquisitions. Several investment banks and investment managers headquartered in the city are important participants in other global financial centers. Some of the largest commercial and investment banks in the world are headquartered in New York City: including JPMorgan Chase & Co., Citigroup Inc., The Goldman Sachs Group Inc., and Morgan Stanley.

== Tech and biotech ==
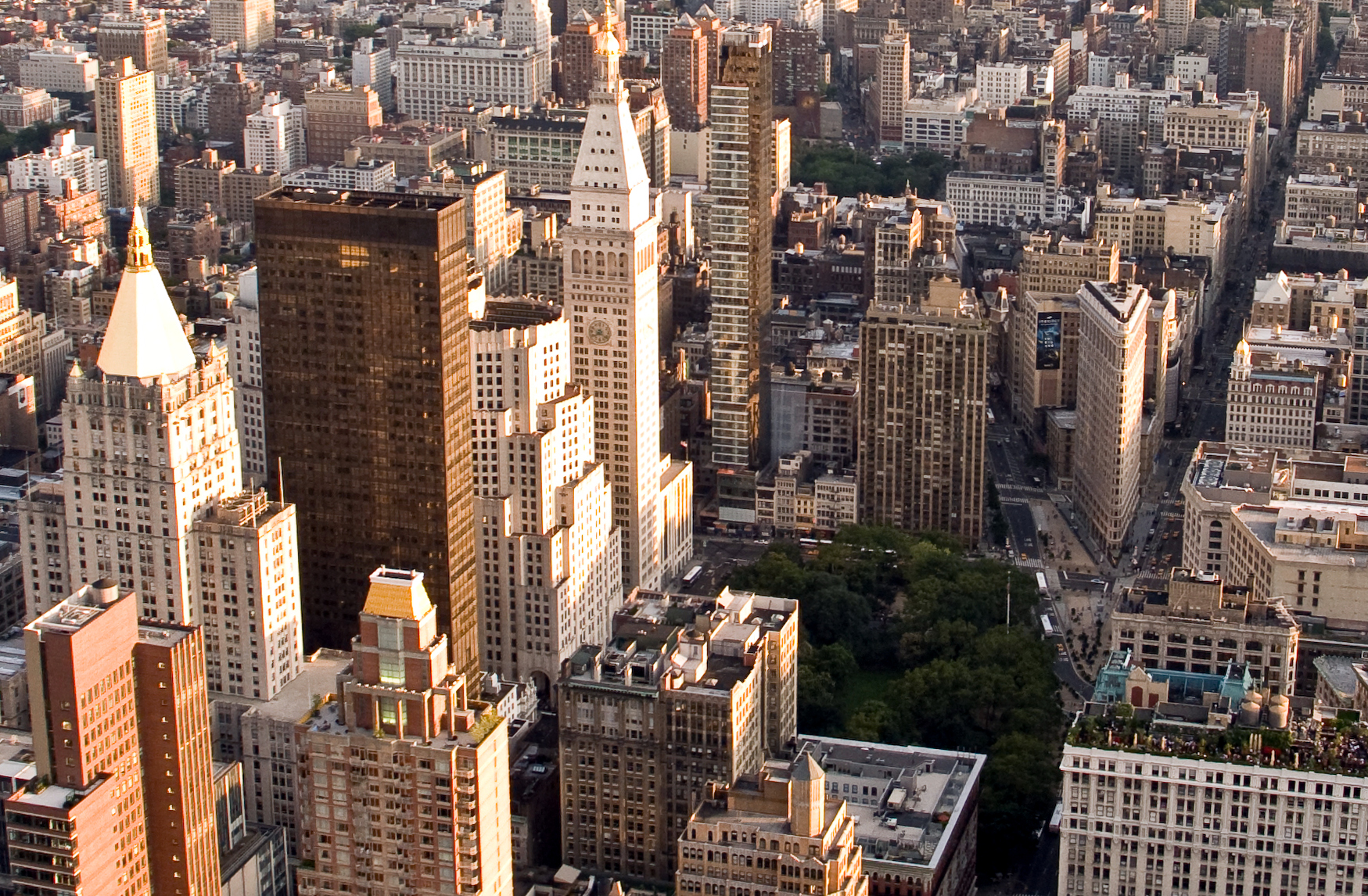
Silicon Alley, once centered around the Flatiron District, is now metonymous for New York's high tech sector, which has since expanded beyond the area.

New York is a top-tier global high technology hub. New York's tech universe incorporates artificial intelligence, the Internet, new media, telecommunications, digital media, software development, biotechnology, game design, financial technology ("FinTech"), and other fields within information technology that are supported by its entrepreneurship ecosystem and venture capital investments. In 2015, Silicon Alley generated over US$7.3 billion in venture capital investment across a broad spectrum of high technology enterprises, most based in Manhattan, with others in Brooklyn, Queens, and elsewhere in the region. High technology startup companies and employment are growing in New York City and the metropolitan region, bolstered by the city's position in North America as the leading Internet hub and telecommunications center, including its vicinity to several transatlantic fiber optic trunk lines, New York's intellectual capital, and its extensive outdoor wireless connectivity. Verizon Communications, headquartered at 140 West Street in Lower Manhattan, was at the final stages in 2014 of completing a US$3 billion fiberoptic telecommunications upgrade throughout New York City. As of 2014, New York City hosted 300,000 employees in the tech sector. The technology sector has been claiming a greater share of New York City's economy since 2010.

The biotechnology sector is also growing in New York City, driven by the city's strength in academic scientific research and public and commercial financial support. On December 19, 2011, then Mayor Michael R. Bloomberg announced his choice of Cornell University and Technion-Israel Institute of Technology to build a US$2 billion graduate school of applied sciences called Cornell Tech on Roosevelt Island with the goal of transforming New York City into the world's premier technology capital. By mid-2014, Accelerator, a biotech investment firm, had raised more than US$30 million from investors, including Eli Lilly and Company, Pfizer, and Johnson & Johnson, for initial funding to create biotechnology startups at the Alexandria Center for Life Science, which encompasses more than 700,000 square feet (65,000 m^{2}) on East 29th Street and promotes collaboration among scientists and entrepreneurs at the center and with nearby academic, medical, and research institutions. The New York City Economic Development Corporation's Early Stage Life Sciences Funding Initiative and venture capital partners, including Celgene, General Electric Ventures, and Eli Lilly, committed a minimum of US$100 million to help launch 15 to 20 ventures in life sciences and biotechnology.

== Health care ==
Research and medical services drive New York's healthcare industry. The city has the most post-graduate life sciences degrees awarded annually in the United States, 60,000 licensed physicians, and 127 Nobel laureates with roots in local institutions. New York receives the second-highest amount of annual funding from the National Institutes of Health among all U.S. cities, after Boston.

Health care industry employs approximately 565,000 people in New York City, according to the U.S. Census, making it the city's 2nd largest employer, after government. In New York, the 565,000 people work at more than 70 hospitals, and the city's 20 public hospitals serve 1.5 million inpatients yearly.

== Diamond district ==
From the mid-19th century until the 1920s, New York's diamond trade was centered on Maiden Lane near Wall Street. As rents increased in the 1920s, diamond businesses relocated to 47th Street. The area's significance grew during World War II as refugee diamond merchants fled to New York. Post-WWII, Jewish merchants from Antwerp, Tel Aviv, and New York dominated the industry. Hebrew and Yiddish were as common as English amongst the merchants. Despite changes in demographics, the district's business practices have remained traditional. The New York Times described 47th Street as "a 17th-century industry in a 21st-century city." The district has survived Times Square's decline in the 1970s and 1980s and more recent gentrification, remaining a hub of cramped retail space and manufacturing amidst high Manhattan rents. Today, the area is characterized by a diverse mix of elderly, ultra-Orthodox Jews, South and Central Asians, and merchants from around the world conducting business openly on the sidewalk, reminiscent of an old world bazaar. The Smithsonian magazine remarked the importance of family and community ties due to high levels of trust required in the diamond trade. The magazine further remarked how even in New York, trade was reputation based and businesses family oriented in order to maintain trust.

== Real estate ==
Real estate is a major force in the city's economy, as the total value of all New York City property was assessed at US$1.072 trillion for the 2017 fiscal year, an increase of 10.6% from the previous year with 89% of the increase coming from market effects. The Time Warner Center is the property with the highest-listed market value in the city, at US$1.1 billion in 2006. New York City is home to some of the nation's—and the world's—most valuable real estate. 450 Park Avenue was sold on July 2, 2007, for US$510 million, about $1,589 per square foot ($17,104/m^{2}), breaking the barely month-old record for an American office building of $1,476 per square foot ($15,887/m^{2}) set in the June 2007 sale of 660 Madison Avenue. According to Forbes, in 2014, Manhattan was home to six of the top ten ZIP Codes in the United States by median housing price. Fifth Avenue in Midtown Manhattan commands the highest retail rents in the world, at US$3,000 per square foot ($32,000/m^{2}) in 2017. In 2019, the most expensive home sale ever in the United States achieved completion in Manhattan, at a selling price of US$238 million, for a 24,000 square feet (2,200 m^{2}) penthouse apartment overlooking Central Park.

== Manufacturing ==
Manufacturing accounts for a significant share of employment. Garments, chemicals, metal products, processed foods, and furniture are some of the principal products. The food-processing industry is the most stable major manufacturing sector in the city. Food making is a $5 billion industry that employs more than 19,000 residents, many of them immigrants who speak little English. Chocolate is New York City's leading specialty-food export, with $234 million worth of exports each year.

There are over 233,000 manufacturing jobs in more than 10,000 New York City industrial businesses , with the highest concentration of industrial employment in Manhattan. This includes manufacturing, warehousing, utilities, and transportation. Manufacturing jobs average $41,000 annually (NYS DOL, 2nd Qtr 2005), about $10,000 more than comparable jobs in retail or restaurants. The manufacturing sector has the highest percentage of first-generation immigrants making up 64% of the workforce (NYC Dept. City Planning) and African Americans comprising 78% of the production workforce (2004 American Community Survey).

These are small businesses, with an average size of 21 employees (NYS DOL, 2nd Qtr 2005). Examples of goods manufactured in the city include Broadway costumes, custom-made cabinets, croissants for hotels, and wooden crates for shipping fine art. These items are labor-intensive and require collaboration between the end-user and the manufacturer. In recent years, as real estate and globalization pressures have increased, the remaining manufacturers have become more design-oriented and single customer-focused. To boot, production methods have become cleaner and more technology-driven.

Despite the adaptability of New York manufacturers, there remain looming challenges to the sector's survival. A 2003 city-sponsored survey of the industrial sector identified three major local challenges to retaining businesses: 1) high cost of real estate; 2) high costs of doing business; and, 3) uncertainty about land use policy.

A 12,900-square-foot (1,200 m^{2}) biodiesel plant run by Tri-State Biodiesel, LLC began construction in the Bronx in 2010. The facility processes used cooking oil collected by TSB from over 2000 New York restaurants with methanol and a catalyst to create biodiesel fuel. More than 1 million US gallons (3,800 m^{3}) of waste oil could be collected in Brooklyn every year according to a 2004 Cornell study. The fuel produces 78 percent less carbon-dioxide emissions than standard diesel.

=== Garments ===
The city's apparel and garment industry was historically centered on the Garment District in Manhattan. The garment industry has been significant in labor history, with Jewish, Italian, and Hispanic, and (more recently) Chinese immigrants successively laboring in the industry. Key events have been the formation of the International Ladies' Garment Workers' Union in 1900 and the formation of Amalgamated Clothing Workers Union in 1914; the New York shirtwaist strike of 1909; and the Triangle Shirtwaist Factory fire in 1911, in which 146 perished. The industry peaked around 1950, when more than 323,000 workers were employed in the industry in New York. In 2015, fewer than 23,000 New York City residents were employed in the manufacture of garments, accessories, and finished textiles, although efforts to revive the industry were underway. As of 2009, there were slightly fewer than 1,600 garment manufacturing businesses in the city, of which about a quarter were located in or around the Garment District, which has about 830,000 square feet (77,000 m^{2}) of manufacturing space. Growth of the city's manufacturing industry has occurred in Brooklyn Army Terminal at Sunset Park, Brooklyn.

== Trade ==
The City of New York has a large number of foreign corporations. One out of every ten private sector jobs in the city is with a foreign company. This makes the perspective of New York's business community internationalist and at odds with Washington's foreign policy, trade policy, and visa policy.

Since 2000, China has been New York's leading growth market for exports. The New York Metropolitan Region is home to more than half of the 32 largest Chinese companies with offices in the United States. These companies represent a broad array of industries including shipping, steel, energy and manufacturing firms, and services. Many have chosen to open headquarters in New York in anticipation of eventual listing on the respective New York stock exchanges and entering U.S. capital markets. New York City currently hosts seven Chinese daily newspapers, two Chinese language television stations, and the largest Chinese neighborhood in the United States. New York area airports provide 12 daily flights to Hong Kong and five to Beijing, the most flights out of the eastern half of the United States.

International shipping has always been a major part of the city's economy because of New York's natural harbor, but with the advent of containerization most cargo shipping has moved from the Brooklyn waterfront across the harbor to the Port Newark-Elizabeth Marine Terminal in New Jersey. Some cargo shipping remains; for example, Brooklyn still handles the majority of cocoa bean imports to the United States.

== Media ==
New York is an important center for American mass media, journalism, and publishing. The city is the top media market in the United States, with 7% of the country's television-viewing households. Three of the Big Four music recording companies have their headquarters in the city. More than 200 newspapers and 350 consumer magazines have an office in the city. The book publishing industry alone employs 25,000 people. For these and other reasons, New York is often called "the media capital of the world".

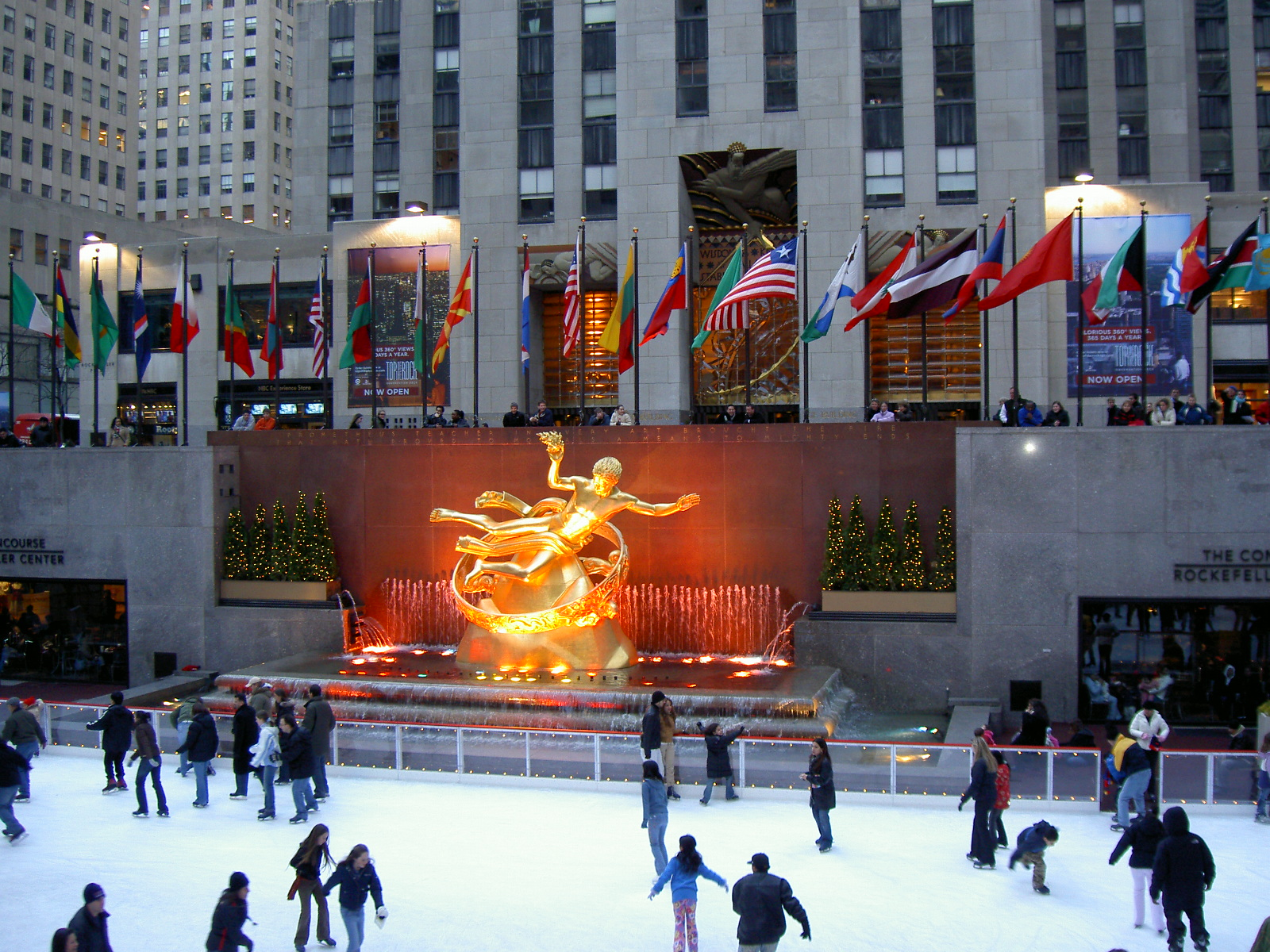
Rockefeller Center is home to NBC Studios.

Many of the world's largest media conglomerates are also based in the city.

=== Film ===
New York is a prominent location for the American entertainment industry, with many films, television series, books, and other media being set there. New York City is the second largest center for filmmaking and television production in the United States, producing about 200 feature films annually, employing 130,000 individuals; the filmed entertainment industry has been growing in New York, contributing nearly US$9 billion to the New York City economy alone as of 2015, and by volume, New York is the world leader in independent film production – one-third of all American independent films are produced in New York City. The Association of Independent Commercial Producers is also based in New York. In the first five months of 2014 alone, location filming for television pilots in New York City exceeded the record production levels for all of 2013, with New York surpassing Los Angeles as the top North American city for the same distinction during the 2013/2014 cycle.

== Top publicly traded companies in New York ==
Fortune 500 companies headquartered in New York state that earned revenues of more than $15 billion in 2015 are all located within the New York metropolitan area. All but two are based in New York City; IBM and PepsiCo are based in Westchester County, New York, just north of New York City.

				(sort)			
NYC rank (2015)	State rank (2015)	US rank (2015)	World rank (2014)	Company	Revenues (billions)	Employees (worldwide)	Industry group
1	1	13	41	Verizon Communications	$131.6	177,700	Telecommunications
2	2	23	61	J.P. Morgan Chase & Co.	$101.0	234,598	Commercial banks
3	3	29	86	Citigroup	$88.3	231,000	Commercial banks
(a)	4	31	82	IBM (Armonk, NY)	$82.5	411,798	Information technology services
4	5	40	121	MetLife	$70.0	69,000	Life and health insurance (stock)
(b)	6	44	141	PepsiCo (Purchase, NY)	$63.1	283,000	Food consumer products
5	7	49	152	American International Group	$58.3	66,400	Property and casualty insurance (stock)
6	8	55	211	Pfizer	$48.9	97,900	Pharmaceuticals
7	9	61	297	New York Life Insurance	$45.9	11,463	Life and health insurance (mutual)
8	10	74	278	Goldman Sachs Group	$39.2	36,800	Commercial banks [formerly securities]
9	11	78	306	Morgan Stanley	$37.9	56,218	Commercial banks [formerly securities]
10	12	82	349	TIAA (Teachers Insurance and Annuity Association)	$35.2	12,735	Life and health insurance (mutual)
11	13	83	352	INTL FCStone	$34.7	1,231	Diversified financials
12	14	85	325	American Express	$34.4	54,800	Diversified financials
13	15	96	375	20th Century Studios	$29.0	20,500	Entertainment
14	16	99	415	Time Warner	$28.1	24,800	Entertainment
15	17	105	438	Travelers Companies	$26.8	30,800	Property and casualty insurance (stock)
16	18	106	398	Philip Morris International	$26.8	80,200	Tobacco
17	19	116	–	Time Warner Cable	$23.7	56,430	Telecommunications
18	20	126	495	Alcoa	$22.5	60,000	Metals
19	21	168	–	Bristol-Myers Squibb	$16.6	25,000	Pharmaceuticals
20	22	174	–	Colgate-Palmolive	$16.0	37,900	Household and personal products
21	23	179	–	The Bank of New York Mellon	$15.5	51,200	Commercial banks
22	24	184	–	Icahn Enterprises	$15.3	73,807	Diversified financials
23	25	188	–	Omnicom Group	$15.1	74,900	Advertising, marketing
Sources: Fortune 500 website, Fortune Global 500 website and Fortune, Volume 173, Number 8 (June 15, 2016)

Notes:
(a), (b) : Armonk and Purchase are in Westchester County, New York, outside and to the north of New York City
Ranked by revenues in the fiscal year that ended before February 1, 2016.
The world rank is based on the Fortune Global 500's revenues for the fiscal year that ended before April 1, 2015.

== See also ==
- Economy of Long Island
- Economy of New York State
- Economy of the United States
- New York City Mayor's Office of Management and Budget
