= Grassi & Co. =

American company that specializes in accounting and auditing

- Company type: Private
- Industry: Accounting
- Founded: 1980
- Headquarters: Jericho, New York, United States
- Key people: Louis C. Grassi, CEO/managing partner
- Services: Accounting, auditing, consulting, financial planning
- Net income: $132 Million (2024)
- Number of employees: ~500
- Website: grassiadvisors.com

Grassi & Co. Certified Public Accountants, PC, together with Grassi Advisory Group, Inc., are a pair of independently owned, employee-owned advisory, tax and accounting services companies that operate together and are branded together as Grassi. Their main offices are located in Jericho, New York, and they have additional locations in New York City, Long Island, Westchester, New Jersey, Massachusetts and Florida.

== Background and company size ==
Grassi & Co. was founded in 1980 in New York City. The Grassi companies provide accounting, auditing, tax and consulting services to industries. The firms have eight US offices across New York, New Jersey, Massachusetts and Florida.

In 2013, Grassi was one of the 100 largest accounting firms in the United States, according to Inside Public Accounting and Accounting Today.

At some unidentified point in time, Grassi was identified as the 18th largest accounting firm in the New York metropolitan area by Crain's New York Business and among the ten largest accounting firms on Long Island by Long Island Business News.

== Work environment ==
In 2011, Grassi was included somewhere in the list of "Best Places to Work" published in Crain's New York Business.
