= Hauppauge Union Free School District =

School district in the U.S. state of New York

Location
- Hauppauge, Suffolk County, New York; United States

District information
- Type: Public
- Motto: Learners Today, Leaders Tomorrow
- Grades: PK-12
- Superintendent: Dr. Donald B. Murphy
- Schools: 5

Students and staff
- Students: 3,168
- District mascot: Eagles
- Colors: Blue and white

Other information
- District Offices: 495 Hoffman Lane Hauppauge, NY 11788
- Website: http://hauppauge.k12.ny.us/

Hauppauge Union Free School District is a public school district on Long Island in the towns of Islip and Smithtown of Suffolk County, New York. It serves most of Hauppauge and parts of Smithtown,Commack, and Islandia and is bordered by the Commack School District, Central Islip School District, Smithtown Central School District, Brentwood Union Free School District, and Connetquot School District.

The superintendent of schools is Dr. Donald B. Murphy. The deputy superintendent is Joseph C. Tasman.

The district, as of the 2022-23 school year, has 3,165 K-12 students enrolled.

Hauppauge Union Free School District's offices and Board of Education are found at 495 Hoffman Lane, named "Whiporwil" for the former elementary school that used to occupy the building.

== Schools ==
Hauppauge UFSD contains the following schools:

=== Elementary schools ===
- Bretton Woods Elementary School
- Forest Brook Elementary School
- Pines Elementary School

=== Secondary schools ===
- Hauppauge Middle School
- Hauppauge High School
