= Dottie Herman =

American businesswoman

- Born: Dorothy D'Ambrosio; Brooklyn, New York
- Education: B.A. Adelphi University
- Occupation: businesswoman
- Known for: Vice Chair of real estate brokerage firm Douglas Elliman
- Spouse: Jay Herman
- Children: 1
- Website: dottieherman.com

Dorothy D'Ambrosio, also known as Dottie Herman, serves as Vice Chair of Real Estate brokerage firm Douglas Elliman.

== Early life ==
The daughter of Joseph and Louise D'Ambrosio, Dorothy D'Ambrosio was born in Brooklyn and grew up in Syosset on Long Island. She recalls that she resolved to "make something of herself" after her mother died in an automobile accident when she was 10 years old.

== Career ==
As an entrepreneur from early on, Dorothy D'Ambrosio began working in real estate in 1978 while she was a student at Adelphi University. After beginning and building her career on Long Island, in 1989 she and partner Carll S. Burr III purchased Prudential Long Island Realty. After expanding that company, to one of the largest brokerages on Long Island. In 2003 she purchased Douglas Elliman, where she built and lead Manhattan’s largest brokerage firm, with her partner Howard Lorber. Since then, Douglas Elliman has become the largest and fastest-growing real estate firm in New York. Dottie Herman served as the President of the brokerage firm and as its Chief Operating Officer. In August 2021, Dottie stepped down as the CEO of Douglas Elliman Real Estate and assumed the role of Vice Chair.

=== Douglas Elliman Real Estate ===
Douglas Elliman Douglas Elliman Real Estate under the leadership of Dorothy D'Ambrosio is now the third-largest real estate company in the United States. With a team of 7,000 agents in more than 113 offices throughout New York City as well as the Hamptons, Westchester, Connecticut, New Jersey, Florida, California, Colorado, Massachusetts, and Texas, Douglas Elliman Douglas Elliman Real Estate’s sales volume exceeded $27.4 billion in 2017 with a closing every 19 minutes. Douglas Elliman also controls a portfolio of real estate services including Douglas Elliman Development Marketing, Douglas Elliman Property Management, DE Commercial, and DE Title. Douglas Elliman is a strategic partner with London-based Knight Frank LLP for residential business.

== Awards ==
In June 2016 Forbes named Dottie Herman 'America's Richest Self-Made Woman In Real Estate' and she has twice been named among the 100 most influential women in New York business by Crain’s New York Business.

In August 2015, Dottie Herman earned an Innovator Award from Inman for her contributions as CEO of Douglas Ellliman. She was honored by Adelphi University as the 2007 Outstanding Executive on Long Island.

== Philanthropy ==
She is a longtime supporter of the American Heart Association, the Tilles Center for the Performing Arts, the Southampton Hospital, and the North Shore Long Island Jewish Hospital.

== Personal life ==
Dottie has one daughter Christine who is an educator.
