= HIA-LI =

Grass-roots and pro-active business organization

- Formation: 1978; 48 years ago
- Purpose: Business Advocacy Organization
- Headquarters: 225 Wireless Blvd. #101, Hauppauge, New York, U.S. 11788
- Volunteers: 55,000+
- Website: hia-li.org

HIA-LI (formerly the Hauppauge Industrial Association), which has a membership of approximately 1,000 companies throughout Long Island, is a grass-roots, pro-active business organization. HIA-LI had its start in 1978 due to the constant power outages by the Long Island Lighting Company. The catalyst for the formation of HIA-LI was that communications with LILCO was poor at best.

HIA-LI focuses on the economic health and well-being of its member companies and that of the entire Long Island business community. HIA-LI provides services and programs focusing on international trade, human resources, business development, government affairs, manufacturing, technology, environment, education, engineering, transportation, and energy.

HIA-LI offers many networking opportunities at monthly luncheons, educational seminars, trade shows, golf outings, fishing and ski trips, holiday parties, etc. In addition, HIA-LI successfully spearheaded an effort to have New York State construct an exit into the industrial park in Hauppauge where more than 60% of its members are located, from Northern State Parkway. This exit is used daily by hundreds of business people. It works closely with town, county and state government agencies and departments, to help ensure the safety, health, ease of transportation, and general business assistance for the 1,300 companies and 55,000 employees in the Long Island Innovation Park at Hauppauge, formerly the Hauppauge Industrial Park.

HIA-LI hosts an annual Business Achievement Awards event where they review and nominate the most successful companies and organizations in Long Island. Past winners and finalists include: Allstate Insurance, Amneal Pharmaceuticals, Community Development Corp., American Heart Association, EAC, Inc., Fuoco Group, Grassi & Co., H2M, Island Pro Digital, Then Kensington Company, mindSHIFT Technologies, Habitat for Humanity of Long Island, Middle Country Public Library, Stalco Construction, United Way of Long Island, VAI, Inc. and many others.

HIA-LI has successfully lobbied for the installation of much-needed traffic lights, the repaving or widening of critical roads, stop signs, street lights, bicycle lanes and a state-of-the-art daycare center. It has arranged for the placement of a Suffolk County Police Department COPE medical emergency vehicle in the Industrial Park and recent approval by the Suffolk County Legislature to assign a larger vehicle equipped with advanced life-saving equipment.

Scholarships for Long Island students attending colleges or trade schools on Long Island are presented annually by HIA-LI.
