= Hauppauge High School =

Coordinates: 40°49′20″N 73°12′04″W

Location
- 500 Lincoln Boulevard; Hauppauge, New York; United States

Information
- Type: Public
- Established: 1965
- School district: Hauppauge Union Free School District
- Principal: Joseph Wieckhorst
- Teaching staff: 110.14 (FTE)
- Grades: 9–12
- Enrollment: 1,038 (2024-2025)
- Student to teacher ratio: 9.42
- Colors: Blue and White
- Mascot: Eagle
- Yearbook: Aquila
- Website: https://www.hauppauge.k12.ny.us/o/hhs

Hauppauge High School is a public high school and part of the Hauppauge Union Free School District located in Hauppauge, Suffolk County, Long Island, in the U.S. state of New York.

== Academics ==
Hauppauge High School was named the 373rd-top U.S. high school of 2008 by Newsweek magazine, which placed it seventh among schools ranked in Suffolk County, and in the top 10% of U.S. schools. Hauppauge has a high number of students enrolled in Advanced Placement (AP) courses, of which eighteen are offered:

- Department of Social Studies: World History, United States History, United States Government and Politics
- Department of Science: Biology, Physics 1, Physics C, Chemistry, Environmental Science
- Department of Mathematics: Calculus AB, Statistics
- Department of Languages: French Language and Culture, Spanish Language, German Language and Culture
- Department of English Language Arts: English Literature and Composition, English Language and Composition
- Department of Music: Music Theory
- Department of Art: Art History, Studio Art

Hauppauge High School is also home to the studio produced news magazine show "Eagle Watch." The show, which originated on local public access cable, airs on the show's YouTube channel. More than 130 episodes have been produced since its inception.

== Notable alumni ==
- Nick Fanti (Class of 2015) – Baseball player
- Lori Loughlin (Class of 1982) – Actress
- Bobby Graziose (Class of 1980) – Music Producerand 2x Grammy nominee
- Tom Postilio (Class of 1988) – Real estate broker, Star of HGTV’s Selling New York, Singer
- Gary Flood (Class of 2003) – Soccer player
- Vince Giordano (Class of 1970) – Leader of the famous jazz group, Vince Giordano & the Nighthawks
- Gary Berntsen (Class of 1975) – Central Intelligence Agency (CIA) career officer. Author, Jawbreaker: The attack on bin Laden and al-Qaeda: A personal account by the CIA's key field commander.
- Val James (Class of 1975) – First American-born, African-American, professional ice hockey player in the NHL.
- Michael Fitzpatrick (Class of 1975) – NYS Assemblyman
