= CORE (real estate) =

American real estate brokerage firm

- Industry: Real estate
- Founded: 2005
- Founder: Jack Cayre
- Website: www.corenyc.com

CORE, sometimes referred to as the CORE Group Marketing LLC, is a New York-based, full-service real estate brokerage firm.

== History ==
CORE was founded in 2005 by Jack Cayre (the son of real estate developer and music and video executive Joseph Cayre) and South African immigrant Shaun Osher. The name is an acronym for Cayre Osher Real Estate. It has offices in Chelsea, Flatiron, Union Square, Madison Avenue and Brooklyn.

In March 2010 The Real Deal announced CORE’s participation in the HGTV reality show, Selling New York.

In 2014 Related Companies acquired a stake in CORE.
