= Hauppauge, New York =

- Hamlet and census-designated place
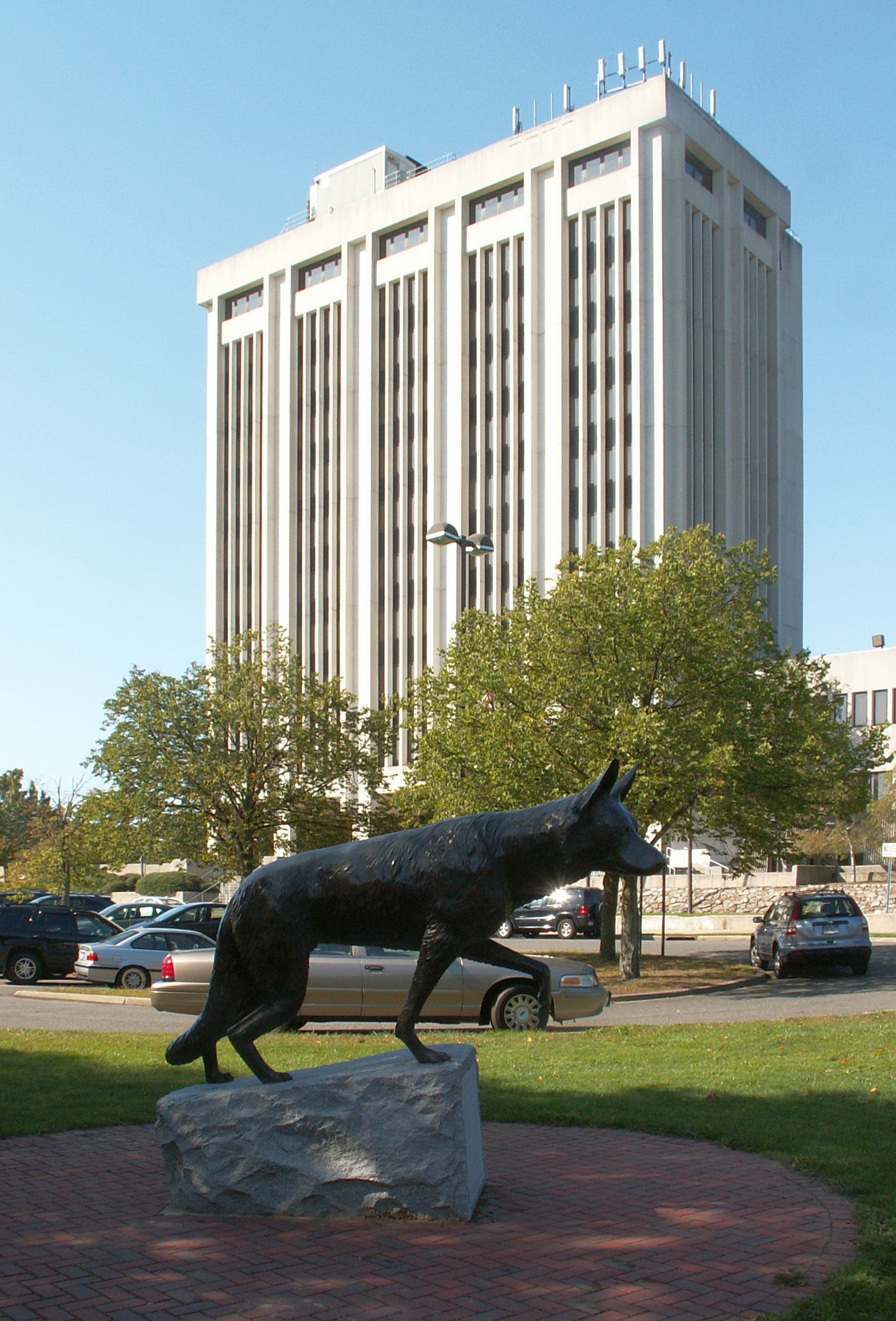
- H. Lee Dennison Suffolk County Executive Building with a monument to war dogs
- Motto: "The Land of Sweet Waters"
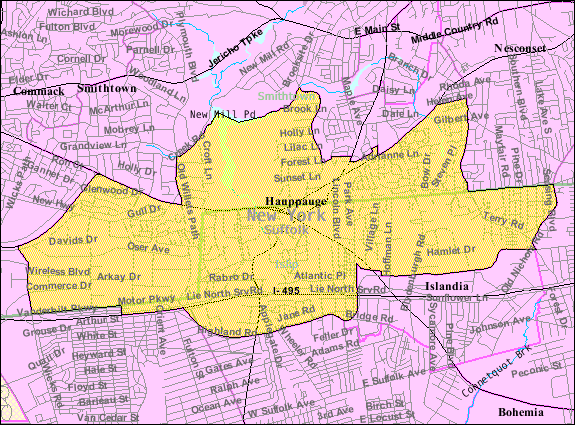
- U.S. Census map

- Location on Long Island Location within the state of New York
- Coordinates: 40°49′6″N 73°12′25″W
- Country: United States
- State: New York
- County: Suffolk
- Towns: Islip, Smithtown

Area
  - Total: 10.29 sq mi (26.66 km^{2})
  - Land: 10.20 sq mi (26.43 km^{2})
  - Water: 0.089 sq mi (0.23 km^{2})
- Elevation: 62 ft (19 m)

Population (2022)
  - Total: 20,083
  - Density: 1,967.7/sq mi (759.75/km^{2})
- Time zone: UTC−5 (Eastern (EST))
  - Summer (DST): UTC−4 (EDT)
- ZIP Codes: 11749, 11760, 11788
- Area codes: 631, 934
- FIPS code: 36-32732
- GNIS feature ID: 0952381

Hauppauge (/ˈhɔːpɒɡ/ HAW-pog) is a hamlet and census-designated place (CDP) in the towns of Islip and Smithtown in western Suffolk County, New York, on Long Island. The population was 20,803 at the time of the 2020 census.

Despite the official county seat of Suffolk County being Riverhead, situated further east, many of the county's government offices are located in Hauppauge.

== History ==
The first house in greater Hauppauge, according to historian Simeon Wood, dates as far back as 1731, located on what would be the Arbuckle Estate, and later the southeast corner of the Hauppauge Industrial Park, near the intersection of Motor Parkway and Old Willets Path. The settlement of Hauppauge proper commenced with the family of Thomas Wheeler prior to 1753, at the present-day location of the BP gas station between Townline and Wheeler Road. The locale would take the Wheelers' name as its own until the 1860s when the name Hauppauge was restored. On March 13, 1806, "a meeting of the male members of the Methodist Society of the 'Haupogues' was convened at the School House agreeable to public notice for the express purpose of Incorporating and Electing Trustees for said Society." The first trustees elected at the meeting presided by Timothy Wheeler and Issac Wheeler were Issac Nichols, Elkanah Wheeler, George Wheeler, and Samuel Brush. They were known as the "Trustees of the Methodist Episcopal Church and Congregation of the Haupogues". In 1812, the Hauppauge Methodist Church that stands today was constructed on land donated by the Wheeler family.

Hauppauge gained significance as a waypoint on the King's Highway, laid out by the colonial legislature of New York in 1702. The present-day right of way departs westward from Route 111 as Conklin's Road or Half Mile Road, passing St. Thomas More Roman Catholic Church before terminating at the border between Smithtown and Islip. Hauppauge was effectively split between the towns of Smithtown and Islip in 1798 with the survey of New Highway, or what is now known as Townline Road (County Route 76).

=== Etymology ===
Hauppauge's name is derived from an Algonquin term for "sweet waters." Local Native American tribes would get their fresh drinking water from this area, instead of near Lake Ronkonkoma where the water was not potable.

== Geography ==
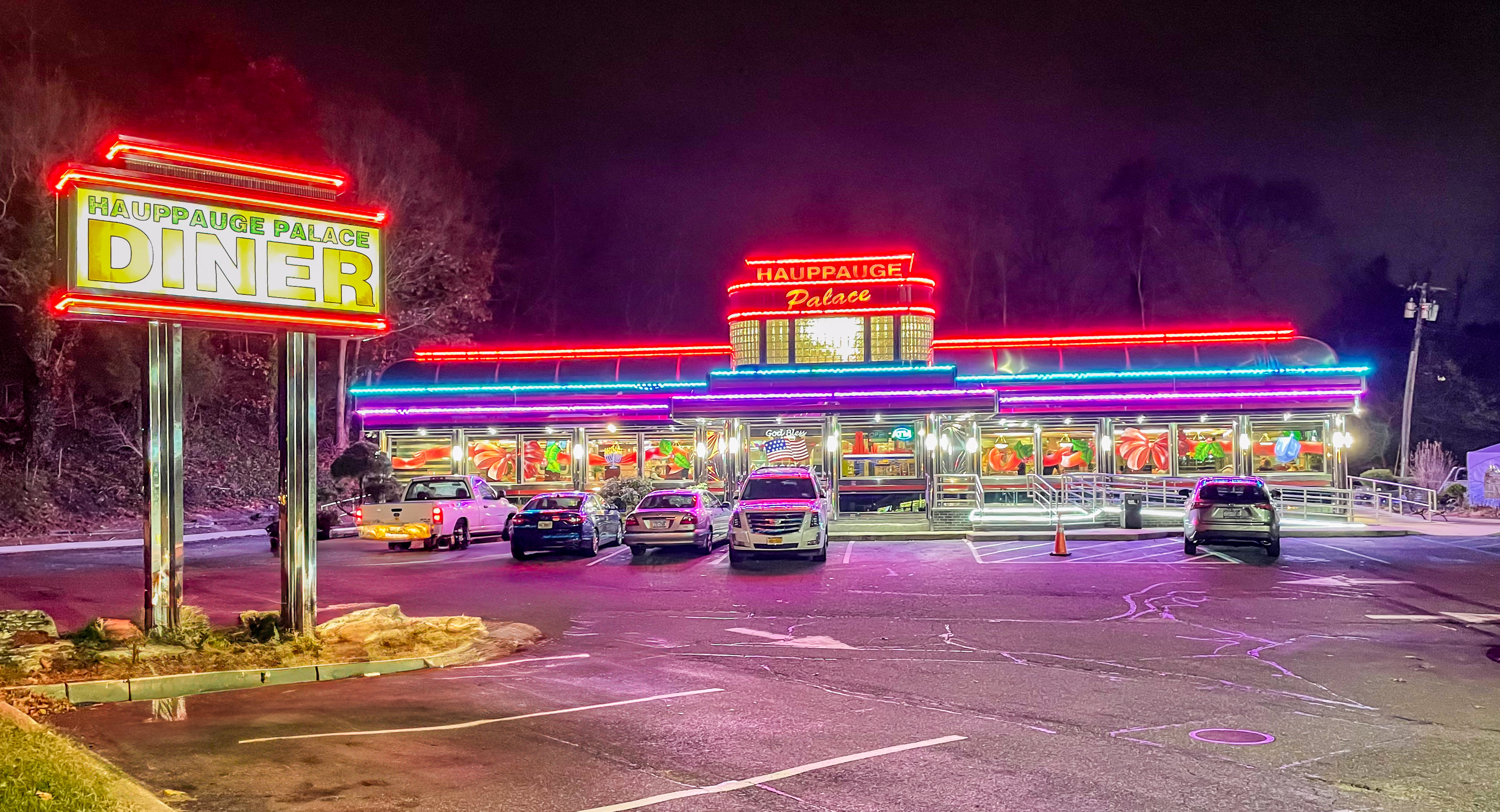
Hauppauge Palace Diner, on Smithtown Bypass

According to the United States Census Bureau, the CDP has a total area of 10.8 square miles (28.1 km^{2}), of which 10.7 square miles (27.7 km^{2}) is land and 0.15 square miles (0.4 km^{2}), or 1.37%, is water.

Hauppauge is known for its underground water springs and high underground water table.

The Nissequogue River runs through the CDP.

=== Climate ===
Hauppauge has a humid subtropical climate (Cfa), and the hardiness zone is 7b.

== Demographics ==
Historical population
Census	Pop.	Note	%±
2000	20,100		—
2010	20,882		3.9%
2020	20,083		−3.8%
2022 (est.)	20,401	▲	1.6%
U.S. decennial census

=== 2020 census ===
As of the 2020 census, Hauppauge had a population of 20,083. The median age was 44.8 years. 19.5% of residents were under the age of 18 and 19.7% of residents were 65 years of age or older. For every 100 females there were 94.8 males, and for every 100 females age 18 and over there were 92.2 males age 18 and over.

100.0% of residents lived in urban areas, while 0.0% lived in rural areas.

There were 7,180 households in Hauppauge, of which 30.6% had children under the age of 18 living in them. Of all households, 60.7% were married-couple households, 12.6% were households with a male householder and no spouse or partner present, and 21.8% were households with a female householder and no spouse or partner present. About 19.9% of all households were made up of individuals and 9.9% had someone living alone who was 65 years of age or older.

There were 7,384 housing units, of which 2.8% were vacant. The homeowner vacancy rate was 0.8% and the rental vacancy rate was 4.1%.

Racial composition as of the 2020 census
Race	Number	Percent
White	15,944	79.4%
Black or African American	546	2.7%
American Indian and Alaska Native	30	0.1%
Asian	1,497	7.5%
Native Hawaiian and Other Pacific Islander	1	0.0%
Some other race	694	3.5%
Two or more races	1,371	6.8%
Hispanic or Latino (of any race)	2,080	10.4%

=== 2020 American Community Survey ===
According to the 2020 American Community Survey 5-year estimates, the median income for a household in the CDP was $120,442, and the mean income was $144,898. On average, people paid a median of $26,868 in annual housing costs. About 4.4% of the population were below the individual poverty line, including 2.9% of families and 8.3% of nonfamily households.

=== 2022 estimates ===
As of the 2022 census estimates, there were 20,401 residents, including 6,830 households and 5,246 families, living in the CDP. The population density was 1,967.8 inhabitants per square mile (759.8/km^{2}). There were 7,384 housing units at an average density of 683.7 per square mile (264.0/km^{2}).

There were 6,830 households, out of which 28.3% had children under the age of 18 living within (a decrease of 8.5 percentage points from the 2010 census), 61.7% were married couples living together, 18.1% had a female householder with no husband present, with an average of 2.90 people per household. 5.7% had someone living alone who was 65 years of age or older. The average family size was 3.39 people.

The median age was 51.3 years, an increase of 10.2 years from the 2010 census. For every 100 females, there were 100.01 males. An estimated 94.7% of the CDP's population holds a high school diploma or higher.

== Economy ==
Royal Apparel's headquarters have been located in Hauppauge since 1992, producing American-made apparel here, in addition to several other locations along the U.S. East Coast. In May 2000, Skidmore, Owings & Merrill opened an office in Hauppauge. The 2,500-square-foot (230 m^{2}) office is located on the second floor of the 1300 Veterans Memorial Highway building. Carl Galioto, the head of the company's technical division, stated that it opened the office because it had difficulty hiring New York City-area recruits. The location was established to attract professionals who would have otherwise been required to commute. Dime Community Bank is headquartered in Hauppauge, and Voxx International – a consumer electronics company – has offices in the hamlet.

=== Long Island Innovation Park at Hauppauge ===
The Long Island Innovation Park at Hauppauge (formerly the Hauppauge Industrial Park), located at the edge of the hamlet, is the largest on Long Island, and by some accounts the second-largest industrial park in the United States. It is also reported to be the largest of its kind in the United States that is fully protected by an all volunteer fire department, the Hauppauge Fire Department. The park had more than 1,000 companies as of 2017 and employs over 55,000 people. The companies in the industrial park provide tax revenue to the Hauppauge school district's budget. The current site of the Long Island Innovation Park at Hauppauge housed a radio communication facility operated first by Mackay Radio and Telegraph Company in 1936 (and owned by Clarence Mackay) and later by the ITT Corporation. The radio facility, which specialized in transmissions to and from Europe, South America, and ships at sea, closed in 1986 but is memorialized on-site by Wireless Blvd.

== Notable people ==
- James Hagens, formerly of Boston College and NHL player of the Boston Bruins.
- Bud Harrelson, former Mets player (1969 World Series), coach (1986 World Series), and manager (1990–1991); owner of Long Island Ducks
- Val James, NHL player
- Tom Kirdahy, theatre producer
- Lori Loughlin, actress
- Candice Night, vocalist/lyricist and the wife of hard rock guitarist Ritchie Blackmore
- Eddie Yost, former Washington Senators player and Mets third base coach (1969 World Series)

== Education ==
Hauppauge Union Free School District operates public schools.

- Hauppauge High School
- Hauppauge Middle School
- Bretton Woods Elementary School
- Forest Brook Elementary School
- The Pines Elementary School
- Adelphi University's Hauppauge Center is located at 150 Motor Parkway.

Additionally, the northeastern part of the hamlet is served by the Smithtown Central School District. There is also a part located in the Commack School District, however it is an industrial zone and there are no houses there.

== Media ==
The hyperlocal news website Hauppauge Patch provides daily online coverage of breaking news, sports and community events. Hauppauge is also home to master control facilities for several media organizations, including Thomson Reuters and Paramount Media Networks.

== See also ==
- Abscam
- Hauppauge Computer Works
