= Selling New York =

- Country of origin: United States
- Original language: English
- No. of seasons: 8

Production
- Production locations: New York City, New York, United States
- Running time: 22 minutes

Original release
- Network: HGTV
- Release: April 2010 – present

Selling New York was an American television series airing on HGTV. It featured real estate brokers from three Manhattan real estate companies (Gumley Haft Kleier, CORE, and Warburg) selling real estate to New York's elite. Season 1 was filmed between September 2009 and February 2010. It premiered in March 2010 and concluded in June of the same year.

The series was renewed for a second season for 39 new episodes. It premiered on January 6, 2011. The show ended after its fourth season in 2014.

It is produced by Canadian production company, JV Productions Inc.

The series has inspired Los Angeles and European spin-offs titled Selling LA which premiered October 13, 2011 on HGTV and Selling London.

"HGTV's Selling New York was an instant hit when it aired this spring in the United States".

== Reception ==
The New York Times's Dana Jennings called the television show "a smart biopsy of the city’s upscale residential market. With quick camera cuts and skyscraper-high energy, the series revels in the daily whirlwind of New York."
