= Long Island =

Populous island in southeastern New York State

Native name: Paumanok
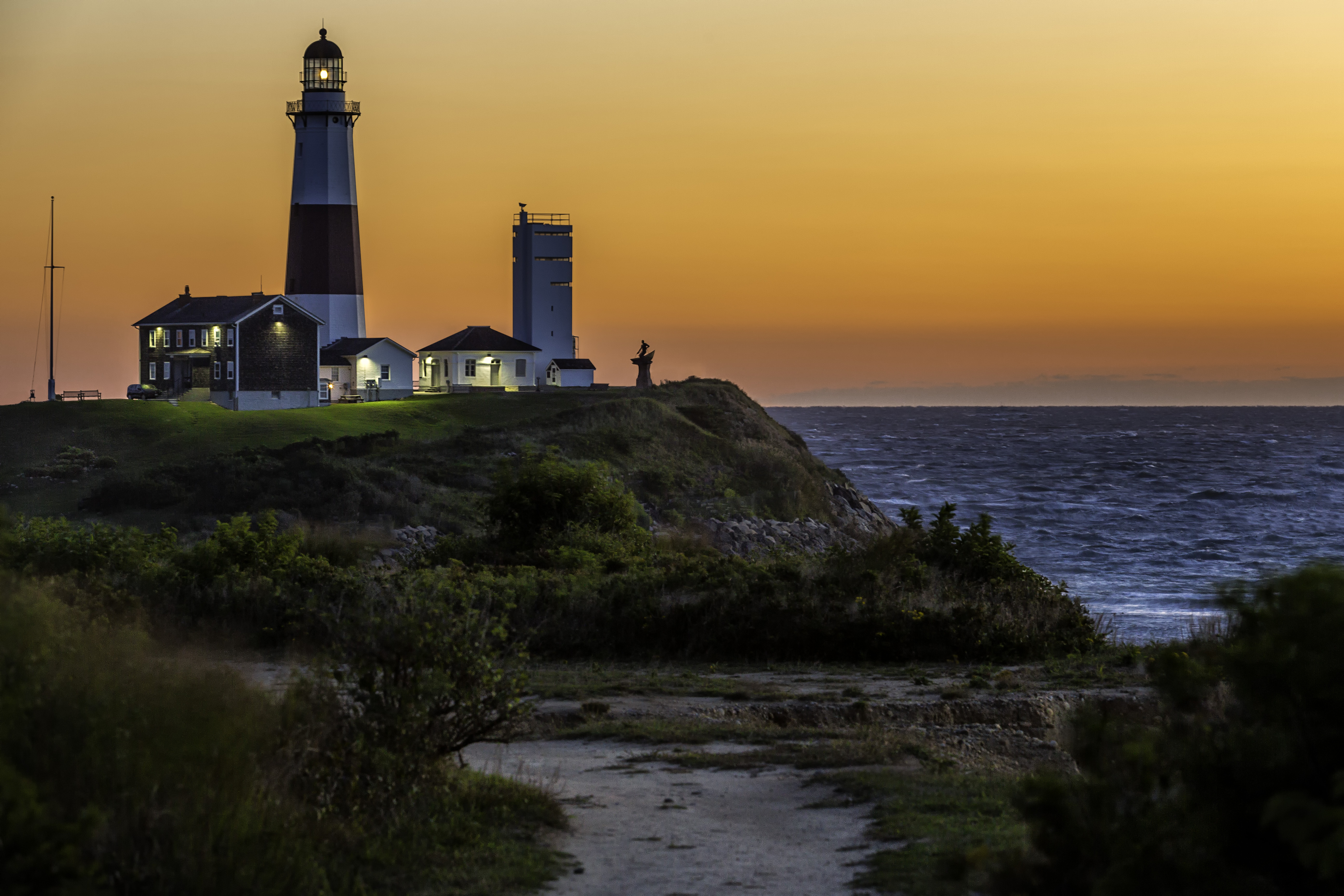
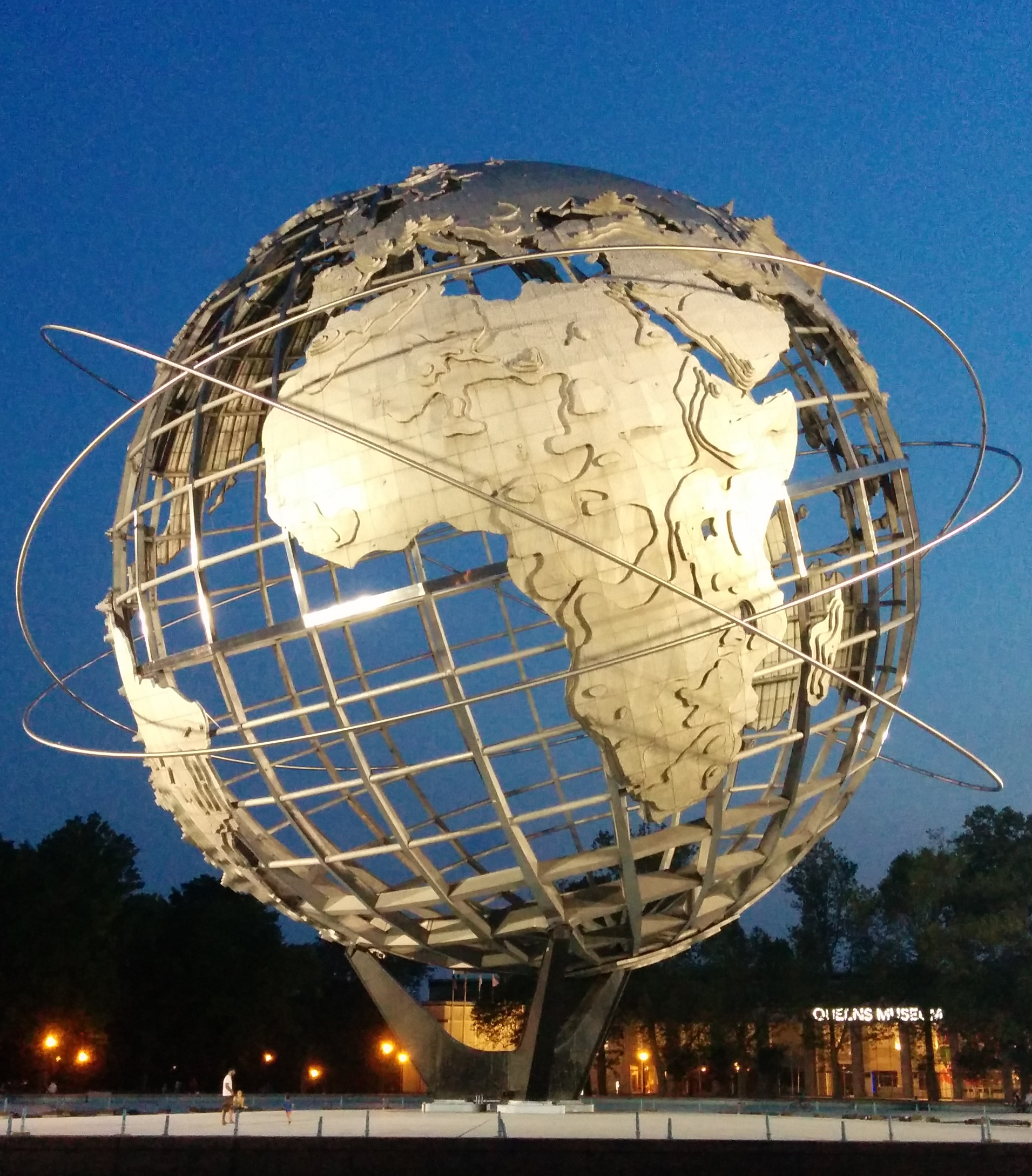
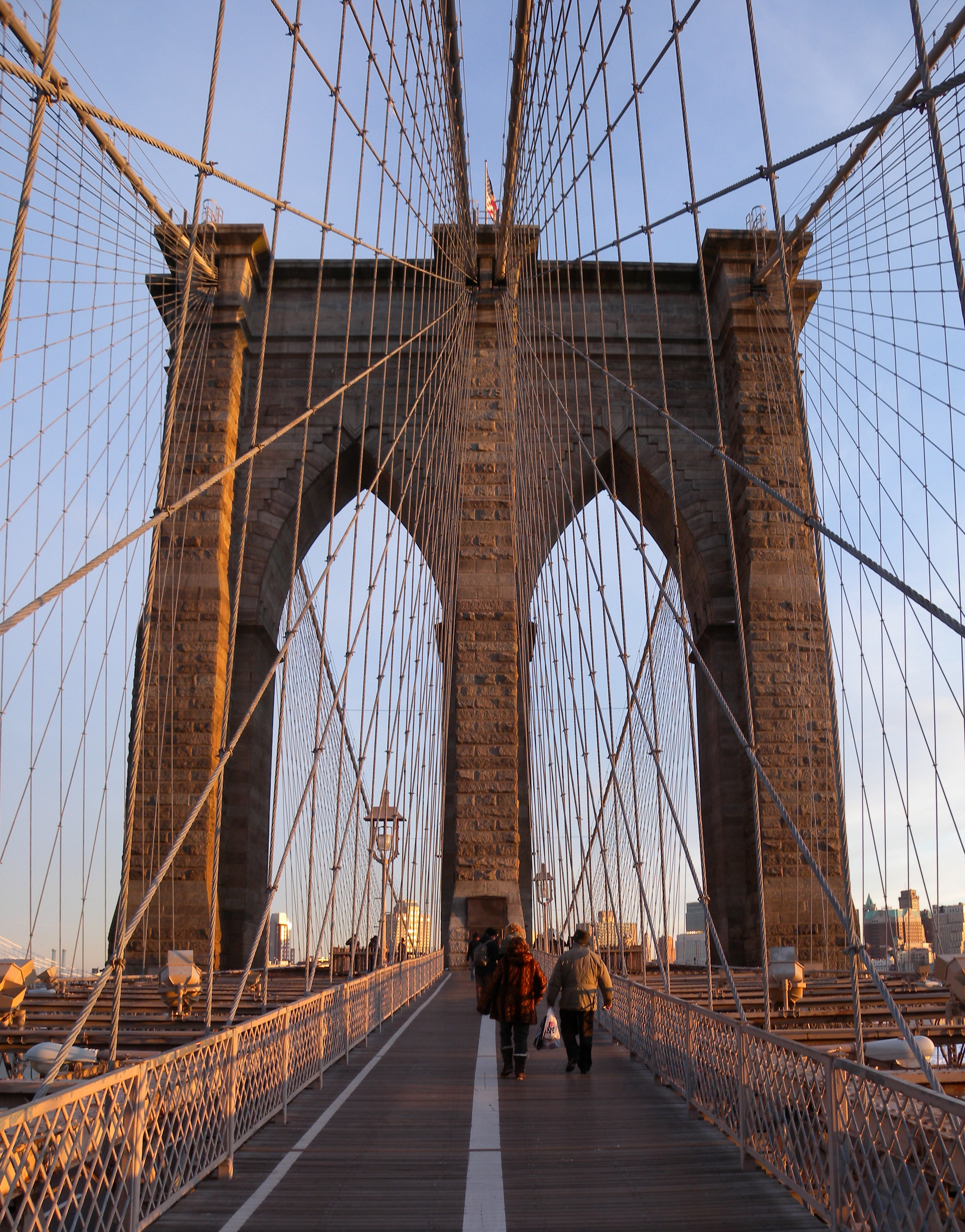
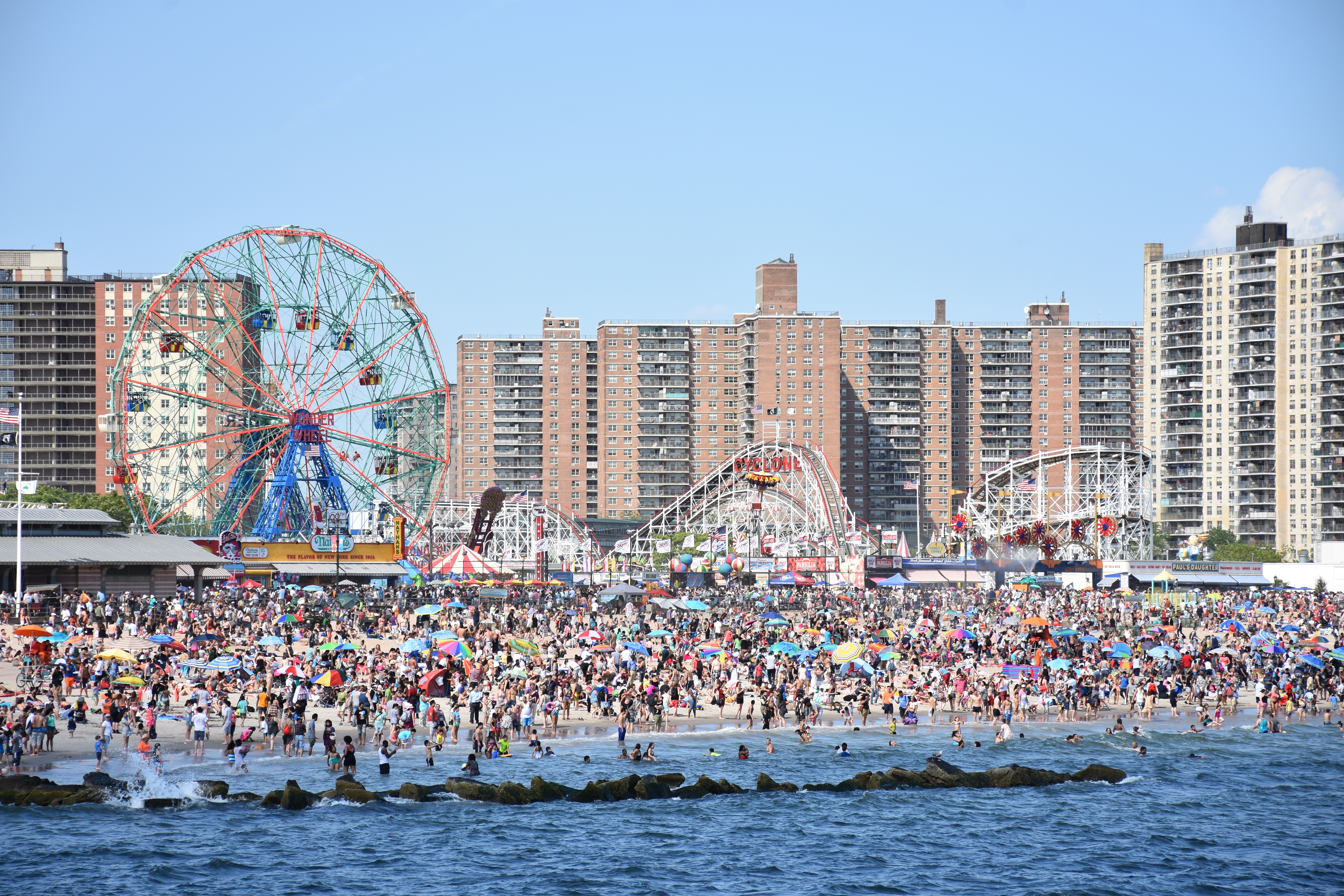
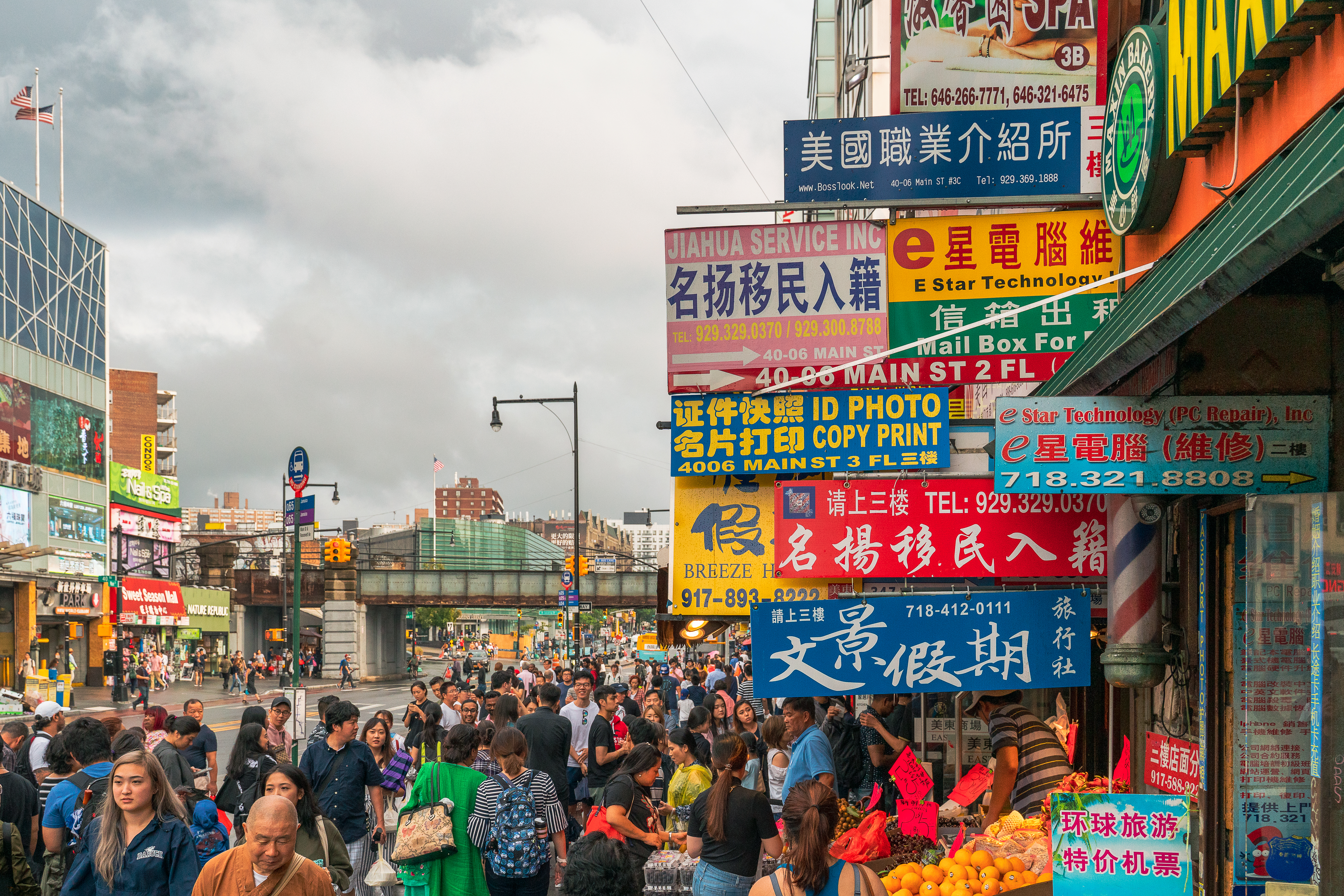
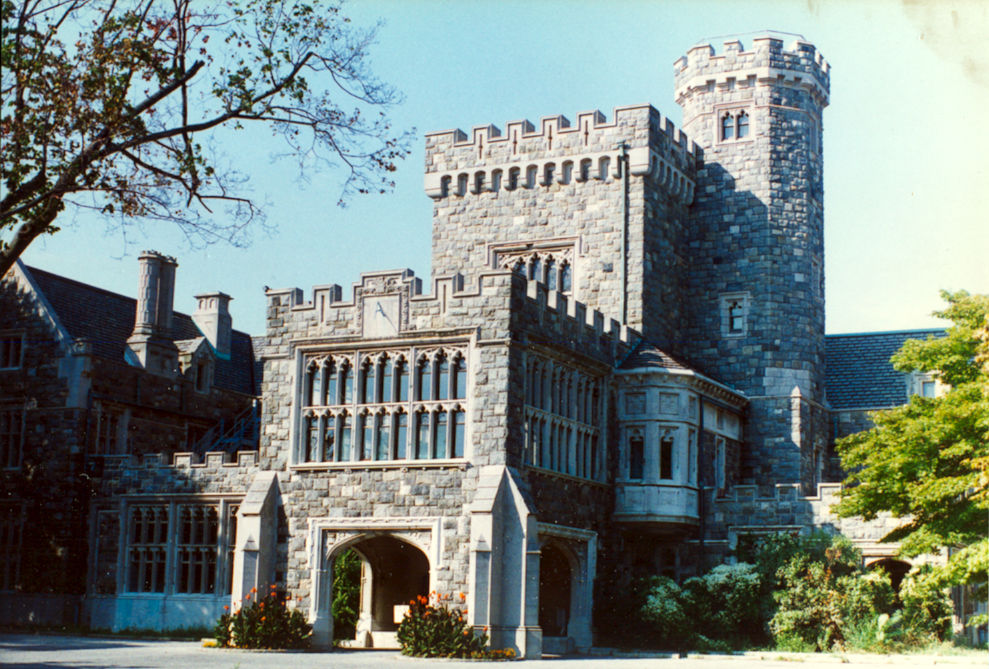
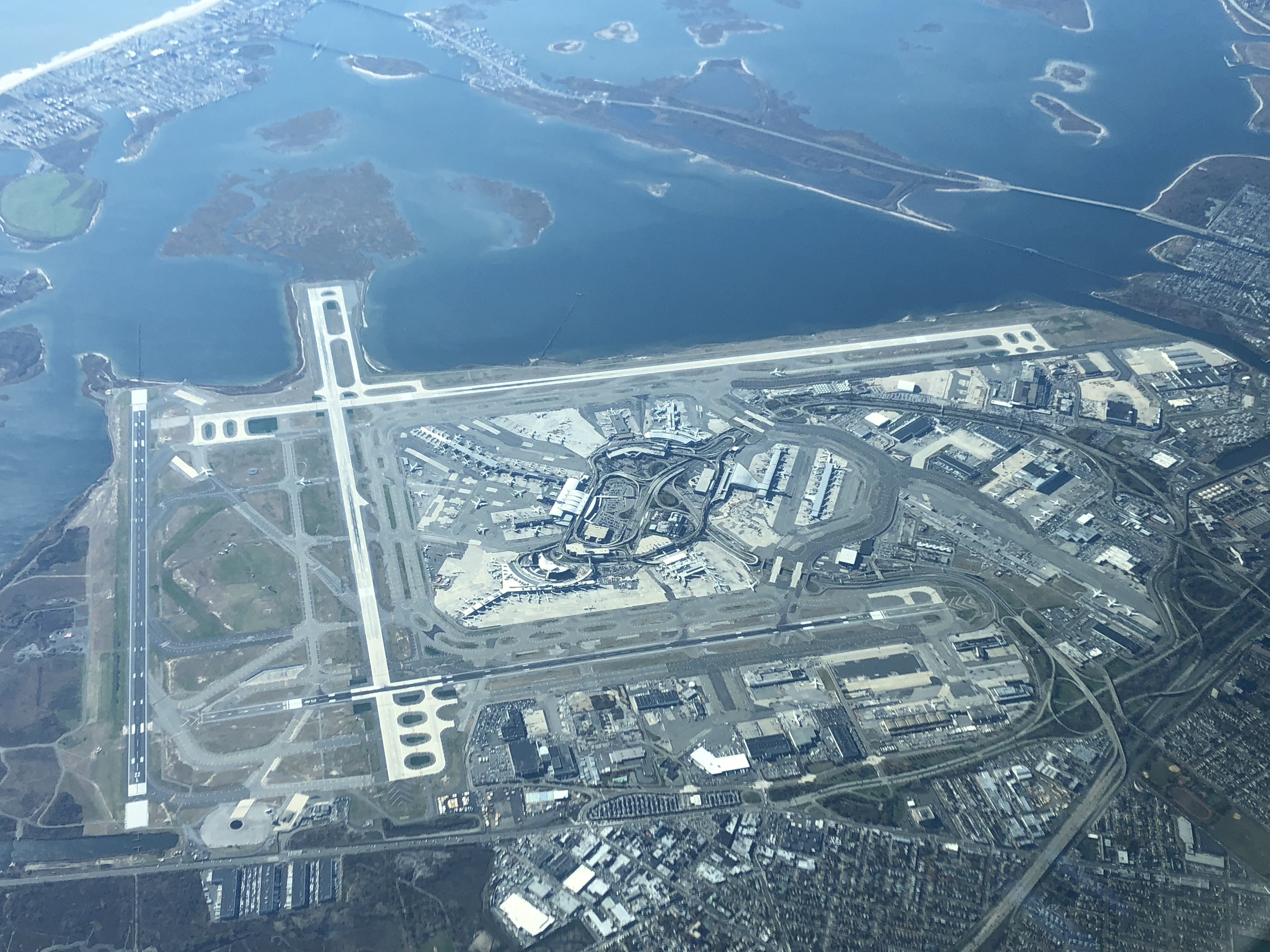
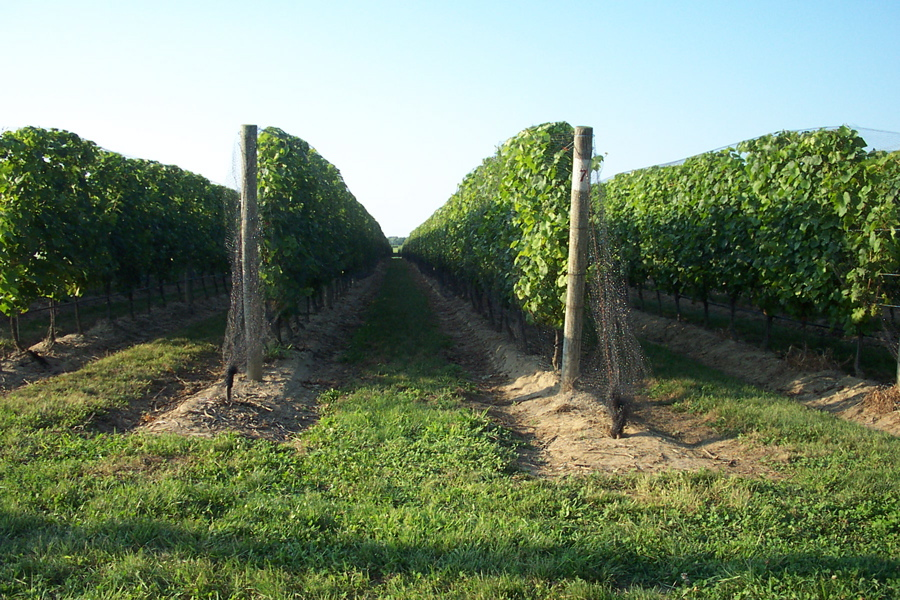
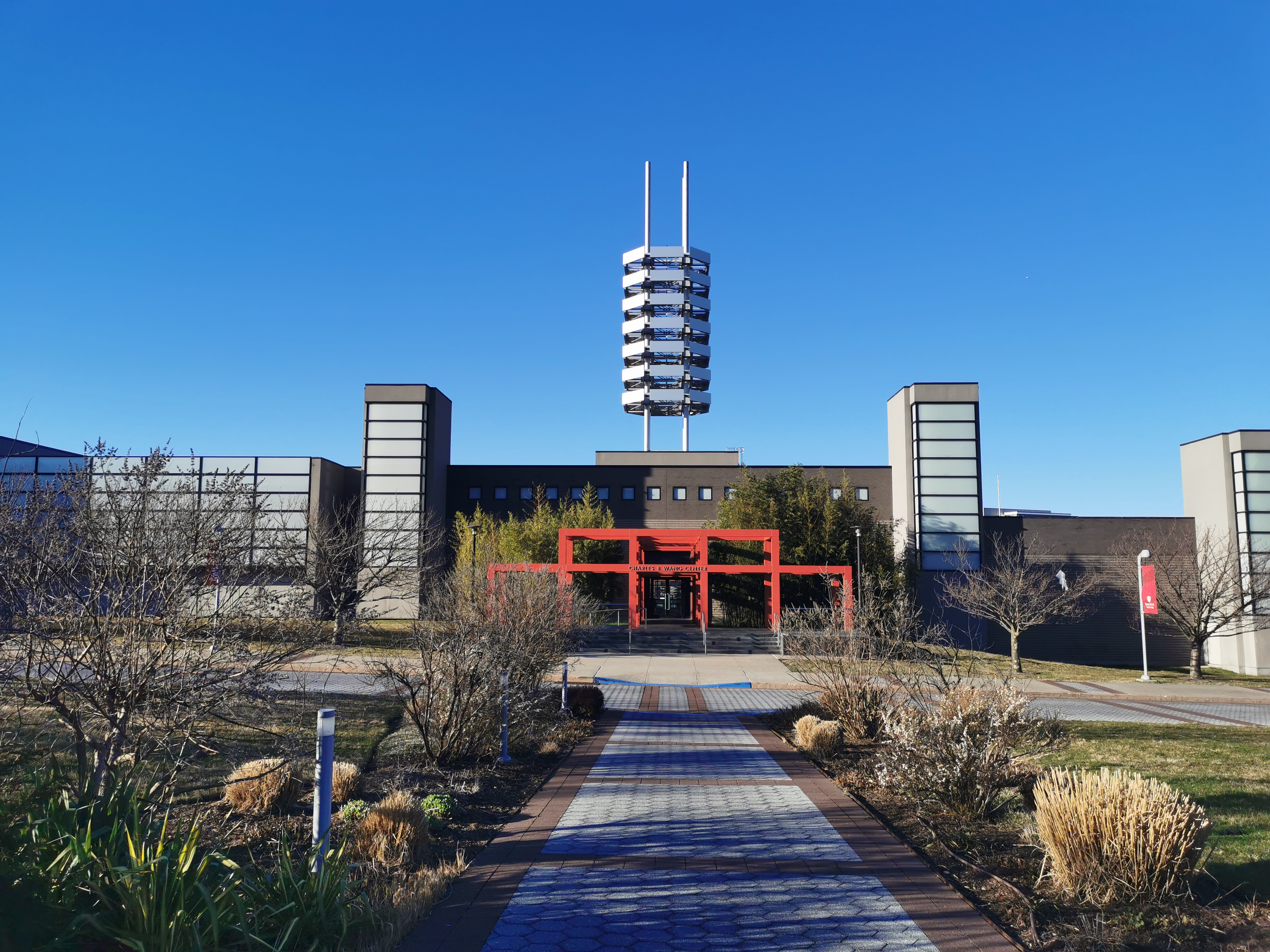
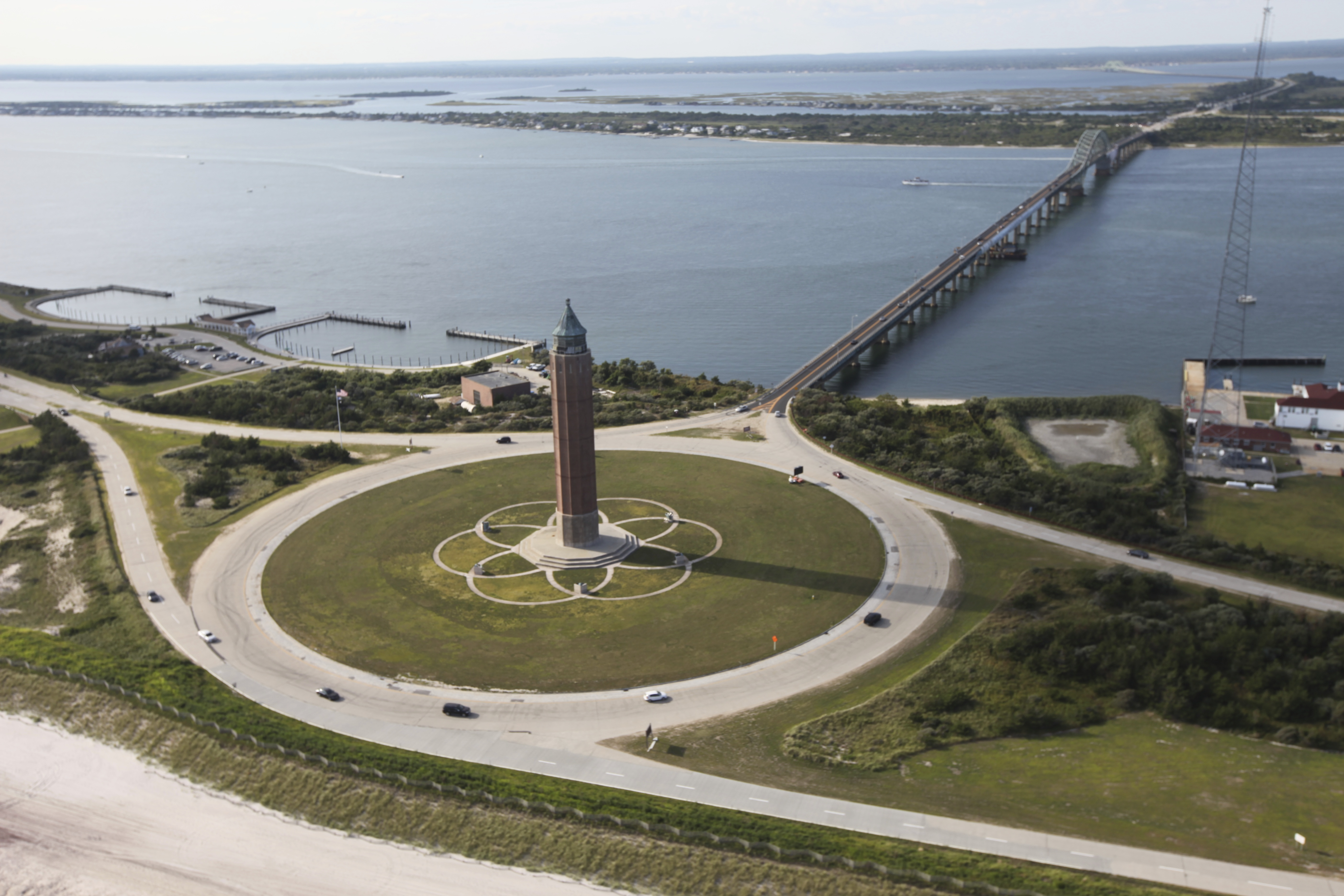
- Montauk Point Light Unisphere Brooklyn Bridge Luna Park, Coney Island Chinatown, Flushing Hempstead House John F. Kennedy International Airport Wine country vineyards Stony Brook University Robert Moses State Park

- Location of Long Island in New York State

- Location of Long Island in the United States

Geography
- Location: Atlantic Ocean
- Coordinates: 40.8°N 73.3°W
- Area: 1,400 sq mi (3,600 km^{2})
- Highest elevation: 401 ft (122.2 m)
- Highest point: Jayne's Hill

Administration
- United States
- State: New York
- Largest settlement: Brooklyn, New York City (pop. 2,653,963)

Demographics
- Demonym: Long Islander; Islander
- Population: 7,957,174 (2025)

Interactive map of Long Island

Long Island is a densely populated island in southeastern New York State, extending eastward into the Atlantic Ocean. Long Island comprises four counties: Kings (Brooklyn), Queens, Nassau, and Suffolk. Kings and Queens counties form the western portion of the island and are boroughs of New York City, while Nassau and Suffolk counties occupy the central and eastern portions respectively.

Long Island extends about 120 miles (190 km) from New York Harbor eastward into the Atlantic Ocean and reaches a maximum width of about 23 miles (37 km). It has a total area of approximately 1,400 square miles (3,600 km^{2}). The island was shaped largely by glacial processes during the Pleistocene, including the formation of terminal moraines and outwash plains.

In common usage, the term Long Island often refers collectively to Nassau and Suffolk counties, excluding Brooklyn and Queens because they are part of New York City; geographically, however, Brooklyn and Queens are located on the island.

Long Island is separated from Manhattan Island and the Bronx by the East River tidal estuary in the western part of the island. North of the island is Long Island Sound, across which lie Westchester County, New York, and the state of Connecticut. Across the Block Island Sound to the northeast is the state of Rhode Island. Block Island, which is part of Rhode Island, and numerous smaller islands extend farther into the Atlantic Ocean. To the southwest, Long Island, at Brooklyn, is separated from Staten Island and the state of New Jersey by Upper New York Bay, The Narrows, and Lower New York Bay.

Long Island's southern coast is bordered by a series of barrier beaches and islands separated from the main island by bays and lagoons. Fire Island is the longest of the barrier islands along the south shore and is separated from Long Island by Great South Bay. Other barrier beaches include those associated with Jones Beach Island and Long Beach Barrier Island.

As of July 1, 2025, the four counties comprising Long Island had an estimated combined population of 7,957,174. Kings County had an estimated population of 2,653,963; Queens County, 2,358,182; Nassau County, 1,398,939; and Suffolk County, 1,546,090. The 2020 United States census counted 8,063,232 residents across the four counties.

Long Island is the most populous island in any U.S. state or territory and one of the most populous islands in the world. Its population is concentrated heavily in the western portion, particularly in Brooklyn and Queens, while population density decreases toward eastern Suffolk County. Western Long Island is highly urbanized, while eastern Long Island contains suburban, agricultural, and undeveloped areas.

Long Island is culturally and ethnically diverse, encompassing densely populated urban neighborhoods, suburban communities, agricultural areas, and coastal communities. Housing costs and the availability of housing have been significant issues in Nassau and Suffolk counties as well as in New York City's Long Island boroughs.

As of 2024, Kings, Queens, Nassau, and Suffolk counties collectively had a gross domestic product of approximately US$558 billion. Economic activity on Long Island includes health care, education, professional and technical services, finance, manufacturing, retail, construction, transportation, and biotechnology. Biotechnology and scientific research play a significant role in the regional economy, with major research and educational institutions including Brookhaven National Laboratory, Cold Spring Harbor Laboratory, Stony Brook University, New York Institute of Technology, the Zucker School of Medicine, and the Feinstein Institutes for Medical Research.

The New York metropolitan area is served by several major airports located on Long Island. John F. Kennedy International Airport and LaGuardia Airport are located in Queens, while Long Island MacArthur Airport is located in Suffolk County. The region is also served by major air traffic control facilities, including New York TRACON and New York ARTCC.

Long Island has numerous bridges and tunnels connecting its communities with New York City's other boroughs and with the mainland. Ferries connect communities in Suffolk County with locations across Long Island Sound, including Connecticut, and with other points around the region.

The Long Island Rail Road (LIRR) is the largest and busiest commuter railroad in the United States and the oldest continuously operating commuter railroad in North America. The railroad operates 11 branches and serves more than 120 stations, connecting communities across Long Island with Penn Station and Grand Central Madison in Manhattan.

The Nassau–Suffolk labor market, which covers Nassau and Suffolk counties, had an unemployment rate of 4.0% in August 2026.

== History ==
=== Early history ===
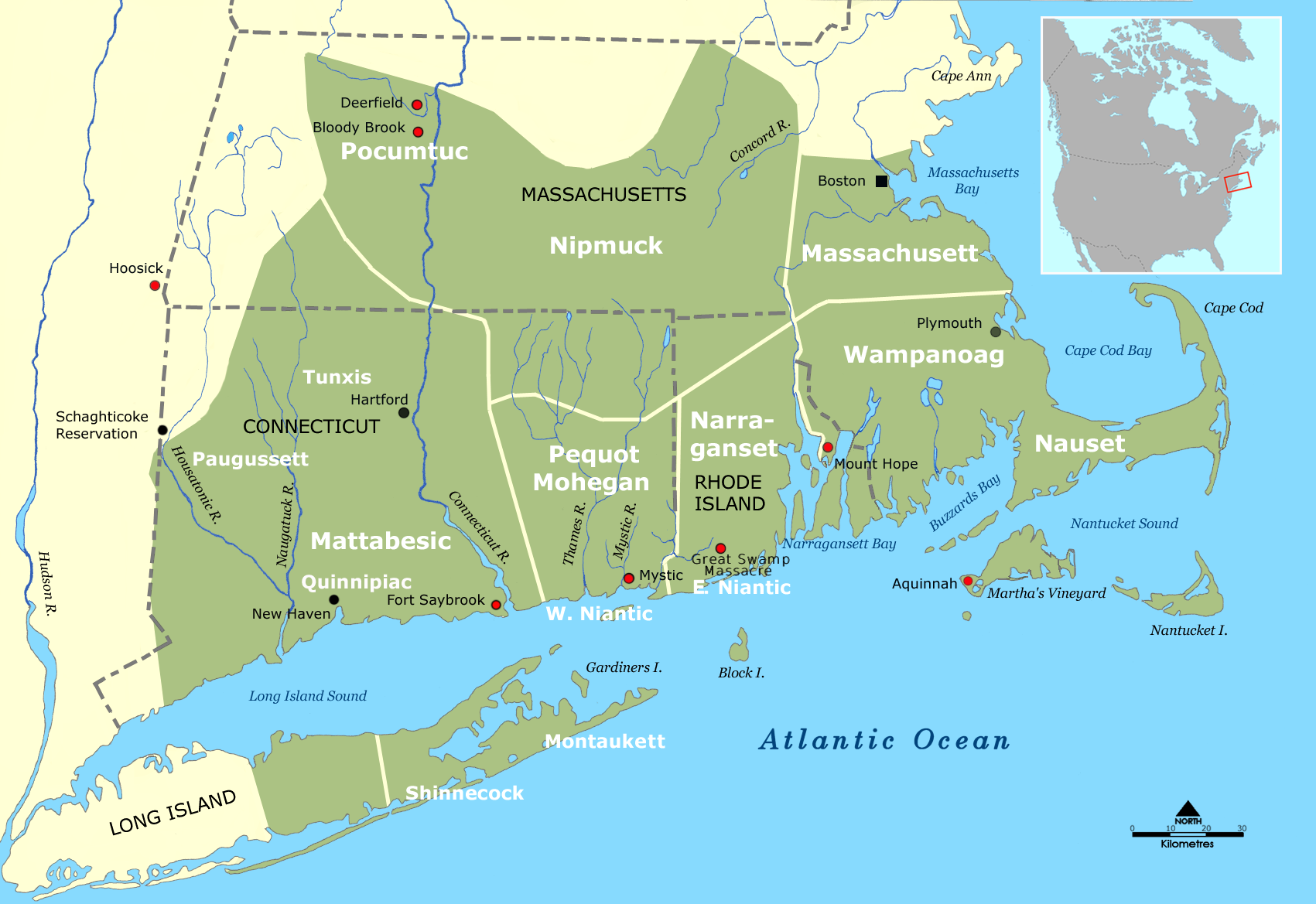
Native American settlements on Long Island in 1600

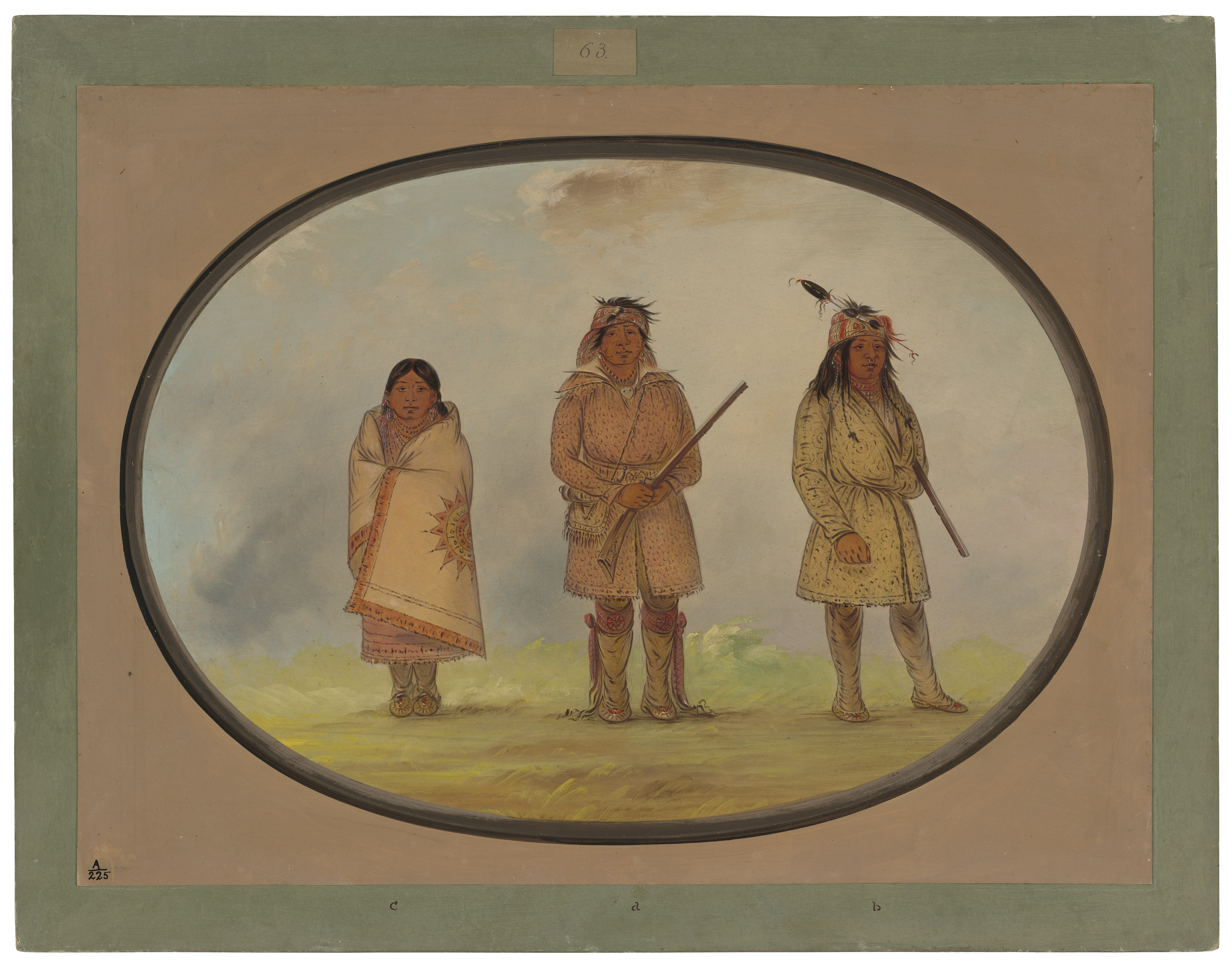
A circa 1860 portrait of three Lenape people

As the last Ice Age waned with Wisconsin glaciation, early Paleo-Indians ventured into the evolving landscapes of present-day Long Island, marking a significant environmental shift and laying the groundwork for the region's rich ecosystems. The nomadic hunter-gatherers, equipped with stone tools, navigated the newly emerging landscapes, hunting large game and gathering from the abundant natural resources.

After the Paleo-Indian period, the Archaic Period marked a broadening of subsistence strategies. The inhabitants of Long Island diversified their diet, exploiting the rich marine and terrestrial environments. The main source of protein came from the sea, consisting of fish and shellfish, with oysters being of particular importance. Deer and other wild game and various plant foods also became part of their regular diet. The archaeological record also reveals a shift towards a more settled lifestyle, with small bands forming seasonal settlements.

The Indigenous peoples in the Early and Middle Woodland period began developing horticulture as well as more efficient strategies for hunting and gathering. They established year-round settlements. Pottery emerged as a widespread technological innovation during this era, serving not only practical storage and cooking purposes but also functioning as a medium for cultural expression. The stylistic variations in pottery across different sites on Long Island suggest a rich diversity of cultural identities and the exchange of ideas among various groups. Additionally, this period was marked by participation in trade networks with other Northeastern Indigenous communities.

During the Late Woodland Period, there was a noticeable intensification of agriculture, with maize becoming a staple crop alongside beans and squash. This agricultural advancement supported larger populations and led to the establishment of more permanent villages characterized by substantial dwellings, mostly wigwams and longhouses. The increased reliance on farming did not eliminate hunting and gathering, which continued to play a crucial role in the subsistence economy.

The Long Island natives lived in villages of differing sizes, and their governing style, because of a lack of evidence, can only be guessed. However, anthropological models suggest that the leaders did not have overarching authority over the rest of the village. Rather, the leaders often sought advice from the elders. The early settlers of Long Island were likely tied by kinship and did not identify themselves as distinct tribes. These tribes were designated by the Europeans as a method of identifying borders. However, there seem to be two overlapping but different cultures. Western Long Island natives probably spoke the Delaware-Munsee dialect. The eastern group's language is less well-founded, but it is most likely related to the southern New England Algonquian dialect. The kinship system likely kept Long Island natives together with clans in present-day New Jersey, Massachusetts, Connecticut, and Rhode Island.

Giovanni da Verrazzano was the first European to record an encounter with the Lenape people, after entering what is now New York Bay in 1524; however, it is unclear whether he encountered Native Americans from Long Island.

=== 17th century ===
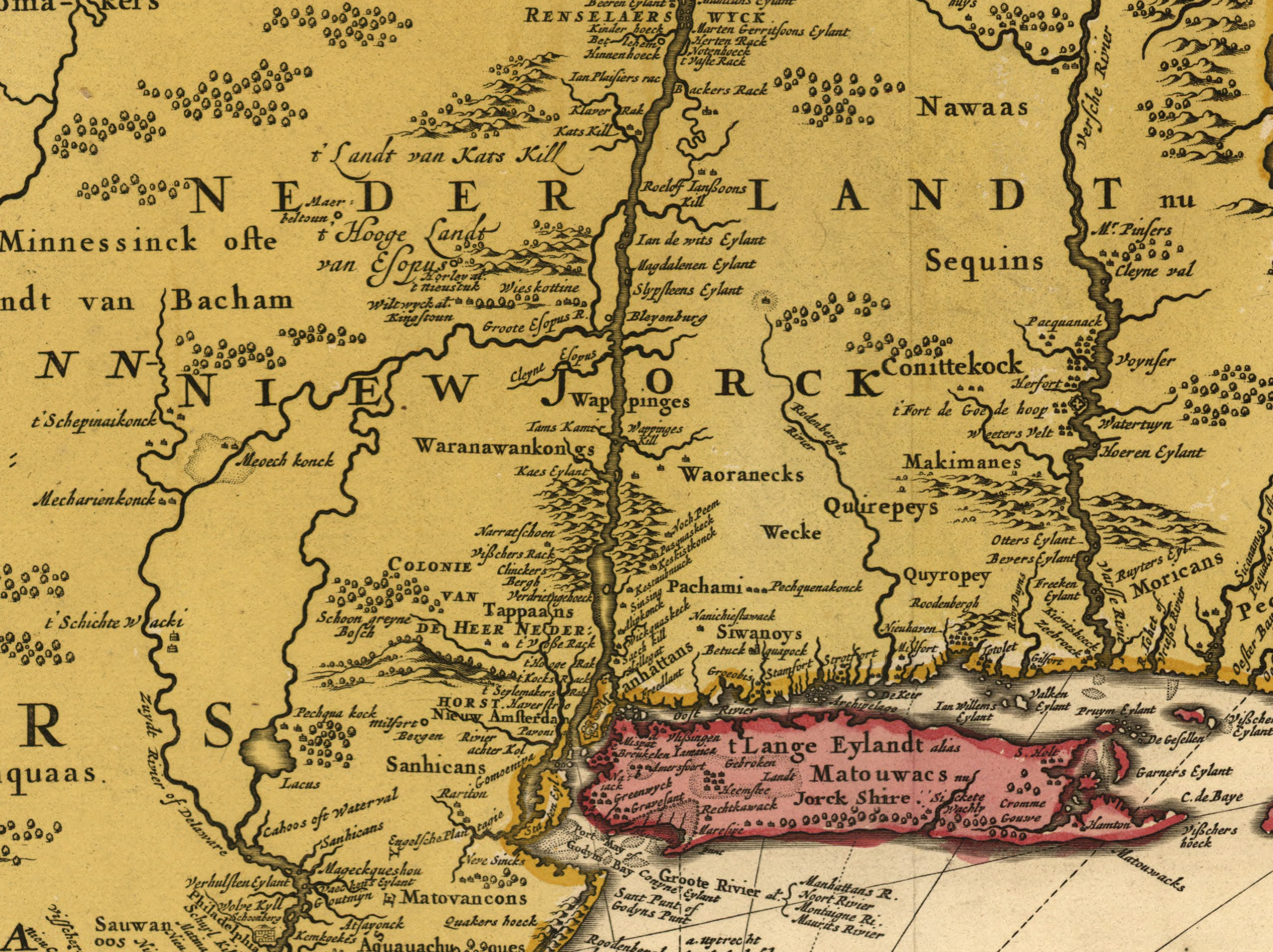
Excerpt from the 1685 Novi Belgii Novæque Angliæ map by Nicolaes Visscher II with "tLange Eylandt alias Matouwacs" in red

In 1609, the English navigator Henry Hudson explored the harbor and purportedly landed at present-day Coney Island. Dutch explorer Adriaen Block followed in 1615 and is credited as the first European to determine that both Manhattan and Long Island are islands.

The first recorded encounters between the Algonquian peoples of Long Island and Europeans occurred with the arrival of explorers in the early 17th century, first contacted by Henry Hudson and his crew. These interactions were initially characterized by curiosity and tentative exchanges, but conflicts later emerged between them. Despite this, mutually beneficial trade ensued, with the Algonquian trading fur for clothing, metal, guns, and alcohol.

The Dutch, recognizing the value of New England's fur market, forged long-term alliances with the Algonquians in 1613, ushering in permanent settlements. By 1621, the Dutch West India Company established itself in the Northeast. The Dutch West India Company established a foothold in the Northeast, initiating a lucrative trade in wampum—beads of significant cultural and economic importance to Native tribes across the Northeast. The wampum was primarily made by Long Island Native Americans. The Dutch would thus engage in a triangular trade: purchasing large quantities of wampum from Long Island, exchanging wampum for fur with inland tribes, and shipping the fur back to Europe. This triangular trade created peace amongst the Europeans and the Native Americans for decades.

In 1636, Charles I of England, a Stuart, rewarded Scottish courtier, diplomat, and colonial governor William Alexander's service to the Crown by creating him Lord Alexander of Tullibody and Viscount of Stirling. On April 22 of that year, Charles told the Plymouth Colony, which had laid claim to Long Island but had not settled it, to cede it to Alexander. When his agent James Farret arrived in New Amsterdam in 1637 to present his claim of English sovereignty, he was arrested and imprisoned in Holland, but later escaped from prison.

The Pequot War, a struggle between the Pequot tribe of Connecticut, who exerted control over eastern Long Island, and the English New England Colonies, reshaped alliances and power dynamics in the region. The defeat of the Pequots left a void in eastern Long Island's political landscape, who were historically under the influence of the Connecticut Pequots for trade and protection. Indigenous leaders such as Uncas and Ninigret, alongside the New England Colonies, vied to fill this vacuum, with the colonists eventually prevailing over their Indigenous rivals. In 1639, Lion Gardiner secured the first purchase of eastern Long Island land, an islet off of present-day East Hampton.

The period between 1636 and 1648 marked a time of land acquisition in Long Island by Dutch and English colonists. The Dutch occupied a small portion of western Long Island while the English settled on the eastern side, buying land from any sachems who were willing to sell to them. The perspectives on these land purchases likely varied significantly between Native Americans and Europeans. Europeans viewed land transactions as opportunities for exclusive ownership and permanent settlement, while the Algonquian peoples viewed the transaction as temporary and communal. Additionally, the Native Americans' governance style of weak leadership and undefined hunting grounds, did not align with the Europeans' need for strict boundaries. This confusion resulted in conflict and boundary disputes for many years after.

In 1640, English colonists attempted to settle Cow Bay in what is present-day Port Washington. After an alert by Native leader Penhawitz, the colonists were arrested by the Dutch but released after saying they were mistaken about the title.

Through Farret, who received Shelter Island and Robins Island, Alexander in turn sold most of the eastern island to the New Haven and Connecticut colonies.

As European settlers proliferated on Long Island, the ecosystem underwent significant transformation, and the dynamics between Native Americans and Europeans shifted. The Europeans cleared vast areas of traditional hunting grounds and introduced livestock that damaged Native crops. Europeans also began to encroach on Native land, and this growing proximity heightened tensions. This culminated in Kieft's War, initiated by a devastating attack that killed 80 Native Americans.

Despite shifting claims to title and absentee land sales, European settlers continued to purchase land directly from Indigenous people. In 1655, they split the acquired land amongst themselves and continued to search the island for more land for settlement. On June 10, 1664, other parts of Indigenous land were bought, including present-day Brookhaven, Bellport, and South Haven, in exchange for four coats and 6 pounds 10 shillings – a value that, accounting for monetary inflation through 2017, is currently worth approximately $840.

During King Philip's War in 1675, the governor of New York, Edmund Andros, ordered that all canoes east of Hell Gate be confiscated. This was done to prevent local Indigenous people from helping their Native allies on the mainland, who were attacking New England settlers there. Notable sachems, such as Tackapousha of the Massapequa, saw their influence wane post-King Philip's War in 1675. In the face of escalating tensions between French and English settlers, these Indigenous figures endeavored to mediate and protect their communities. However efforts to maintain land rights were undermined by disease, deceit, infringements of land patents, and cultural misunderstandings.

After the Dutch began to colonize Manhattan, many Indigenous people moved to Pennsylvania and Delaware. Many of those who stayed behind died from smallpox, which spread to North America via European colonists and resulted in large scale deaths due to lack of antibodies and natural resistance which Eurasian peoples had gained with their exposure to the disease.

Native American land deeds recorded by the Dutch from 1636 state that the Indians referred to Long Island as Sewanhaka. Sewanhacky and Sewanhacking were other spellings in the transliteration of the Lenape. Sewan was one of the terms for wampum, commemorative stringed shell beads, for a while also used as currency by colonists in trades with the Lenape, and is also translated as "loose" or "scattered", which may refer either to the wampum or to Long Island. The name "'t Lange Eylandt alias Matouwacs" appears in Dutch maps from the 1650s, with 't Lange Eylandt translating it to "Long Island" from Old Dutch. The English referred to Long Island as "Nassau Island", after the House of Nassau of the Dutch Prince William of Nassau, Prince of Orange (who later also ruled as King William III of England). It is unclear when the name "Nassau Island" was discontinued. Another Indigenous name from colonial time, Paumanok, comes from the Native American name for Long Island and means "the island that pays tribute."

The very first European settlements on Long Island were by settlers from England and its colonies in present-day New England. Lion Gardiner settled nearby Gardiners Island. The first settlement on the geographic Long Island itself was on October 21, 1640, when Southold was established by the Rev. John Youngs and settlers from New Haven, Connecticut. Peter Hallock, one of the settlers, drew the long straw and was granted the honor to step ashore first. He is considered the first New World settler on Long Island. Southampton was settled in the same year. Hempstead followed in 1644, East Hampton in 1648, Huntington in 1653, Brookhaven in 1655, and Smithtown in 1665.

While the eastern region of Long Island was first settled by the English, the western portion of Long Island was settled by the Dutch; until 1664, the jurisdiction of Long Island was split between the Dutch and English, roughly at the present border between Nassau County and Suffolk County. The Dutch founded six towns in present-day Brooklyn beginning in 1645. These included: Brooklyn, Gravesend, Flatlands, Flatbush, New Utrecht, and Bushwick. The Dutch had granted an English settlement in Hempstead, New York (now in Nassau County) in 1644, but after a boundary dispute, they drove out English settlers from the Oyster Bay area. However, in 1664, the English returned to take over the Dutch colony of New Netherland, including Long Island.

The 1664 land patent granted to the Duke of York included all islands in Long Island Sound. The Duke of York held a grudge against Connecticut, as New Haven had hidden three of the judges (John Dixwell, Edward Whalley and William Goffe) who sentenced the Duke's father, King Charles I, to death in 1649. Settlers throughout Suffolk County pressed to stay part of Connecticut, but Governor Sir Edmund Andros threatened to eliminate the settlers' rights to land if they did not yield, which they did by 1676.

All of Long Island along with islands between Long Island and Connecticut became part of the Province of New York within the Shire of York. Present-day Suffolk County was designated as the East Riding (of Yorkshire), present-day Brooklyn was part of the West Riding, and present-day Queens and Nassau were part of the larger North Riding. In 1683, Yorkshire was dissolved and the three original counties on Long Island were established: Kings, Queens, and Suffolk.

=== 18th century ===
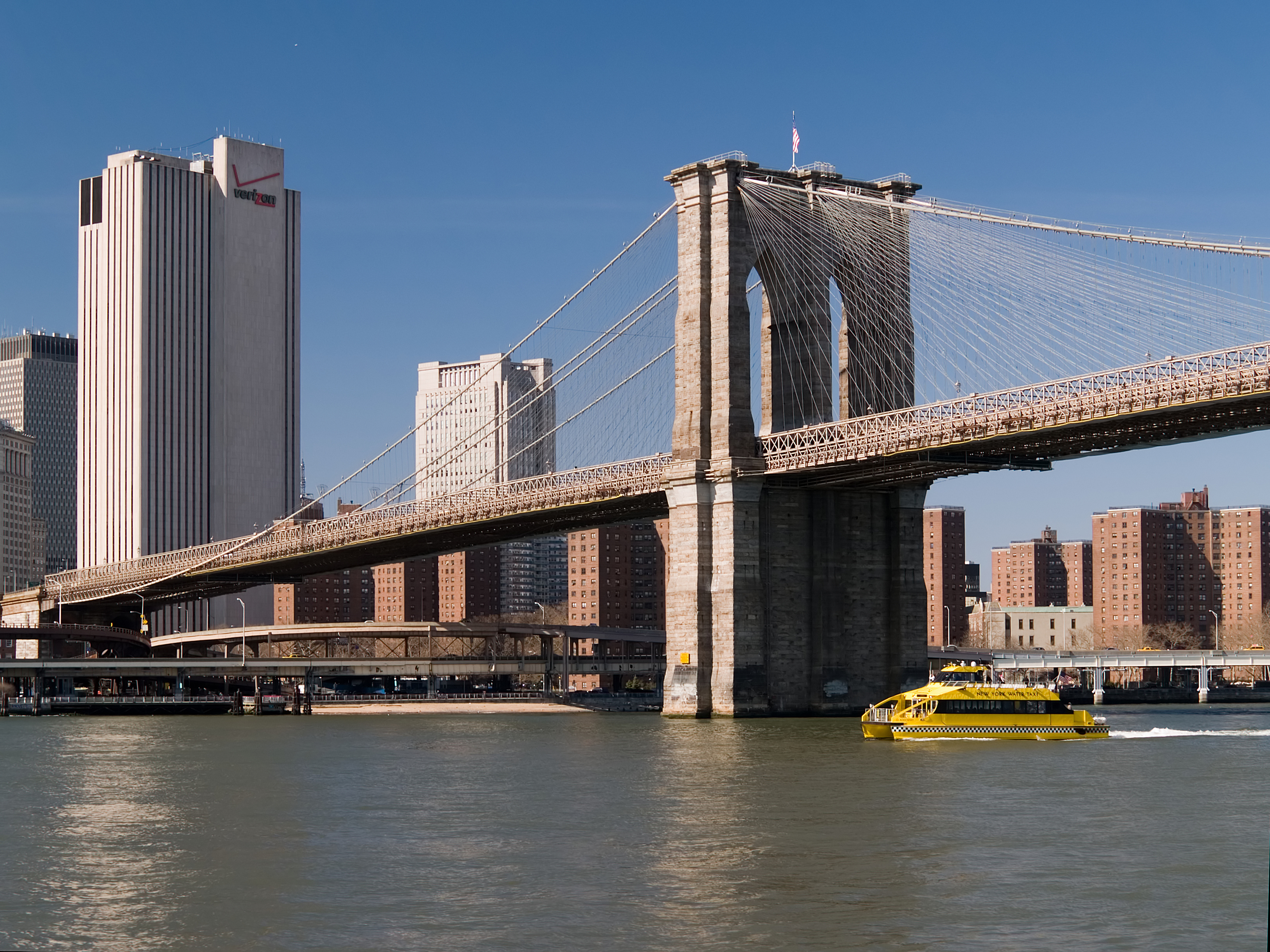
The Brooklyn Bridge, one of several bridges crossing the East River and connecting Long Island with Manhattan

Following the European colonization of the Americas that included Long Island, the Algonquian peoples found themselves increasingly marginalized, their ancient hunting grounds cleared for agriculture, and their economic systems integrated into the European market, particularly through their labor and the dwindling fur and wampum trades. By the 18th century, most native lands had been seized, leaving only small parcels, and many Indigenous people were relegated to roles as domestics, laborers, guides, and seamen. The European colonists also brought slavery to Long Island. By the 1730s, the area had more enslaved people than any other rural or urban area in the northern colonies. The Census of slaves, conducted in the Province of New York in 1755, lists numerous enslaved individuals throughout Long Island's landholdings, communities, and individual households.

William Floyd was born on Long Island on December 17, 1734. In 1654, his family emigrated to North America. By the time of Floyd's birth, the family was established and wealthy. He was a member of the Suffolk County Militia in the beginning of the American Revolution, and rose to the rank of Major General. In 1774, he was chosen as a representative from New York to the First Continental Congress. After the battle of Long Island, his estate was confiscated by the British army and was used as a cavalry base. In 1789, Floyd was elected to the U.S. House of Representatives, where he served until 1791. Francis Lewis from Brookhaven on Long Island, another signer of the Declaration of Independence, had his home destroyed and his wife Elizabeth arrested by the British after the battle of Long Island. George Washington managed her release by having the wives of two wealthy Loyalists from Philadelphia arrested, and then exchanging the two for Mrs. Lewis.

Marinus Willett, of Jamaica, Queens enlisted in the colonial militia after the French and Indian War broke out in 1754. He participated in the Ticonderoga campaign and the capture of Fort Frontenac in 1758. Joining the revolutionary Sons of Liberty in the 1770s, Willett shortly thereafter enlisted in the Continental Army in 1775. Serving in the 1st New York, he took part in the Invasion of Quebec before transferring to the 3rd New York in 1776. Seeing action at Monmouth, Willett then participated in the 1778 Sullivan Campaign. He was made the colonel of the 5th New York in 1780 and the Tryon County militia in 1781, where he fought at Johnstown. On August 22, 1830, Willett died and was buried in the graveyard of Trinity Church. The Willets Point and the accompanying Mets-Willets Point station is named in his honor.

Early in the American Revolutionary War, the island was captured by the British from American troops under George Washington in the battle of Long Island, a major battle after which Washington narrowly evacuated his troops from Brooklyn Heights under a dense fog. After the British victory on Long Island, many Patriots withdrew, leaving mostly Loyalists behind. The island was a British stronghold until the end of the war in 1783.

General Washington based his intelligence activities on Long Island, due to the western part of the island's proximity to the British military headquarters in New York City. The Culper Ring included agents operating between Setauket and Manhattan. This ring alerted Washington to valuable British secrets, including the treason of Benedict Arnold and a plan to use counterfeiting to induce economic sabotage.{}

Long Island's colonists supported both Loyalist and Patriot causes, with many prominent families divided among both sides. During the occupation, British forces utilized a number of civilian structures for defense and were also at times quartered in local homes. A number of structures from this era remain. Among these are Raynham Hall, the Oyster Bay home of patriot spy Robert Townsend, and the Caroline Church in Setauket, which contains bullet holes from a skirmish known as the Battle of Setauket. Also in existence is a reconstruction of Brooklyn's Old Stone House, on the site of the Maryland 400's celebrated last stand during the Battle of Long Island.

=== 19th century ===
In the 19th century, Long Island was still mainly rural and devoted to agriculture. The predecessor to the Long Island Rail Road (LIRR) began service in 1836 from the South Ferry in Brooklyn, through the remainder of Brooklyn, to Jamaica in Queens. The line was completed to the east end of Long Island in 1844, as part of a plan for transportation to Boston. Competing railroads, soon absorbed by the LIRR, were built along the south shore to accommodate travelers from those more populated areas. For the century from 1830 until 1930, total population roughly doubled every twenty years, with more dense development in areas near Manhattan. Several cities were incorporated, such as the "City of Brooklyn" in Kings County, and Long Island City in Queens.

Until completion of the Brooklyn Bridge in 1883, the only means of travel between Long Island and the rest of the United States was by boat or ship. As other bridges and tunnels were constructed, areas of the island began to be developed as residential suburbs, first around the railroads that offered commuting into the city. On January 1, 1898, Kings County and portions of Queens County were consolidated into the City of Greater New York, abolishing all cities and towns within them. The easternmost 280 square miles (730 km^{2}) of Queens County, which were not part of the consolidation plan, separated from Queens in 1899 to form Nassau County.

At the close of the 19th century, wealthy industrialists who made vast fortunes during the Gilded Age began to construct large "baronial" country estates in Nassau County communities along the North Shore of Long Island, favoring the many properties with water views. Proximity to Manhattan attracted such men as J. P. Morgan, William K. Vanderbilt, and Charles Pratt, whose estates led to this area being nicknamed the Gold Coast. This period and the area was immortalized in fiction, such as F. Scott Fitzgerald's The Great Gatsby, which has also been adapted in films.

=== 20th century ===
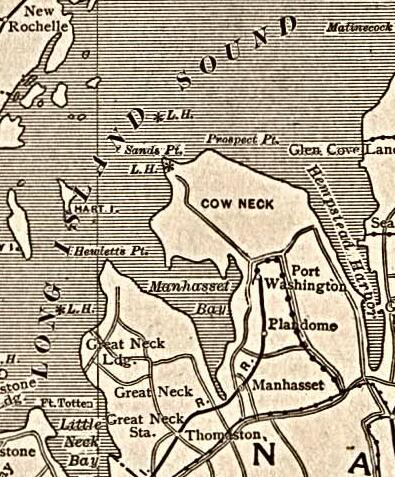
Manhasset Bay, along the North Shore of Nassau County, as seen on a map from 1917

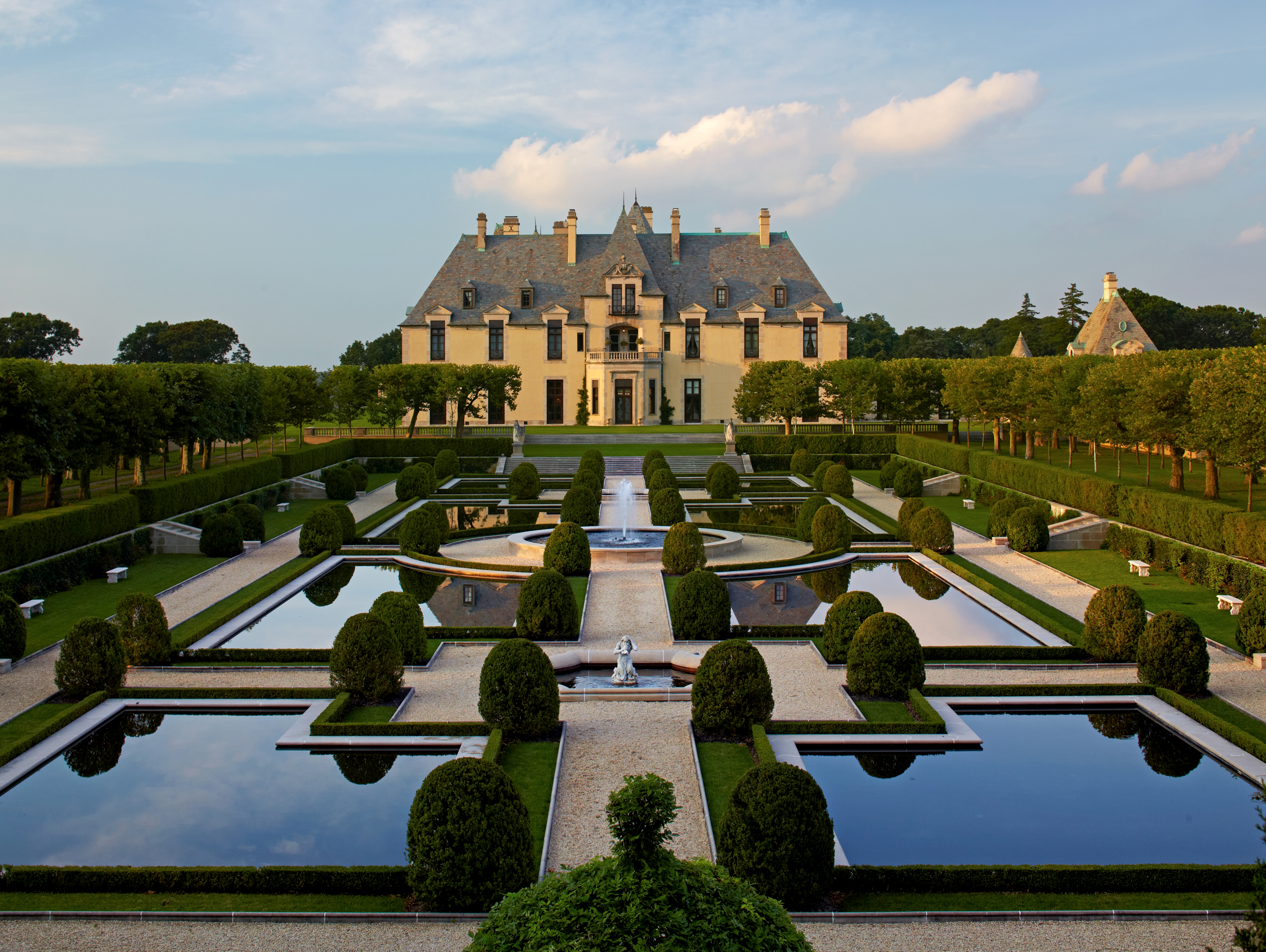
Oheka Castle, a North Shore estate in West Hills and the second-largest private residence in the country

The gradual decline in Indigenous authority reached a critical point when it led to the formal obliteration of acknowledgement for many tribes. A poignant example of this phenomenon occurred in 1910, when a legal decree by the Judiciary of New York pronounced the Montaukett "tribe" extinct, ignoring the presence and testimonies of its members in court. Such decrees were used to facilitate the encroachment on Native American lands with greater ease, granting legal legitimacy to the acts of settler colonialism. In the absence of legally recognized Indigenous territories, settlers could assert ownership over Native lands without engaging in negotiations or offering compensation. This act represented the final stage in the thorough domination and displacement of Native American communities on Long Island.

Charles Lindbergh lifted off from Roosevelt Field with his Spirit of St. Louis for his historic 1927 solo flight to Europe, one of the events that helped to establish Long Island as an early center of aviation during the 20th century. Other famous aviators such as Wiley Post originated notable flights from Floyd Bennett Field in Brooklyn, which became the first major airport serving New York City before it was superseded by the opening of La Guardia Airport in 1939. Long Island was also the site of Mitchel Air Force Base and was a major center of military aircraft production by companies such as Grumman and Fairchild Aircraft during World War II and for some decades afterward. Aircraft production on Long Island extended all the way into the Space Age. Grumman was one of the major contractors that helped to build the early lunar flight and Space Shuttle vehicles. Although the aircraft companies eventually ended their Long Island operations and the early airports were all later closed. Roosevelt Field, for instance, became the site of a major shopping mall, the Cradle of Aviation Museum on the site of the former Mitchel Field documents the Island's key role in the history of aviation.

From the 1920s to the 1940s, Long Island began the transformation from backwoods and farms as developers created numerous suburbs. Numerous branches of the Long Island Rail Road (LIRR) already enabled commuting from the suburbs to Manhattan. Robert Moses engineered various automobile parkway projects to span the island, and developed beaches and state parks for the enjoyment of residents and visitors from the city. Gradually, development also followed these parkways, with various communities springing up along the more traveled routes.

After World War II, suburban development increased with incentives under the G.I. Bill, and Long Island's population skyrocketed, mostly in Nassau County and western Suffolk County. Second and third-generation children of immigrants moved out to eastern Long Island to settle in new housing developments built during the post-war boom. Levittown became noted as a suburb, where housing construction was simplified to be produced on a large scale. These provided opportunities for white World War II military veterans returning home to buy houses and start a family. In his 1966 book, My Private America (Moja prywatna Ameryka), Kazimierz Wierzyński, a Polish poet who could not go back to Poland after World War II, describes Polish farmers living there, as "walking novels".

=== 21st century ===
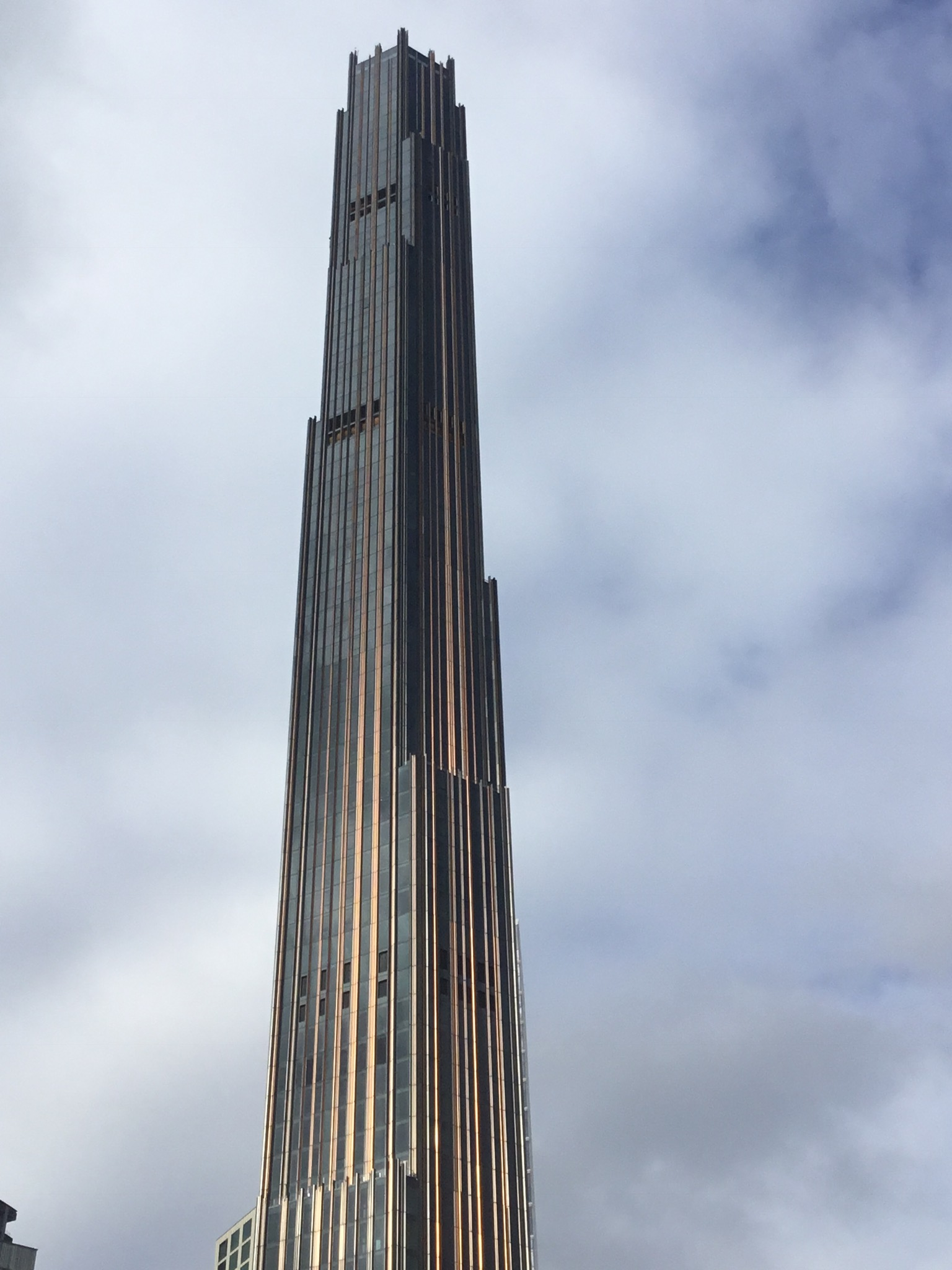
The Brooklyn Tower, a 93-story supertall skyscraper in Downtown Brooklyn, the tallest building on Long Island as of 2021 at a height of 1,073 feet (327 m)

At the beginning of the 21st century, a number of Long Island communities had converted their assets from industrial uses to post-industrial roles. Brooklyn reversed decades of population decline and factory closings to resurface as a globally renowned cultural and intellectual hotbed. Gentrification has impacted much of Brooklyn and a portion of Queens, relocating a sizeable swath of New York City's population. On eastern Long Island, Port Jefferson, Patchogue, and Riverhead evolved from inactive shipbuilding and mill towns into tourist-centric commercial centers with cultural attractions.

The descendants of late 19th and early 20th-century immigrants from southern and Eastern Europe, and Black migrants from the South, were followed by more recent immigrants from Asia and Latin America. Long Island has many ethnic Irish, Jews, and Italians. In later immigration trends, Asians, Hispanics, Afghans, Arabs, and Indians arrived on Long Island.

== Geography ==
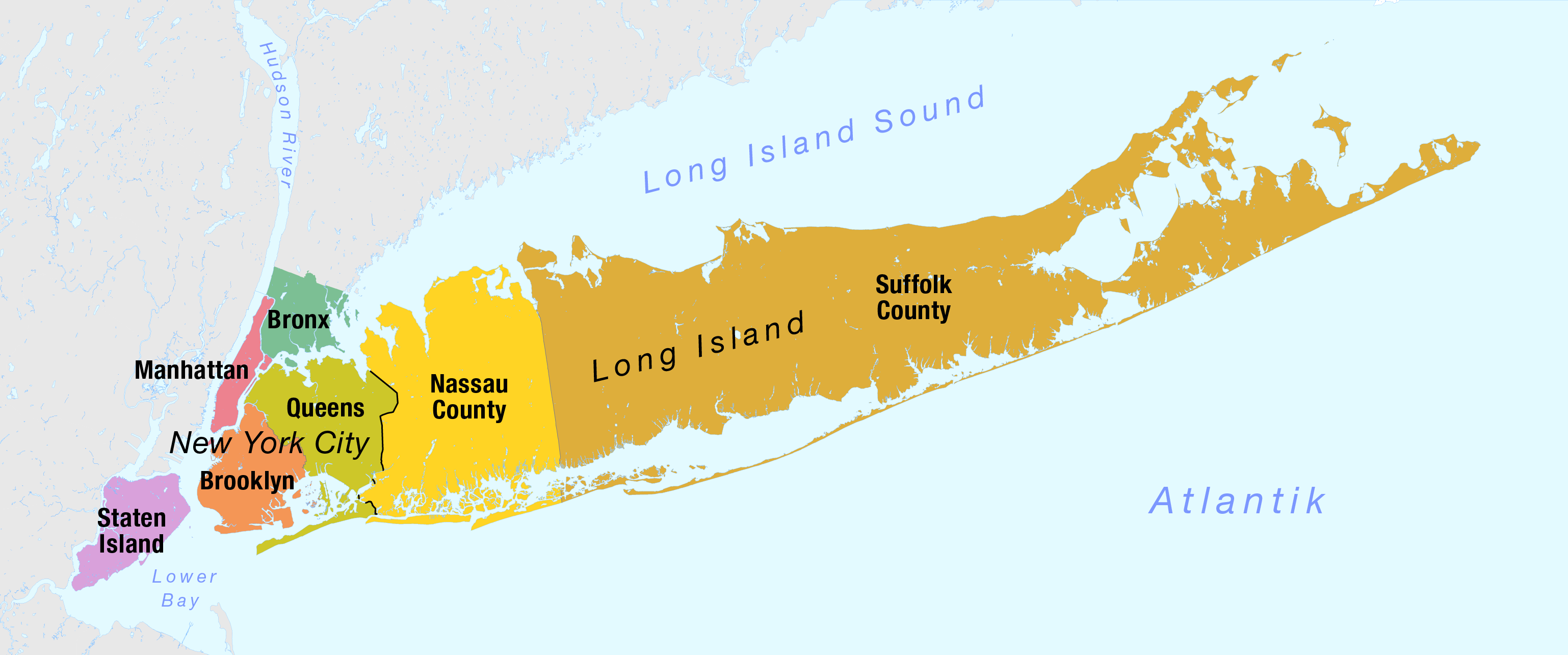
The four counties of Long Island include two independent counties, Nassau and Suffolk, and two New York City boroughs, Kings (Brooklyn) and Queens

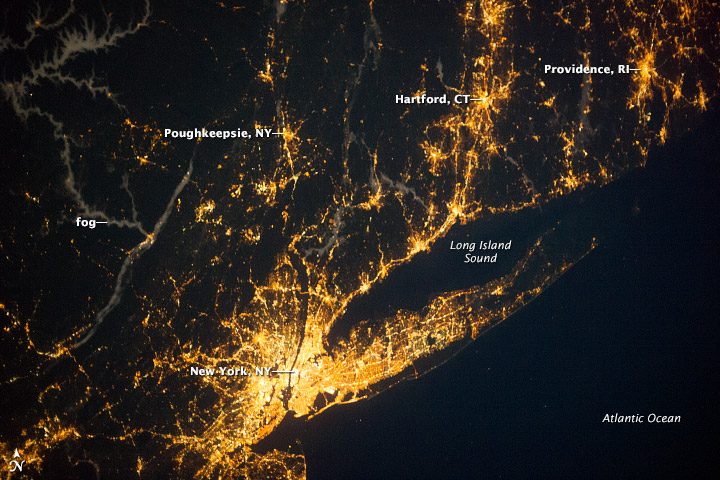
Satellite imagery showing the New York metropolitan area at night; Long Island is highly developed and densely populated, extending approximately 120 miles (190 km) eastward from the central core of Manhattan.

The westernmost end of Long Island contains the New York City boroughs of Brooklyn (Kings County) and Queens (Queens County). The central and eastern portions contain the suburban Nassau and Suffolk counties. However, colloquial usage of the term "Long Island" usually refers only to Nassau and Suffolk counties. For example, the Federal Reserve Bank of New York has a district named "Long Island (Nassau-Suffolk Metro Division)." At least as late as 1911, locations in Queens were still commonly referred to as being on Long Island. Some institutions in the New York City section of the island use the island's names, like Long Island University and Long Island Jewish Medical Center.

In 1985, the U.S. Supreme Court ruled in United States v. Maine that Long Island is integrally related to the mainland enough that Long Island Sound and the western part of Block Island Sound constitute a "juridical bay" for the purpose of determining maritime state boundaries. In the popular media, this has been often misinterpreted as a ruling that Long Island is legally not an island. The United States Board on Geographic Names still considers Long Island an island, because it is surrounded by water.

There are few tall buildings on Long Island. Nassau County is more densely developed than Suffolk County. While affluent overall, Nassau County has pockets of more pronounced wealth with estates covering greater acreage within the Gold Coast of the North Shore and the Five Towns area on the South Shore. South Shore communities are built along protected wetlands of the island and contain white sandy beaches of Outer Barrier Islands fronting on the Atlantic Ocean. Dutch and English settlers from the time before the American Revolutionary War, as well as communities of Native Americans, populated the island. The 19th century saw the infusion of the wealthiest Americans in the so-called Gold Coast of the North Shore, where wealthy Americans and Europeans in the Gilded Age built lavish country homes.

East of Riverhead in Suffolk County, Long Island splits into two peninsulas (colloquially referred to as "Forks"), which are separated by the Peconic Bay. The easternmost point of the North Fork is Orient Point, and the easternmost point of the South Fork (and all of Long Island) is Montauk Point. Long Island's East End remains semi-rural, as in Greenport on the North Fork and some of the periphery of the area prominently known as The Hamptons, although summer tourism swells the population in those areas. The North Fork has developed a burgeoning wine region. In addition, the South Fork is known for beach communities, including the Hamptons, and for the Montauk Point Lighthouse at the eastern tip of the island. The Pine Barrens is a preserved pine forest encompassing much of eastern Suffolk County.

=== Geology ===
A detailed geomorphological study of Long Island provides evidence of glacial history of the kame and terminal moraines of the island which were formed by the advance and retreat of two ice sheets. Long Island, as part of the Outer Lands region, is formed largely of two spines of glacial moraine, with a large, sandy outwash plain beyond. These moraines consist of gravel and loose rock left behind during the two most recent pulses of Wisconsin glaciation during the ice ages some 21,000 years ago (19,000 BC). The northern moraine, which directly abuts the North Shore of Long Island at points, is known as the Harbor Hill moraine. The more southerly moraine, known as the Ronkonkoma moraine, forms the "backbone" of Long Island; it runs primarily through the very center of Long Island, roughly coinciding with the length of the Long Island Expressway.

The land to the south of this moraine to the South Shore is the outwash plain of the last glacier. One part of the outwash plain was known as the Hempstead Plains, and this land contained one of the few natural prairies to exist east of the Appalachian Mountains. The glaciers melted and receded to the north, resulting in the difference between the topography of the North Shore beaches and the South Shore beaches. The North Shore beaches are rocky from the remaining glacial debris, while the South Shore's are crisp, clear, outwash sand. Jayne's Hill, at 401 feet (122 m), within Suffolk County near its border with Nassau County, is the highest hill along either moraine; another well-known summit is Bald Hill in Brookhaven Town, not far from its geographical center at Middle Island. The glaciers also formed Lake Ronkonkoma in Suffolk County and Lake Success in Nassau County, each a deep kettle lake.

=== Countyscapes ===
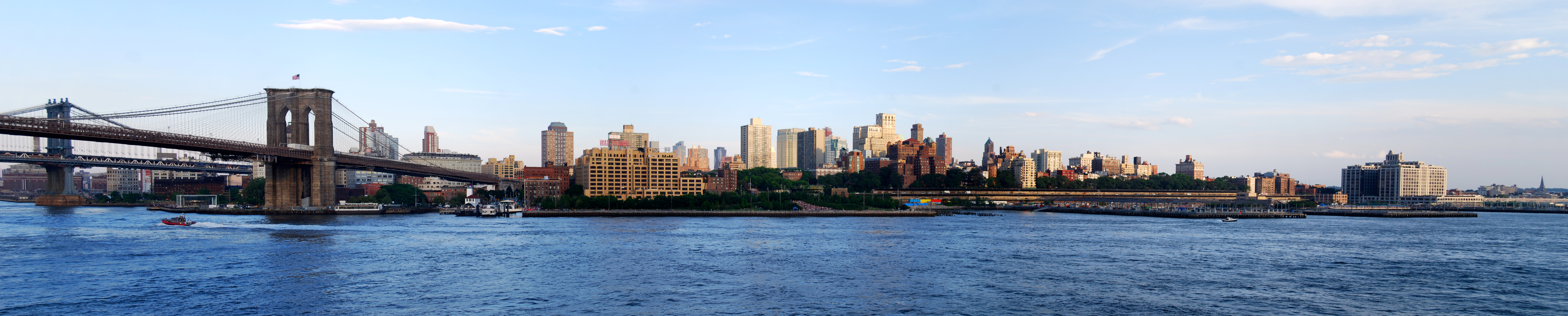
The Downtown Brooklyn skyline at the western end of Long Island with the Manhattan Bridge (far left) and the Brooklyn Bridge (near left) visible across the East River from Lower Manhattan at sunset in June 2013
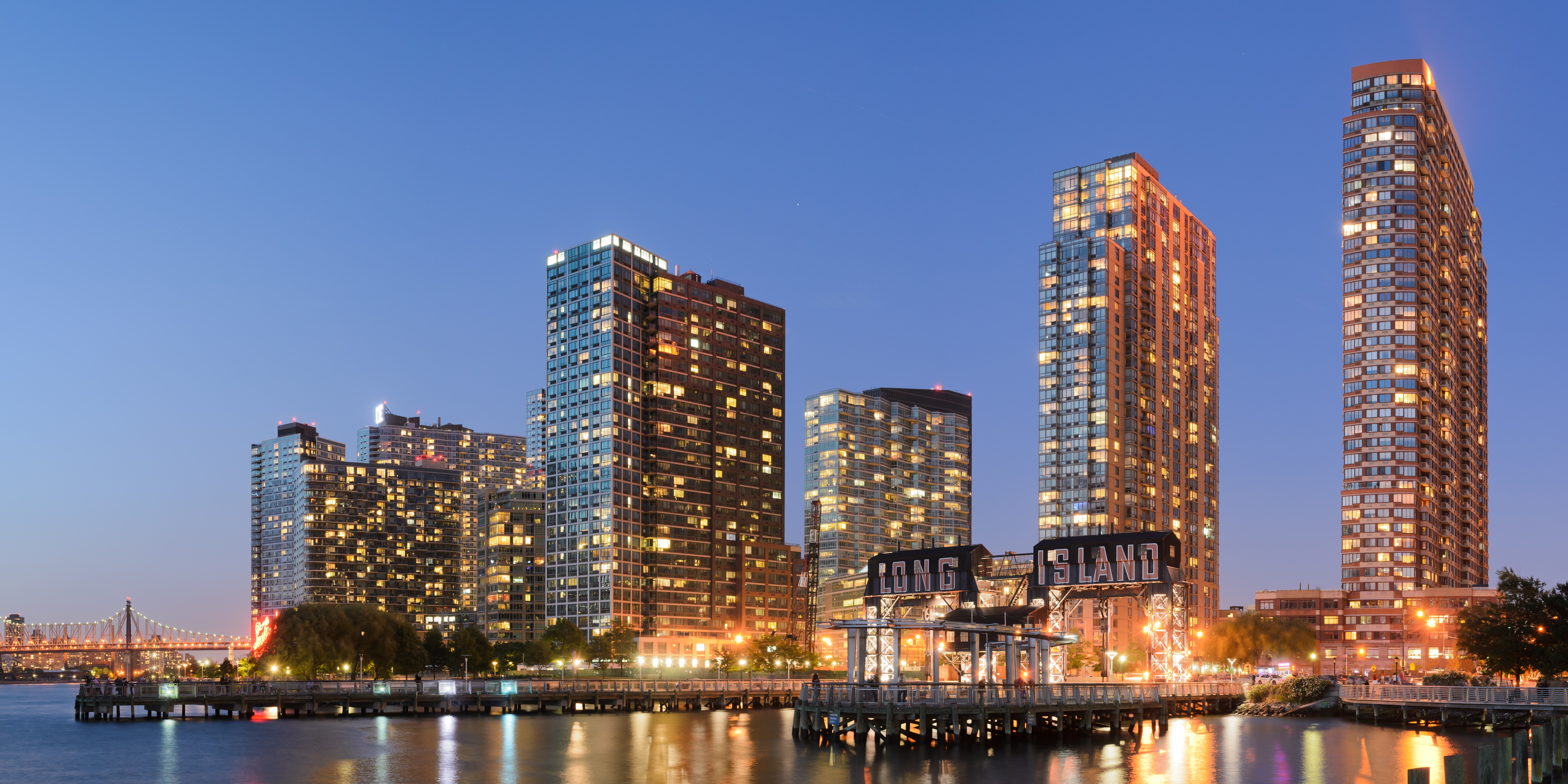
Long Island City in Queens, one of New York City and Long Island's fastest-growing neighborhoods, with the East River (foreground) and the Queensboro Bridge (left), which connects Queens and Manhattan, at blue hour in March 2015 .

=== Climate ===
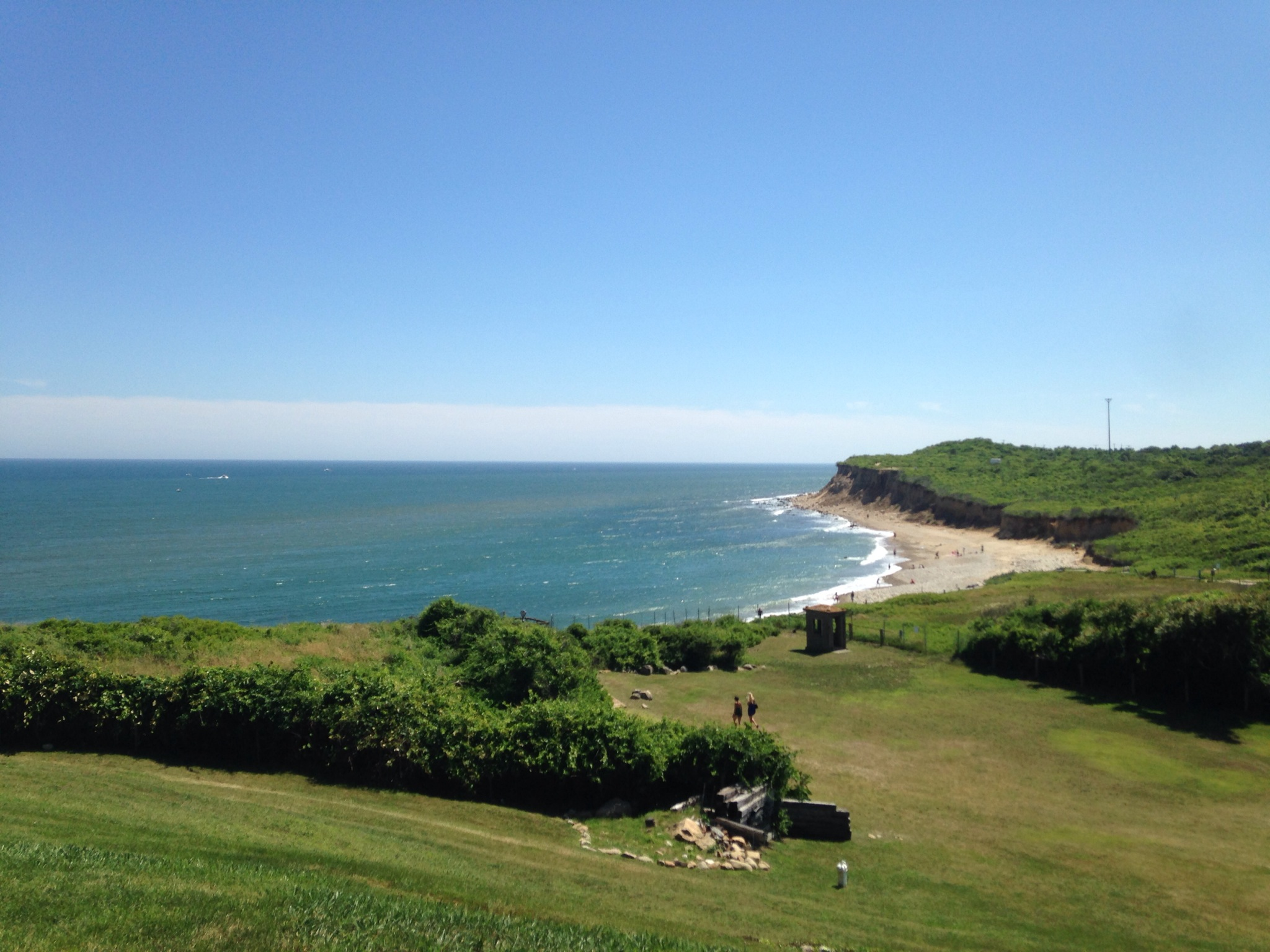
A beach in Montauk in Suffolk County in April 2015

Under the Köppen climate classification, Long Island lies in a transition zone between a humid subtropical climate (Cfa) and a hot-summer humid continental climate (Dfa). The climate features hot, usually humid summers with occasional thunderstorms, mild spring and fall weather, and cool winters with a mix of snow and rain and stormier conditions. Spring can be cool due to the relatively cooler temperatures of the Atlantic Ocean and occasional blocking. Thunderstorms rarely form directly over Long Island, but can form over inland areas and then move eastward. Some storms may weaken as they approach Long Island due to the moderating effects of the Atlantic Ocean. The ocean also brings afternoon sea breezes to the immediate South Shore areas (within 1 mile or 1.6 kilometers) that temper the heat in the warmer months. The temperatures south of Sunrise Highway (NY Route 27) tend to be significantly cooler than the rest of Long Island in the spring and summer months because of the relatively cooler temperatures of the Atlantic Ocean. Long Island has a moderately sunny climate, averaging 2,400 to 2,800 hours of sunshine annually.

Due to its coastal location, Long Island winter temperatures are milder than most of the state. The coldest month is January, when average temperatures range from 25 to 45 °F (−4 to 7 °C), and the warmest month is July, when average temperatures range from 74 to 85 °F (23 to 29 °C). Temperatures seldom fall below 0 °F (−18 °C) or rise above 100 °F (38 °C). Coldest temp ever recorded on Long Island was −23 °F (−31 °C) on January 22, 1961. Long Island temperatures vary from west to east, with the western part (Nassau County, Queens, and Brooklyn) generally 2 to 3 degrees F (1 to 2 degrees C) warmer than the east (Suffolk County). This is due to several factors: the western part is closer to the mainland and more densely developed, causing the "urban heat island" effect, and Long Island's land mass veers northward as one travels east. Also, daytime high temperatures on the eastern part of Long Island are cooler on most occasions, due to the moderating effect of the Atlantic Ocean and Long Island Sound. On dry nights with no clouds or wind, the Central Part of Suffolk County and Pine Barrens forest of eastern Suffolk County can be almost 5 to 10 F (3 to 5 C) cooler than the rest of the island, due to radiational cooling. Average dew points, a measure of atmospheric moisture, typically lie in the 65–75 °F (18–24 °C) range during July and August.

Precipitation is distributed uniformly throughout the year, with approximately 3–4 inches (76–102 mm) on average during each month. Average yearly snowfall totals range from approximately 20 to 35 inches (51 to 89 cm), with the north shore and western parts averaging more than the immediate south shore (South of Sunrise Hwy) and the east end. In any given winter, however, some parts of the island can see up to 50 inches (130 cm) of snow or more. There are also milder winters, in which much of the island see less than 10 inches (25 cm) of snow.

On August 13, 2014, flash flooding occurred in western-central Suffolk County after a record-setting rainfall deposited more than three months' worth of precipitation on the area within a few hours.

Long Island is somewhat vulnerable to tropical cyclones. While it lies north of where most tropical cyclones turn eastward and out to sea (most landfalls on the East Coast of the U.S. occur from North Carolina southward), several tropical cyclones have struck Long Island, including a devastating Category 3, the 1938 New England hurricane (also known as the "Long Island Express"), and another Category 3, Hurricane Carol in 1954. Other 20th-century storms that made landfall on Long Island at hurricane intensity include the 1944 Great Atlantic hurricane, Hurricane Donna in 1960, Hurricane Belle in 1976, and Hurricane Gloria in 1985. Also, the eyewall of Hurricane Bob in 1991 brushed the eastern tip. In August 2011, portions of Long Island were evacuated in preparation for Hurricane Irene, a Category 1 hurricane which weakened to a tropical storm before it reached Long Island.

On October 29, 2012, Hurricane Sandy caused extensive damage to low-lying coastal areas of Nassau and Suffolk counties, Brooklyn, and Queens, destroying or severely damaging thousands of area homes and other structures by ocean and bay storm surges. Hundreds of thousands of residents were left without electric power for periods of time ranging up to several weeks while the damage was being repaired. The slow-moving "Superstorm Sandy" (so-nicknamed because it merged with a nor'easter before it made landfall) caused 90% of Long Island households to lose power and an estimated $18 billion in damages in Nassau and Suffolk counties alone. The storm also had a devastating impact on coastal communities in the Brooklyn and Queens portions of the island, including Coney Island in Brooklyn and the Rockaway Peninsula in Queens, although estimates of monetary damages there are usually calculated as part of the overall losses suffered in New York City as a whole. When allowance is made for inflation, the extent of Sandy's damages is second only to that of those caused by the 1938 Long Island Express. Although a lower central pressure was recorded in Sandy, the National Hurricane Center estimates that the 1938 hurricane had a lower pressure at landfall. Hurricane Sandy and its profound impacts have prompted the discussion of constructing seawalls and other coastal barriers around the shorelines of Long Island and New York City to minimize the risk of destructive consequences from another such event in the future.

Climate data for Islip, New York (Long Island MacArthur Airport), 1991–2020 normals, (Note: Mean monthly maxima and minima (i.e. the expected highest and lowest temperature readings at any point during the year or given month) calculated based on data at said location from 1991 to 2020.) extremes 1963–present
Month	Jan	Feb	Mar	Apr	May	Jun	Jul	Aug	Sep	Oct	Nov	Dec	Year
Record high °F (°C)	69 (21)	71 (22)	82 (28)	94 (34)	98 (37)	101 (38)	104 (40)	100 (38)	94 (34)	89 (32)	80 (27)	77 (25)	104 (40)
Mean maximum °F (°C)	58.2 (14.6)	57.1 (13.9)	66.7 (19.3)	77.0 (25.0)	85.8 (29.9)	90.4 (32.4)	94.0 (34.4)	91.2 (32.9)	86.0 (30.0)	78.6 (25.9)	68.8 (20.4)	60.9 (16.1)	95.6 (35.3)
Mean daily maximum °F (°C)	39.2 (4.0)	41.0 (5.0)	47.7 (8.7)	58.3 (14.6)	68.3 (20.2)	77.2 (25.1)	82.8 (28.2)	81.4 (27.4)	74.8 (23.8)	64.1 (17.8)	53.6 (12.0)	44.4 (6.9)	61.1 (16.2)
Daily mean °F (°C)	31.9 (−0.1)	33.3 (0.7)	39.9 (4.4)	49.7 (9.8)	59.5 (15.3)	69.0 (20.6)	75.0 (23.9)	73.7 (23.2)	66.9 (19.4)	55.7 (13.2)	45.6 (7.6)	37.1 (2.8)	53.1 (11.7)
Mean daily minimum °F (°C)	24.6 (−4.1)	25.5 (−3.6)	32.0 (0.0)	41.2 (5.1)	50.8 (10.4)	60.9 (16.1)	67.3 (19.6)	66.0 (18.9)	58.9 (14.9)	47.3 (8.5)	37.6 (3.1)	29.8 (−1.2)	45.2 (7.3)
Mean minimum °F (°C)	7.4 (−13.7)	9.8 (−12.3)	17.0 (−8.3)	28.8 (−1.8)	37.9 (3.3)	48.4 (9.1)	57.7 (14.3)	55.7 (13.2)	45.4 (7.4)	33.0 (0.6)	22.9 (−5.1)	15.8 (−9.0)	5.4 (−14.8)
Record low °F (°C)	−8 (−22)	−14 (−26)	0 (−18)	16 (−9)	32 (0)	42 (6)	49 (9)	45 (7)	38 (3)	23 (−5)	11 (−12)	−1 (−18)	−14 (−26)
Average precipitation inches (mm)	3.66 (93)	3.29 (84)	4.51 (115)	4.06 (103)	3.28 (83)	4.00 (102)	3.26 (83)	4.24 (108)	3.60 (91)	3.97 (101)	3.41 (87)	4.71 (120)	45.99 (1,168)
Average snowfall inches (cm)	10.3 (26)	9.4 (24)	6.5 (17)	0.6 (1.5)	0.0 (0.0)	0.0 (0.0)	0.0 (0.0)	0.0 (0.0)	0.0 (0.0)	0.0 (0.0)	0.5 (1.3)	4.5 (11)	31.8 (81)
Average extreme snow depth inches (cm)	6.6 (17)	6.4 (16)	3.7 (9.4)	0.5 (1.3)	0.0 (0.0)	0.0 (0.0)	0.0 (0.0)	0.0 (0.0)	0.0 (0.0)	0.0 (0.0)	0.2 (0.51)	3.0 (7.6)	11.3 (29)
Average precipitation days (≥ 0.01 in)	11.1	9.9	10.8	11.3	11.6	10.1	9.1	8.9	8.6	9.2	9.6	11.8	122.0
Average snowy days (≥ 0.1 in)	3.8	3.7	2.7	0.3	0.0	0.0	0.0	0.0	0.0	0.0	0.3	2.6	13.4
Source: NOAA

Climate data for JFK Airport, New York (1991–2020 normals, (Note: Mean monthly maxima and minima (i.e. the expected highest and lowest temperature readings at any point during the year or given month) calculated based on data at said location from 1991 to 2020.) extremes 1948–present)
Month	Jan	Feb	Mar	Apr	May	Jun	Jul	Aug	Sep	Oct	Nov	Dec	Year
Record high °F (°C)	71 (22)	71 (22)	85 (29)	90 (32)	99 (37)	102 (39)	104 (40)	101 (38)	98 (37)	95 (35)	82 (28)	75 (24)	104 (40)
Mean maximum °F (°C)	57.7 (14.3)	58.3 (14.6)	67.5 (19.7)	77.9 (25.5)	85.6 (29.8)	92.4 (33.6)	95.2 (35.1)	91.9 (33.3)	87.9 (31.1)	79.7 (26.5)	68.9 (20.5)	60.6 (15.9)	96.8 (36.0)
Mean daily maximum °F (°C)	39.5 (4.2)	41.7 (5.4)	48.7 (9.3)	58.8 (14.9)	68.4 (20.2)	78.0 (25.6)	83.6 (28.7)	82.2 (27.9)	75.8 (24.3)	64.7 (18.2)	53.8 (12.1)	44.5 (6.9)	61.6 (16.4)
Daily mean °F (°C)	32.8 (0.4)	34.5 (1.4)	41.1 (5.1)	50.9 (10.5)	60.5 (15.8)	70.2 (21.2)	76.1 (24.5)	75.0 (23.9)	68.4 (20.2)	57.2 (14.0)	46.8 (8.2)	38.3 (3.5)	54.3 (12.4)
Mean daily minimum °F (°C)	26.2 (−3.2)	27.4 (−2.6)	33.6 (0.9)	42.9 (6.1)	52.5 (11.4)	62.4 (16.9)	68.7 (20.4)	67.8 (19.9)	61.0 (16.1)	49.8 (9.9)	39.8 (4.3)	32.0 (0.0)	47.0 (8.3)
Mean minimum °F (°C)	10.2 (−12.1)	13.3 (−10.4)	20.2 (−6.6)	32.6 (0.3)	42.9 (6.1)	52.6 (11.4)	62.8 (17.1)	60.1 (15.6)	50.0 (10.0)	37.9 (3.3)	26.9 (−2.8)	18.6 (−7.4)	8.2 (−13.2)
Record low °F (°C)	−2 (−19)	−2 (−19)	7 (−14)	20 (−7)	34 (1)	45 (7)	55 (13)	46 (8)	40 (4)	30 (−1)	15 (−9)	2 (−17)	−2 (−19)
Average precipitation inches (mm)	3.23 (82)	2.76 (70)	3.94 (100)	3.55 (90)	3.66 (93)	3.85 (98)	3.86 (98)	4.11 (104)	3.58 (91)	3.72 (94)	3.07 (78)	3.96 (101)	43.29 (1,100)
Average snowfall inches (cm)	7.5 (19)	8.6 (22)	4.3 (11)	0.6 (1.5)	0.0 (0.0)	0.0 (0.0)	0.0 (0.0)	0.0 (0.0)	0.0 (0.0)	0.0 (0.0)	0.4 (1.0)	4.5 (11)	25.9 (66)
Average precipitation days (≥ 0.01 inch)	10.7	9.8	10.8	11.4	11.8	10.6	9.4	9.0	8.2	9.4	8.9	11.2	121.2
Average snowy days (≥ 0.1 in)	4.6	3.8	2.5	0.3	0.0	0.0	0.0	0.0	0.0	0.0	0.2	2.6	14.0
Average relative humidity (%)	64.9	64.4	63.4	64.1	69.5	71.5	71.4	71.7	71.9	69.1	67.9	66.3	68.0
Source: NOAA (relative humidity 1961–1990)

Climate data for New York LaGuardia Airport, NY (1991-2020 normals, extremes 1939-present)
Month	Jan	Feb	Mar	Apr	May	Jun	Jul	Aug	Sep	Oct	Nov	Dec	Year
Record high °F (°C)	72 (22)	79 (26)	86 (30)	94 (34)	97 (36)	101 (38)	107 (42)	104 (40)	102 (39)	95 (35)	83 (28)	75 (24)	107 (42)
Mean maximum °F (°C)	60.2 (15.7)	60.0 (15.6)	69.3 (20.7)	81.7 (27.6)	89.3 (31.8)	94.1 (34.5)	97.4 (36.3)	94.7 (34.8)	89.6 (32.0)	81.2 (27.3)	70.9 (21.6)	62.8 (17.1)	98.7 (37.1)
Mean daily maximum °F (°C)	40.2 (4.6)	42.7 (5.9)	49.9 (9.9)	61.3 (16.3)	71.8 (22.1)	81.1 (27.3)	86.4 (30.2)	84.5 (29.2)	77.2 (25.1)	66.0 (18.9)	55.0 (12.8)	45.4 (7.4)	63.5 (17.5)
Daily mean °F (°C)	34.4 (1.3)	36.3 (2.4)	43.1 (6.2)	53.6 (12.0)	63.7 (17.6)	73.4 (23.0)	79.2 (26.2)	77.7 (25.4)	70.8 (21.6)	59.6 (15.3)	49.1 (9.5)	40.0 (4.4)	56.8 (13.8)
Mean daily minimum °F (°C)	28.6 (−1.9)	29.9 (−1.2)	36.2 (2.3)	46.0 (7.8)	55.7 (13.2)	65.7 (18.7)	71.9 (22.2)	71.0 (21.7)	64.4 (18.0)	53.3 (11.8)	43.2 (6.2)	34.7 (1.5)	50.1 (10.1)
Mean minimum °F (°C)	11.1 (−11.6)	13.6 (−10.2)	21.0 (−6.1)	34.2 (1.2)	45.6 (7.6)	54.3 (12.4)	63.5 (17.5)	62.4 (16.9)	52.9 (11.6)	40.7 (4.8)	29.4 (−1.4)	19.4 (−7.0)	8.7 (−12.9)
Record low °F (°C)	−3 (−19)	−7 (−22)	7 (−14)	22 (−6)	36 (2)	46 (8)	56 (13)	51 (11)	42 (6)	30 (−1)	17 (−8)	−2 (−19)	−7 (−22)
Average precipitation inches (mm)	3.25 (83)	2.93 (74)	4.01 (102)	3.85 (98)	3.58 (91)	4.03 (102)	4.30 (109)	4.41 (112)	3.88 (99)	3.81 (97)	3.15 (80)	4.08 (104)	45.28 (1,150)
Average snowfall inches (cm)	8.6 (22)	9.8 (25)	5.4 (14)	0.4 (1.0)	0.0 (0.0)	0.0 (0.0)	0.0 (0.0)	0.0 (0.0)	0.0 (0.0)	0.1 (0.25)	0.3 (0.76)	5.2 (13)	29.8 (76)
Average precipitation days (≥ 0.01 in)	10.3	10.2	10.9	11.2	11.6	10.7	9.7	9.5	8.3	9.0	8.8	11.5	121.7
Average snowy days (≥ 0.1 in)	4.4	3.7	2.6	0.2	0.0	0.0	0.0	0.0	0.0	0.0	0.2	2.7	13.8
Source: NOAA

Climate data for Montauk Airport, New York, 1991–2020 normals, extremes 1998–present
Month	Jan	Feb	Mar	Apr	May	Jun	Jul	Aug	Sep	Oct	Nov	Dec	Year
Record high °F (°C)	64 (18)	64 (18)	71 (22)	89 (32)	88 (31)	92 (33)	98 (37)	98 (37)	91 (33)	84 (29)	76 (24)	70 (21)	98 (37)
Mean maximum °F (°C)	55.7 (13.2)	54.0 (12.2)	61.3 (16.3)	70.8 (21.6)	80.1 (26.7)	86.0 (30.0)	90.9 (32.7)	88.5 (31.4)	82.9 (28.3)	75.5 (24.2)	66.4 (19.1)	60.3 (15.7)	92.1 (33.4)
Mean daily maximum °F (°C)	39.6 (4.2)	40.5 (4.7)	45.8 (7.7)	55.0 (12.8)	64.4 (18.0)	74.2 (23.4)	80.3 (26.8)	79.6 (26.4)	73.1 (22.8)	63.3 (17.4)	53.5 (11.9)	45.3 (7.4)	59.5 (15.3)
Daily mean °F (°C)	33.7 (0.9)	34.3 (1.3)	39.5 (4.2)	48.1 (8.9)	57.0 (13.9)	66.9 (19.4)	73.2 (22.9)	72.9 (22.7)	66.7 (19.3)	57.1 (13.9)	47.6 (8.7)	39.4 (4.1)	53.0 (11.7)
Mean daily minimum °F (°C)	27.7 (−2.4)	28.1 (−2.2)	33.2 (0.7)	41.2 (5.1)	49.6 (9.8)	59.6 (15.3)	66.2 (19.0)	66.2 (19.0)	60.4 (15.8)	51.0 (10.6)	41.6 (5.3)	33.6 (0.9)	46.5 (8.1)
Mean minimum °F (°C)	11.3 (−11.5)	14.1 (−9.9)	19.7 (−6.8)	30.1 (−1.1)	38.9 (3.8)	49.5 (9.7)	58.9 (14.9)	56.7 (13.7)	49.5 (9.7)	39.6 (4.2)	28.1 (−2.2)	20.5 (−6.4)	9.4 (−12.6)
Record low °F (°C)	5 (−15)	−2 (−19)	8 (−13)	25 (−4)	31 (−1)	43 (6)	51 (11)	54 (12)	39 (4)	30 (−1)	19 (−7)	12 (−11)	−2 (−19)
Average precipitation inches (mm)	3.63 (92)	3.20 (81)	4.18 (106)	3.66 (93)	3.19 (81)	3.50 (89)	2.81 (71)	4.02 (102)	3.64 (92)	4.22 (107)	3.91 (99)	4.35 (110)	44.31 (1,123)
Average precipitation days (≥ 0.01 in)	12.2	9.9	10.0	11.2	11.9	10.3	8.7	9.4	9.8	10.5	9.9	11.2	125.0
Source 1: NOAA
Source 2: National Weather Service (mean maxima/minima 2006–2020)

=== Additional islands ===
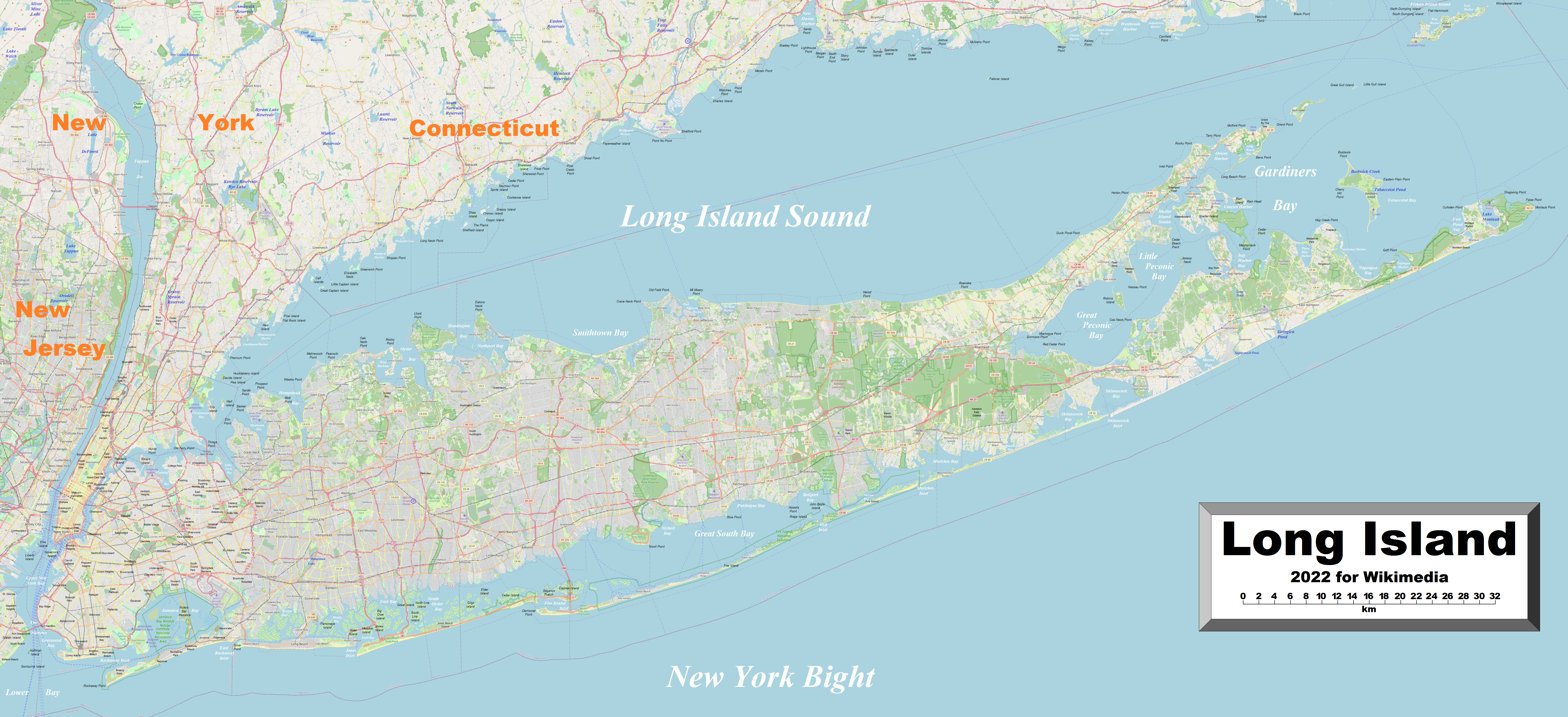
A detailed map of Long Island

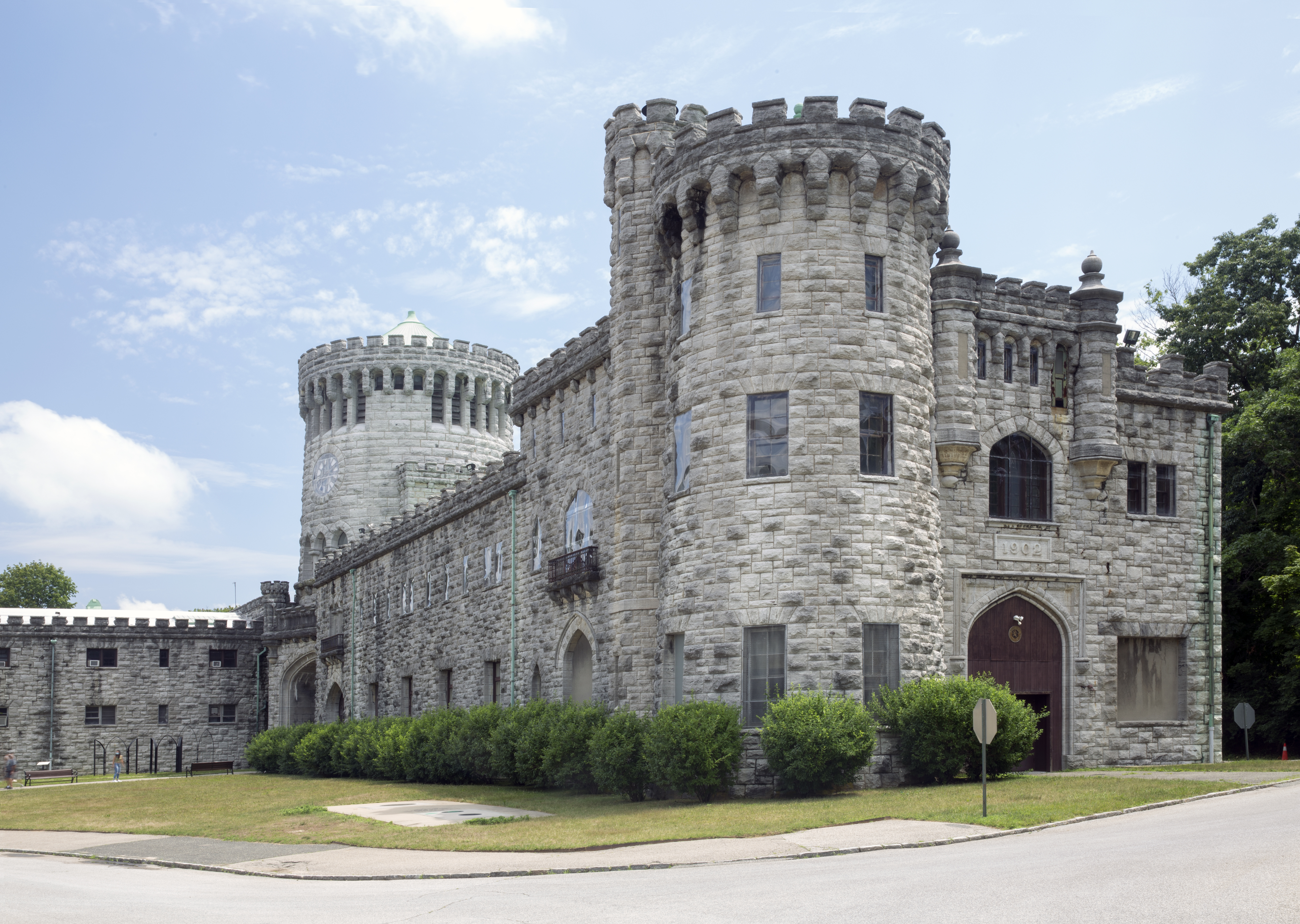
A mansion on Long Island's wealthy North Shore, which along with The Hamptons and Brooklyn's western waterfront (facing Manhattan) provides Long Island with some of world's most expensive residential real estate

Several smaller islands, though geographically distinct, are in proximity to Long Island and are often grouped with it. These islands include Fire Island, the largest of the outer barrier islands that parallels the southern shore of Long Island for approximately 31 miles (50 km); Plum Island, which was home to the Plum Island Animal Disease Center, a biological weapons research facility; Fishers Island and smaller islands Wicopesset Island, North Dumpling Island, South Dumpling Island, and Flat Hammock; as well as Robins Island, Gardiners Island, Long Beach Barrier Island, Jones Beach Island, Great Gull Island, Little Gull Island, and Shelter Island.

=== Environmental degradation ===
Long Island is a region affected by environmental degradation resulting from urban and suburban expansion beginning at the start of the 20th century. With the Long Island Sound to the north and the Atlantic Ocean to the south and east, Long Island is home to a diverse range of habitats including salt marshes, coastal grasslands, beaches, rocky intertidal zones, tidal flats, pine barrens, estuaries, deciduous forests and many more. Each of these habitats faces unique challenges in terms of environmental degradation but a few common issues can be found in each of them.

One of the most common forms of environmental degradation is eutrophication of lakes and ponds due to nutrient pollution. Nearly all of the bodies of water on Long Island have been affected by nutrient pollution in the form of nitrogen and phosphorus. Fertilizer containing high levels of nitrogen and phosphorus is washed into nearby surface water, accelerating the process of eutrophication. Common signs of eutrophication include murky green water and foul odor. Nutrient pollution is also responsible for harmful algal blooms which can be toxic to aquatic organisms, birds and mammals, including humans.

Chemical pollution is common on Long Island with it being home to 38 Superfund sites both closed and active. The four counties of Long Island have had chemical pollution, but Nassau County has the most out of the group with 18 superfund sites. Most famously from 1942 to 1996 Northrop Grumman and the United States Navy owned 600 acres where they manufactured military aircraft. Disposal practices of both parties resulted in a plume of VOCs or volatile organic compounds that contaminated groundwater in an area extending 4.3 miles north and south and 2.1 miles east and west. Restoration efforts have been ongoing since 2019 but concern over water quality still remains. Chemical pollution on Long Island often follows a similar pattern of negligence with hazardous chemicals that leak into groundwater and soil. Long Island drinking water is sourced from a large aquifer which is at risk of contamination if chemical pollution continues.

Long Island is one of the most developed areas in the United States with a majority of the high intensity development located closer to New York City and lower intensity development moving east across the island. High intensity development makes up 10% of the land cover on Long Island. Medium intensity development makes up 17%, and low intensity development makes up 17%. Developed open spaces account for 19% making the total percent of developed land around 63%. Most of the undeveloped land is found in Suffolk County which is made up of 46% undeveloped land. This level of development means most of the original habitats on Long Island have been destroyed or segmented by housing developments or roads. Tidal wetlands are the victims of the most habitat destruction due development of coastal land. New York has lost almost half of its tidal wetlands along the Long Island Sound. These tidal wetlands act as a natural barrier from flooding. As they are destroyed and developed the chances of flooding increase.

Climate change will affect Long Islanders in a number of ways in the future. It is estimated that at current rates by the year 2100 water levels will rise about four feet causing the relocation and destruction of neighborhoods along the coast of the island. As well as rising water levels, Long Islanders will have to deal with the effects of ever stronger hurricane seasons, and more catastrophic storms like Hurricane Sandy in 2012. Rising temperatures will also exacerbate the algal bloom problems, as algae tends to thrive in warmer waters. Restoration of coastlines and marsh habitats may provide some protection against flooding from large storms, but Long Island is largely unprepared for the increasing intensity of storms in the years to come.

== Demographics ==
Long Island is the most populous island and one of the most densely populated regions in the United States. At the 2020 U.S. census, the total population of all four counties of Long Island was 8,063,232, comprising 40% of the population of the State of New York. As of 2020, the proportion of New York City residents (total 8,804,190) living on Long Island had risen to 58.4%, given the 5,141,538 residents living in Brooklyn and Queens. Furthermore, the proportion of New York State's population residing on Long Island has also been increasing, with Long Island's census-estimated population increasing 6.5% since 2010, to 8,063,232 in 2020, representing 40% of New York State's census 2020-enumerated population of 20,215,751 and with a population density of 5,859.5 inhabitants per square mile (2,262.4/km^{2}) on Long Island; the island is more populous than most of the 50 U.S. states.

At the 2020 census, the combined population of Nassau and Suffolk counties was 2,921,694 people, Suffolk County's share being 1,525,920 and Nassau County's 1,395,774. Nassau County had a larger population for many decades, but Suffolk County surpassed it in the 1990 census as growth and development continued to spread eastward. As Suffolk County has more than three times the land area of Nassau County, the latter still has a much higher population density, given its proximity to New York City. According to the U.S. Census Bureau's 2008 American Community Survey, Nassau and Suffolk counties had the 10th and 26th highest median household incomes in the nation, respectively. Long Island lost over 111,000 residents to other states between 2017 and 2022. An exception was in 2020 during the pandemic, when Long Island saw a small net increase as city residents left for more space. Those who leave Long Island are generally younger than the median resident and less likely to have a four-year degree, children, or high income. Florida, Pennsylvania, and North Carolina are the biggest recipients of ex-Long Islanders. The Island has seen a net increase from New Yorkers leaving other parts of the state, and a net decrease of Long Islanders leaving for other areas in New York.

Historical population
Census	Pop.	Note	%±
1790	37,108		—
1800	42,907		15.6%
1810	48,752		13.6%
1820	56,978		16.9%
1830	69,775		22.5%
1840	110,406		58.2%
1850	212,637		92.6%
1860	379,788		78.6%
1870	540,648		42.4%
1880	743,957		37.6%
1890	1,029,097		38.3%
1900	1,452,611		41.2%
1910	2,098,460		44.5%
1920	2,723,764		29.8%
1930	4,103,638		50.7%
1940	4,600,022		12.1%
1950	5,237,918		13.9%
1960	6,403,852		22.3%
1970	7,141,515		11.5%
1980	6,728,074		−5.8%
1990	6,861,474		2.0%
2000	7,448,618		8.6%
2010	7,568,304		1.6%
2020	8,063,232		6.5%

Whites are the largest racial group in all four counties, and are in the majority in Nassau and Suffolk counties. In 2002, The New York Times cited a study by the non-profit group ERASE Racism, which determined that Nassau and Suffolk counties constitute the most racially segregated suburbs in the United States.

In contrast, Queens is the most ethnically diverse county in the United States and the most diverse urban area in the world.

According to a 2000 report on religion, which asked congregations to respond, Catholics are the largest religious group on Long Island, with non-affiliated in second place. Catholics make up 52% of the population of Nassau and Suffolk, versus 22% for the country as a whole, with Jews at 16% and 7%, respectively, versus 1.7% nationwide. Only a small percentage of Protestants responded, 7% and 8% respectively, for Nassau and Suffolk counties. This is in contrast with 23% for the entire country on the same survey, and 50% on self-identification surveys.

A growing population of nearly half a million Chinese Americans now live on Long Island. Rapidly expanding Chinatowns have developed in Brooklyn and Queens, with Chinese immigrants also moving into Nassau County, as did earlier European immigrants, such as the Irish and Italians. The busy intersection of Main Street, Kissena Boulevard, and 41st Avenue defines the center of Downtown Flushing and the Flushing Chinatown, known as the "Chinese Times Square" or the "Chinese Manhattan". The segment of Main Street between Kissena Boulevard and Roosevelt Avenue, punctuated by the Long Island Rail Road trestle overpass, represents the cultural heart of the Flushing Chinatown. Housing over 30,000 individuals born in China alone, the largest by this metric outside Asia, Flushing has become home to the largest and fastest-growing Chinatown in the world and home to one of the world's busiest pedestrian intersections, as the heart of over 250,000 ethnic Chinese in Queens, representing the largest Chinese population of any U.S. municipality other than New York City in total. Conversely, the Flushing Chinatown has also become the epicenter of organized prostitution in the United States, importing women from China, Korea, Thailand, and Eastern Europe to sustain the underground North American sex trade. Flushing is undergoing rapid gentrification with investment by Chinese transnational entities.

More recently, a Little India community has emerged in Hicksville, Nassau County, spreading eastward from the more established Little India enclaves in Queens. Rapidly growing Chinatowns have developed in Brooklyn and Queens, as did earlier European immigrants, such as the Irish and Italians. As of 2019, the Asian population in Nassau County had grown by 39% since 2010 to an estimated 145,191 individuals, including approximately 50,000 Indian Americans and 40,000 Chinese Americans, as Nassau County has become the leading suburban destination in the U.S. for Chinese immigrants. Likewise, the Long Island Koreatown originated in Flushing, Queens, and is expanding eastward along Northern Boulevard and into Nassau County.

Long Island is home to two Native American reservations, the Poospatuck Reservation of the state-recognized Unkechaug Nation, and the Shinnecock Reservation of the federally-recognized Shinnecock Indian Nation, both in Suffolk County. Numerous island place names are Native American in origin.

A 2010 article in The New York Times stated that the expansion of the immigrant workforce on Long Island has not displaced any jobs from other Long Island residents. Half of the immigrants on Long Island hold white-collar positions.

The counties of Nassau and Suffolk have been long renowned for their affluence. Long Island is home to some of the wealthiest communities in the United States, including The Hamptons, on the East End of the South Shore of Suffolk County; the Gold Coast, in the vicinity of the island's North Shore, along Long Island Sound; and increasingly, the western shoreline of Brooklyn, facing Manhattan. In 2016, according to Business Insider, the 11962 zip code encompassing Sagaponack, within Southampton, was listed as the most expensive in the U.S., with a median home sale price of $8.5 million.

== Economy ==
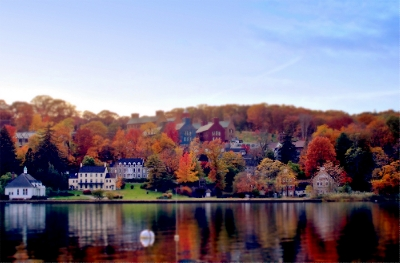
Cold Spring Harbor Laboratory on the North Shore of Nassau County, a biomedical research facility and home to eight Nobel Prize recipients

Long Island has played a prominent role in scientific research and in engineering. It is the home of the Brookhaven National Laboratory in nuclear physics and Department of Energy research. Long Island is also home to the Cold Spring Harbor Laboratory, which was directed for 35 years by James D. Watson (who, along with Francis Crick and Rosalind Franklin, discovered the double helix structure of DNA). Companies such as Sperry Corporation, Computer Associates (headquartered in Islandia), Zebra Technologies (now occupying the former headquarters of Symbol Technologies, and a former Grumman plant in Holtsville), have made Long Island a center for the computer industry. Stony Brook University and New York Institute of Technology conduct advanced medical and technological research.

Long Island is home to the East Coast's largest industrial park, the Hauppauge Industrial Park, hosting over 1,300 companies which employ more than 71,000 individuals. Companies in the park and abroad are represented by the Hauppauge Industrial Association. As many as 20% of Long Islanders commute to jobs in Manhattan. The island's eastern end is still partly agricultural. Development of vineyards on the North Fork has spawned a major viticultural industry, replacing potato fields. Pumpkin farms have been added to traditional truck farming. Farms allow fresh fruit picking by Long Islanders for much of the year. Fishing continues to be an important industry, especially at Huntington, Northport, Montauk, and other coastal communities of the East End and South Shore.

From about 1930 to about 1990, Long Island was considered one of the aerospace manufacturing centers of the United States, with companies such as Grumman, Republic, Fairchild, and Curtiss having their headquarters and factories on Long Island. These operations have largely been phased out or significantly diminished.

== Government and politics ==
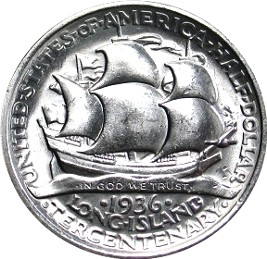
A commemorative half-dollar coin issued in 1936 for Long Island's 300th anniversary.

Nassau County and Suffolk County each have their own governments, with a County Executive leading each. Each has a county legislature and countywide-elected officials, including district attorney, county clerk, and county comptroller. The towns in both counties have their own governments as well, with town supervisors and a town council. Nassau County is divided into three towns and two small incorporated cities (Glen Cove and Long Beach). Suffolk County is divided into ten towns.

Brooklyn and Queens, on the other hand, do not have official county governments and are represented only by the Kings County and Queens County District Attorneys, respectively, who work for the State of New York. As boroughs of New York City, both have borough presidents, which have been largely ceremonial offices since the shutdown of the New York City Board of Estimate. The respective Borough Presidents are responsible for appointing individuals to the Brooklyn Community Boards and Queens Community Boards, each of which serves an advisory function on local issues. Brooklyn's sixteen members and Queens' fourteen members represent the first and second largest borough contingents of the New York City Council.

=== Law enforcement ===
Queens and Brooklyn are patrolled by the New York City Police Department. Nassau and Suffolk counties are served by the Nassau County Police Department and Suffolk County Police Department, respectively, although several dozen villages and the two cities in Nassau County have their own police departments. The Nassau County Sheriff's Department and Suffolk County Sheriff's Office handle civil procedure, evictions, warrant service and enforcement, prisoner transport and detention, and operation of the county jails. The Suffolk County Sheriff also has a patrol division, and in 2008, had patrol duties along the Long Island Expressway, when the County Executive briefly disbanded the Suffolk County Police Highway Patrol Division. The Suffolk County Sheriff's Office is the oldest law enforcement agency in the State of New York, founded in the year 1683. New York State Police patrol state parks and parkways. The several SUNY colleges and universities are patrolled by the New York State University Police.

=== Statehood proposals ===
The secession of Nassau and Suffolk counties on Long Island from New York State was proposed as early as 1896, but talk was revived towards the latter part of the twentieth century. On March 28, 2008, Suffolk County Comptroller Joseph Sawicki proposed a plan that would make Nassau and Suffolk counties on Long Island the 51st state of the United States of America. Sawicki claimed all of Nassau and Suffolk taxpayers' money would remain locally, rather than the funds being dispersed all over the entire state of New York, with these counties sending to Albany over three billion dollars more than they receive. The state of Long Island would have included nearly 3 million people (a larger population than that of fifteen other states). Nassau County executive Ed Mangano came out in support of such a proposal in April 2010 and commissioned a study on it.

== Education ==
=== Primary and secondary education ===
Many public and private high schools on Long Island are ranked among the best in the United States. Nassau and Suffolk counties are the home of 125 public school districts containing 656 public schools. Brookhaven Public Schools is the largest district. It also hosts private schools such as Friends Academy, Chaminade High School, Kellenberg Memorial High School, St. Anthony's High School, and North Shore Hebrew Academy. There also are many parochial schools on Long Island, including several operated by the Catholic Diocese of Rockville Centre.

In contrast, all of Brooklyn and Queens are served by the New York City Department of Education, the largest school district in the United States. Three of the nine specialized high schools in New York City are in the two Long Island boroughs, those being Brooklyn Latin School, Brooklyn Technical High School (one of the original three specialized schools), and Queens High School for the Sciences. Like Nassau and Suffolk counties, they are home to private schools such as Poly Prep Country Day School, Packer Collegiate Institute, and Saint Ann's School, and Berkeley Carroll School, and parochial schools operated by the Catholic Diocese of Brooklyn.

=== Colleges and universities ===
Long Island is home to a range of higher education institutions, both public and private. Brooklyn and Queens contain five of eleven senior colleges within CUNY, the public university system of New York City and one of the largest in the country. Among these are the notable institutions of Brooklyn College and Queens College. Brooklyn also contains private colleges such as Pratt Institute and the New York University Tandon School of Engineering, the engineering school of New York University.

Several colleges and universities within the State University of New York system are on Long Island, including Stony Brook University, Nassau Community College, and Suffolk County Community College. Notable private universities on Long Island include Molloy University in Rockville Centre, the New York Institute of Technology in Old Westbury, Hofstra University in Hempstead, Adelphi University in Garden City, Long Island University (with its C.W. Post campus on a former Gold Coast estate in Brookville and a satellite campus in downtown Brooklyn), the Webb Institute, a small naval architecture college in Glen Cove, and the U.S. Merchant Marine Academy, a U.S. service academy in Kings Point, on the North Shore.

== Culture ==
=== Music ===
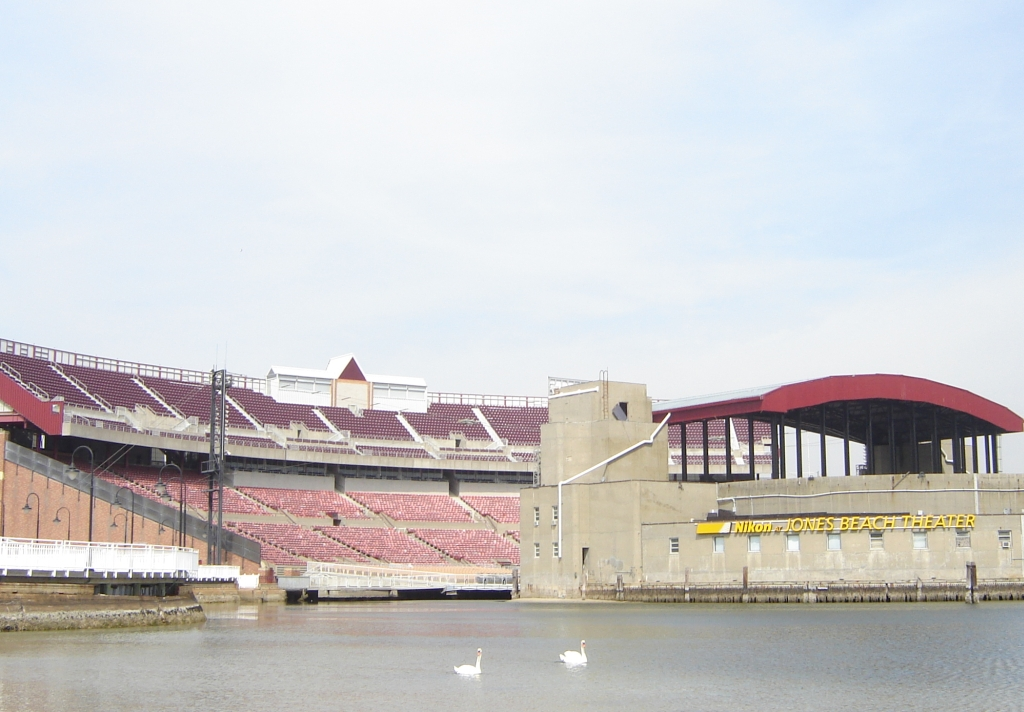
Jones Beach Theater, a 15,000-capacity theater and stadium in Wantagh, in March 2007

Music on Long Island (Nassau and Suffolk) is strongly influenced by the proximity to New York City and by the youth culture of the suburbs. Psychedelic rock was widely popular in the 1960s as flocks of disaffected youth travelled to NYC to participate in protest and the culture of the time. Rhythm and blues also has a history on Long Island, most notably Huntington-born Mariah Carey, one of the top-selling musicians of all time. In the late 1970s through the 1980s, the influence of radio station WLIR made Long Island one of the first places in the nation to hear and embrace European New Wave bands, including Depeche Mode, Pet Shop Boys, and Culture Club. In the 1990s, hip-hop became popular. Rap pioneers Rakim, EPMD, De La Soul, MF Doom, and Public Enemy grew up on Long Island. Long Island was the home of a bustling emo scene in the 2000s, with bands such as Brand New, Taking Back Sunday, Straylight Run, From Autumn to Ashes and As Tall as Lions. Rock bands from Long Island include the Rascals, the Ramones (from Queens), Dream Theater, Blue Öyster Cult, Twisted Sister, and guitar virtuosos Donald (Buck Dharma) Roeser, John Petrucci, Steve Vai, and Joe Satriani, and drummer Mike Portnoy. Rock and pop singer Billy Joel grew up in Hicksville, and his music references Long Island and his youth.

Nassau Coliseum and Jones Beach Theater are venues used by national touring acts as performance spaces for concerts. Jones Beach Theater is a popular place to view summer concerts that feature new and classic artists. It also hosts a large Fourth of July fireworks show annually.

Long Island is also known for its school music programs. Many schools in both Nassau and Suffolk County have distinguished music programs, with high numbers of students who are accepted into the statewide All-State music groups, or even the National All-Eastern Coast music groups. Both the Suffolk County and Nassau County Music Educator's Associations are recognized by The National Association for Music Education (NAfME), and host numerous events, competitions, and other music-related activities.

=== Cuisine ===
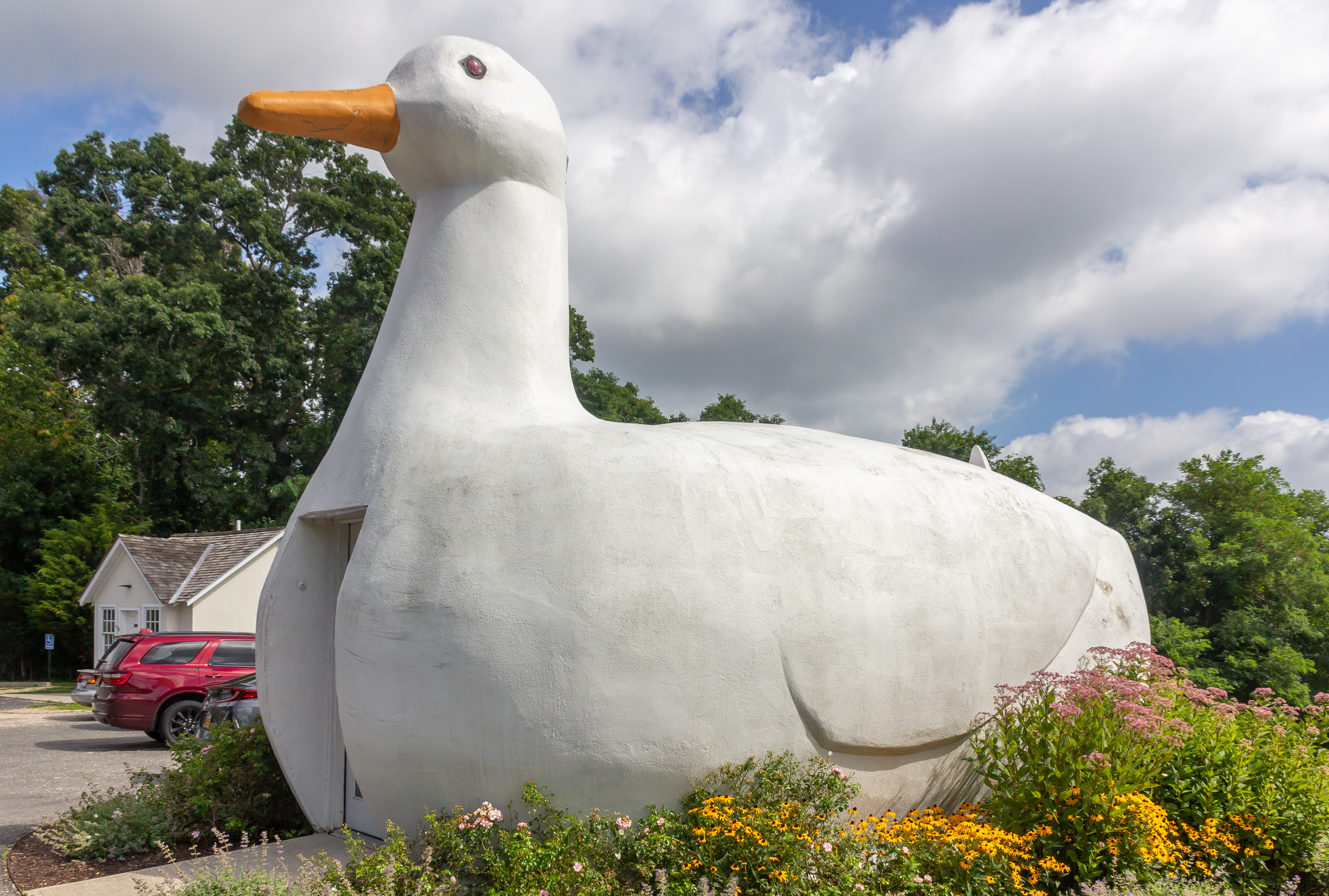
The Big Duck in Flanders in August 2018

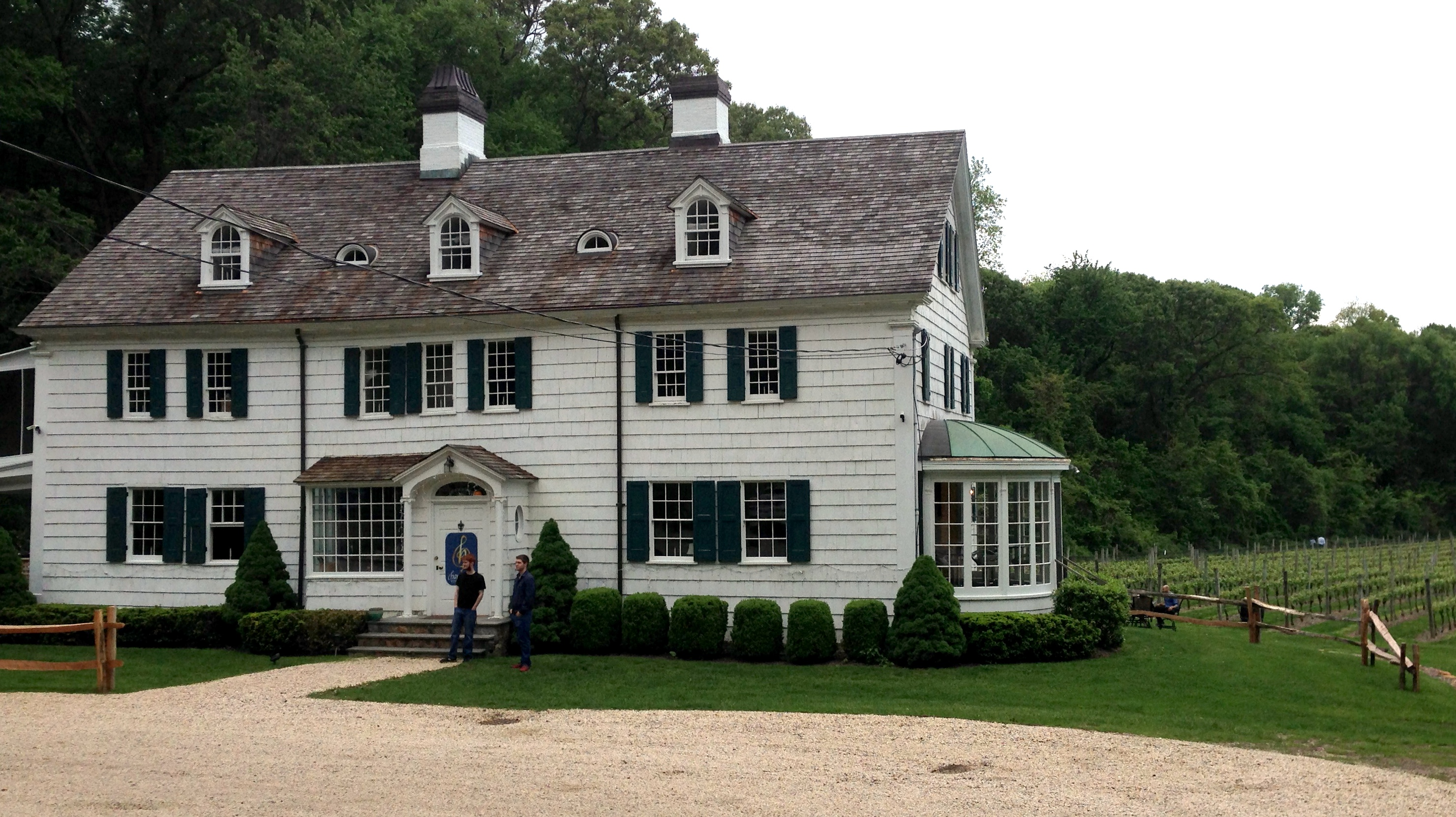
A winery and tasting room in a 1690 farmhouse near Stony Brook in May 2014

Long Island has historically been a center for fishing and seafood. This legacy continues in the Blue Point oyster, a now ubiquitous variety originally harvested on the Great South Bay that was the favorite oyster of Queen Victoria. Clams are also a popular food and clam digging a popular recreational pursuit, with Manhattan clam chowder reputed to have Long Island origins.

Of land-based produce, Long Island duck has a history of national recognition since the 19th century, with four duck farms continuing to produce 2 million ducks a year as of 2013. Two symbols of Long Island's duck farming heritage are the Long Island Ducks minor-league baseball team and the Big Duck, a 1931 duck-shaped building that is a historic landmark and tourist attraction. In addition to Long Island's duck industry, Riverhead contains one of the largest buffalo farms on the East coast.

Long Island is well known for its production of alcoholic beverages. Eastern Long Island is a significant producer of wine. Vineyards are most heavily concentrated on Long Island's North Fork, which contains 38 wineries. Most of these contain tasting rooms, which are popular attractions for visitors from across the New York metropolitan area. Long Island has also become a producer of diverse craft beers, with 15 microbreweries across Nassau and Suffolk counties as of 2013. The largest of these is Blue Point Brewing Company, best known for its toasted lager. Long Island is also globally known for its signature cocktail, the Long Island Iced Tea, which was purportedly invented at the popular Babylon Town Oak Beach Inn nightclub in the 1970s.

Long Island's eateries are largely a product of the region's local ethnic populations. Asian cuisines, Italian cuisine, Jewish cuisine, and Latin American cuisines were the most popular ethnic cuisines on Long Island as of the second decade of the 2000s. Asian cuisines are predominantly represented by East Asian, South Asian, and Middle Eastern cuisines. Italian cuisine is found in ubiquitous pizzerias throughout the island, with the region hosting an annual competition, the Long Island Pizza Festival & Bake-Off. Jewish cuisine is likewise represented by delicatessens and bagel stores. Latin American cuisines span their geographical origins, from Brazilian rodizios to Mexican taquerias.

=== Folklore and urban legends ===
Long Island has inspired numerous local legends over the centuries from the distant past to the present. For instance, numerous historic buildings and other locations on Long Island are rumored to be haunted including the Fire Island Lighthouse, Lake Ronkonkoma, Mount Misery Road, Country House Restaurant, and Raynham Hall. However, the most prominent supposedly haunted location on Long Island is the Amityville Horror House which has inspired numerous books and horror movies.

The Montauk Monster is at the center of numerous conspiracy theories. Long Island is also home to other stories of conspiracies and government cover-ups mainly centered around Camp Hero State Park and the Montauk Project. Peter Moon's book Pyramids of Montauk explores these theories, suggesting connections between Montauk and ancient civilizations. These conspiracy stories also helped inspire the hit Netflix show Stranger Things. Additionally, it is rumored that a UFO crash in Southaven County Park was covered up in 1992. More recently, an urban legend of a species of giant cryptid horseshoe crabs in the Great South Bay has emerged and spread around the internet. Many speculate the story is meant to draw attention to New York State horseshoe crab conservation issues.

=== Sports ===
==== Major league sports ====
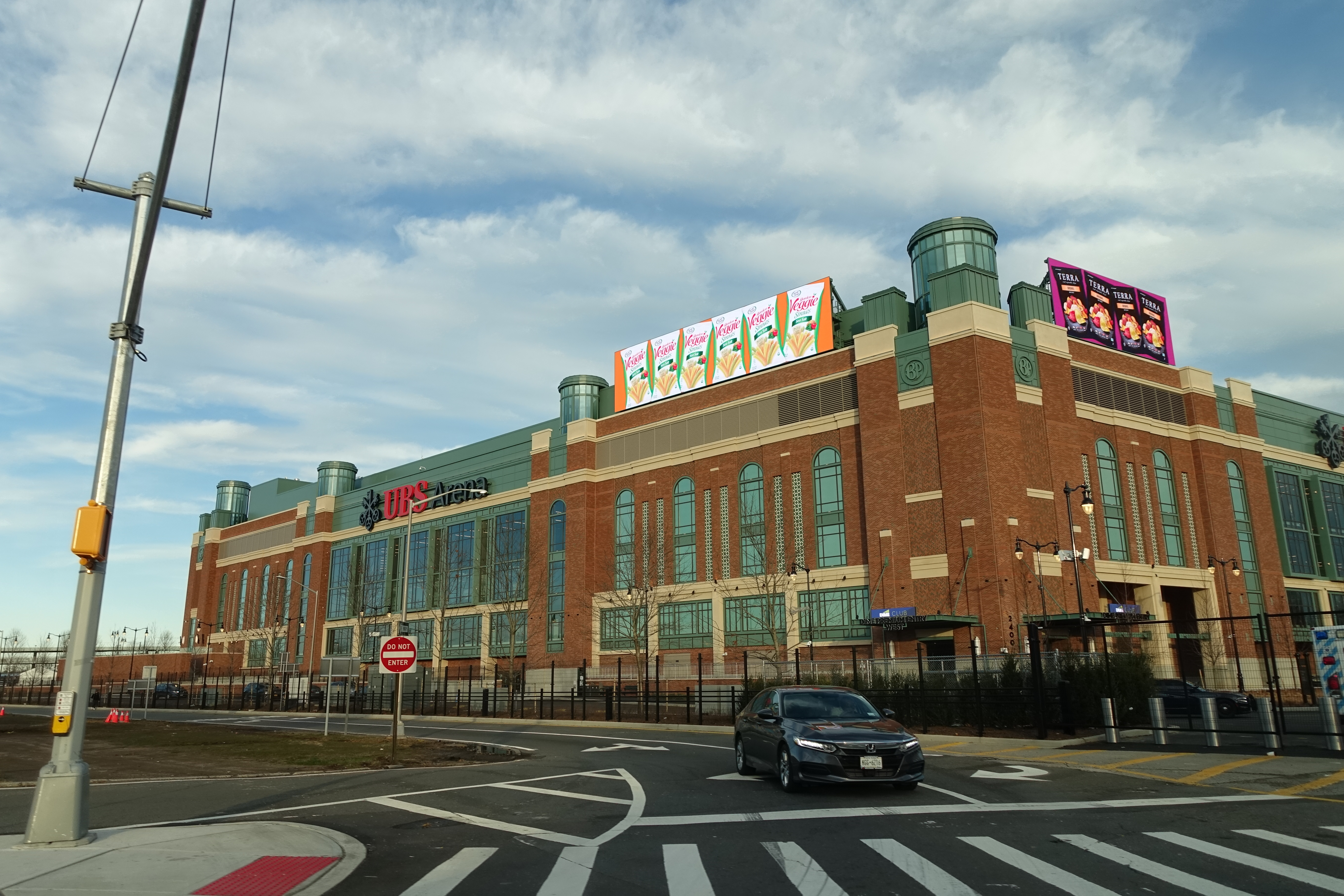
UBS Arena in Elmont in 2021. It is the home of the NHL's New York Islanders, a team named after Long Island

The New York Mets of Major League Baseball play at Citi Field in Flushing Meadows-Corona Park, Queens. Their former stadium, Shea Stadium, was also home for the New York Jets of the National Football League from 1964 until 1983. The new stadium has an exterior façade and main entry rotunda inspired by Brooklyn's famous Ebbets Field.

The Barclays Center, a sports arena, business, and residential complex built partly on a platform over the Atlantic Yards at Atlantic Avenue in Brooklyn, is the home of the Brooklyn Nets and New York Liberty basketball teams. The move from New Jersey in the summer of 2012 marked the return to Long Island for the Nets franchise, which played at Nassau Veterans Memorial Coliseum in Uniondale from 1972 to 1977. The New York Islanders hockey team played at Nassau Coliseum from their 1972 inception through 2015, and then split time between Nassau Coliseum and Barclays Center from 2017 to 2021, playing their last full season at the Nassau Coliseum during the 2020–21 NHL Season. The Islanders moved full-time to UBS Arena at Belmont Park, in Elmont, New York, in November 2021.

New York City FC, a Major League Soccer (MLS) team established in 2015, has played some home matches at Citi Field when Yankee Stadium, their primary venue, is unavailable. The team began construction of a new stadium, Etihad Park, adjacent to Citi Field in 2024. It is scheduled to open in 2027 and will have a capacity of 25,000 seats.

==== Historical professional teams ====
Ebbets Field, which stood in Brooklyn from 1913 until its demolition in 1960, was the home of the Brooklyn Dodgers baseball team, who moved to Los Angeles after the 1957 Major League Baseball season to become the Los Angeles Dodgers. The Dodgers won several National League pennants in the 1940s and 1950s, losing several times in the World Series, often called the Subway Series, to their Bronx rivals, the New York Yankees. The Dodgers won their lone championship in Brooklyn in the 1955 World Series versus the Yankees.

Despite this success during the latter part of the team's stay in Brooklyn, they were a second-division team with a losing record for much of their history there. The devotion of the Brooklynites who packed the ballpark to root for the team they affectionately called, "Dem Bums", has been noted. The loss of the Dodgers to California was locally considered a civic tragedy that affected the community more than the similar moves of other established teams to new cities in the 1950s, including the Dodgers' long-time arch-rival New York Giants, who also left for California after 1957.

==== Minor league sports ====
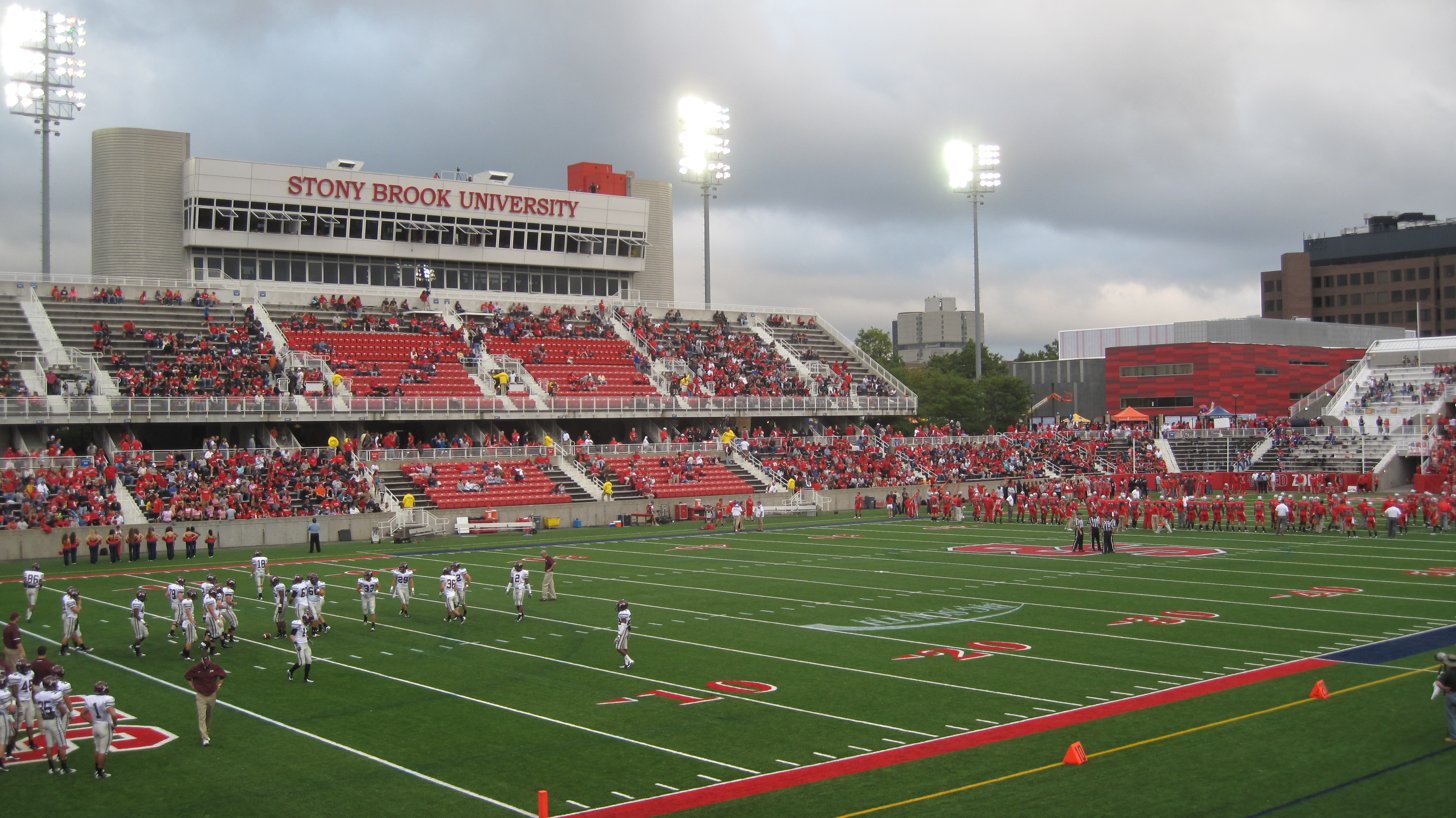
The Stony Brook Seawolves homecoming game in September 2012

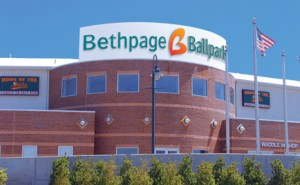
Bethpage Ballpark, home of the Long Island Ducks, in July 2011

Long Island is home to the Long Island Ducks independent league team of the Atlantic League. Their stadium, Bethpage Ballpark, is in Central Islip. The Brooklyn Cyclones minor league baseball team, affiliated with the New York Mets, plays in the High-A classification South Atlantic League. The Cyclones play at MCU Park just off the Coney Island Boardwalk in the New York City borough of Brooklyn. The New York Dragons of the Arena Football League played their home games at Nassau Coliseum. The two main rugby union teams are the Long Island RFC in East Meadow and the Suffolk Bull Moose in Stony Brook.

The Brooklyn Cyclones are a minor league baseball team, affiliated with the New York Mets. The Cyclones play at MCU Park just off the boardwalk on Coney Island in Brooklyn. An artificial turf baseball complex named Baseball Heaven is in Yaphank.

The New York Sharks is a women's American football team that is a member of the Women's Football Alliance. The New York Sharks home field is at Aviator Sports Complex in Brooklyn. The New York Mets planned to move their Double-A farm team to Long Island, as part of the ambitious but now-defunct plan for Nassau County called The Lighthouse Project.

Long Island's professional soccer club, the New York Cosmos, played in the Division 2 North American Soccer League at James M. Shuart Stadium in Hempstead until 2020.

Long Island has historically been a hotbed of lacrosse at the youth and college level, which made way for a Major League Lacrosse team in 2001, the Long Island Lizards. The Lizards play at Mitchel Athletic Complex in Uniondale.

==== Collegiate sports ====
The Stony Brook Seawolves represent Stony Brook University, and have had a bevy of athletic accomplishments such as reaching the 2012 College World Series as an underdog after defeating the LSU Tigers in a best-of-3 series.

==== Other sports ====
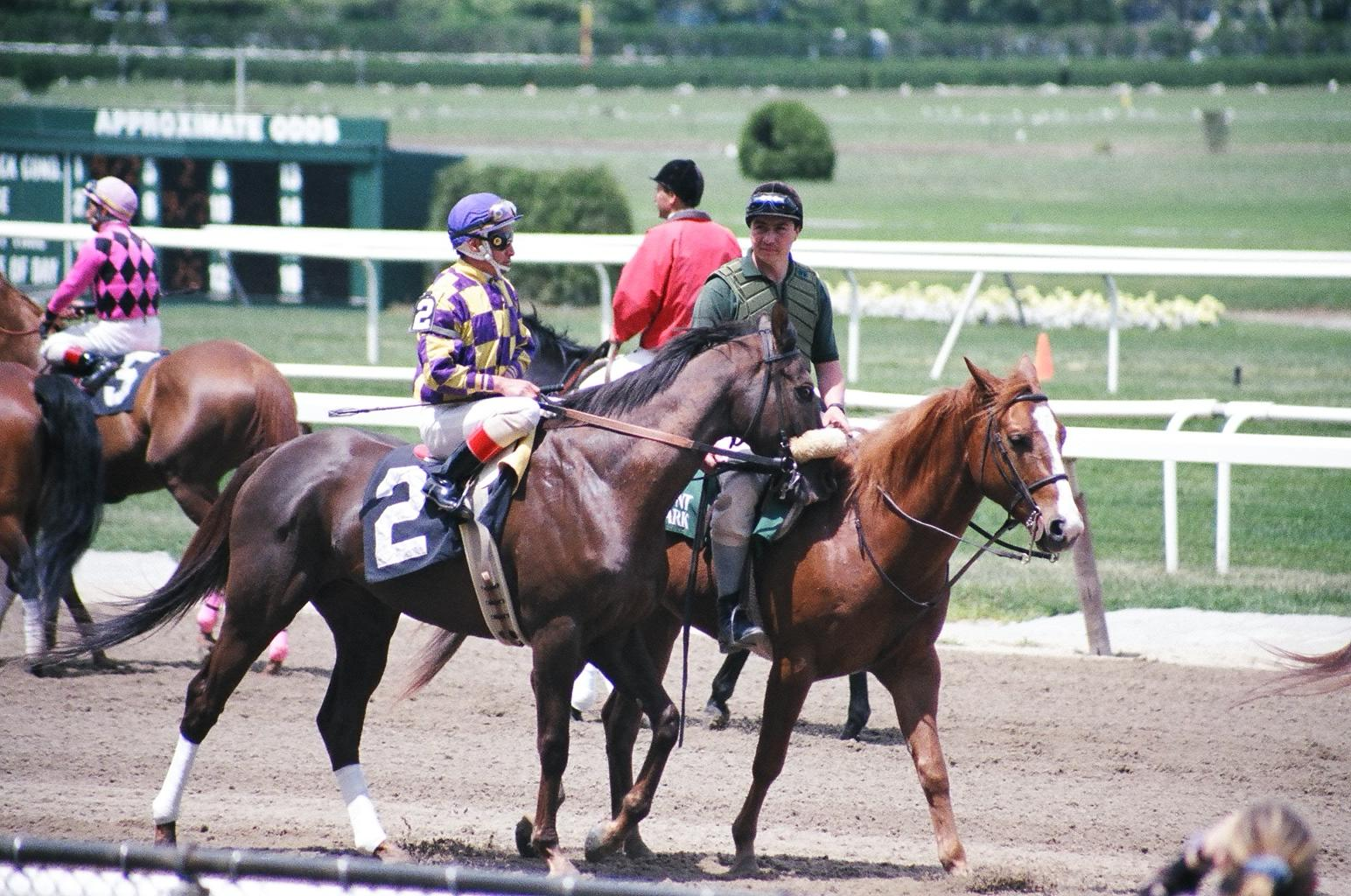
Preparing for the Belmont Stakes horse race, the final leg of the Triple Crown, at Belmont Park, in April 2005

Long Island has a wide variety of golf courses found all over the island. Two of the most well-known are the Shinnecock Hills Golf Club and the public Bethpage Black Course that has hosted multiple U.S. Open tournaments and several other top level international championships. Queens also hosts one of the four tennis grand slams, the US Open. Every August (September, in Olympic years) the best tennis players in the world travel to Long Island to play the championships held at the USTA Billie Jean King National Tennis Center, adjacent to Citi Field in Flushing Meadows Park. The complex also contains the biggest tennis stadium in the world, the Arthur Ashe Stadium. The Riverhead Raceway in eastern Long Island hosts NASCAR Whelen Modified Tour races and other regional events.

Long Island also has two horse racing tracks, Aqueduct Racetrack in Ozone Park, Queens and Belmont Park on the Queens/Nassau border in Elmont, home of the Belmont Stakes. The longest dirt thoroughbred racecourse in the world is also at Belmont Park. Another category of sporting events popular in this region involves firematic racing events, involving many local volunteer fire departments.

==== Notable sports teams ====
Club	City	Sport	Founded	League	Venue(s)	Championships
Brooklyn Nets	Brooklyn	Basketball	1967	National Basketball Association	Barclays Center	2 (1974, 1976)
New York City FC	Queens (future)	Soccer	2015	Major League Soccer	Etihad Park (opens in 2027)	1 (2021)
New York Islanders	Elmont	Ice hockey	1972	National Hockey League	UBS Arena	4 (1980, 1981, 1982, 1983)
New York Mets	Queens	Baseball	1962	Major League Baseball	Citi Field	2 (1969, 1986)
New York Liberty	Brooklyn	Basketball	1997	Women’s National Basketball Association	Barclays Center	1 (2024)
Gotham FC	Queens (future)	Soccer	2006	National Women’s Soccer League	Etihad Park	0
MI New York	Queens	Cricket	2023	Major League Cricket	Texas/California Hubs	1 (2023, 2025)
Brooklyn FC	Brooklyn	Soccer	2024	USL Super League	Maimonides Park	0
Brooklyn FC	Brooklyn	Soccer	2026	USL Championship	Maimonides Park	0

==== Minor league sports teams ====
Club	City	Sport	Founded	League	Venue(s)	Championships
Brooklyn Cyclones	Brooklyn	Baseball	1986	South Atlantic League	Maimonides Park	2 (1986, 2001)
Long Island Nets	Uniondale	Basketball	2015	NBA G League	Nassau Veterans Memorial Coliseum	0
Long Island Ducks	Islip	Baseball	2000	Atlantic League	Fairfield Properties Ballpark	4 (2004, 2012, 2013, 2019)
Long Island Rough Riders	Uniondale	Soccer	1994	USL League Two	Hofstra University Soccer Stadium	0
Long Island Rough Riders (women)	Uniondale	Soccer	1994	USL W League	Mitchel Athletic Complex	0
The Island F.C.	Uniondale	Soccer	2025	MLS NEXT Pro	Mitchel Athletic Complex	0
USL Long Island	Hempstead	Soccer	2026	USL League One	James M. Shuart Stadium	0

== Transportation ==
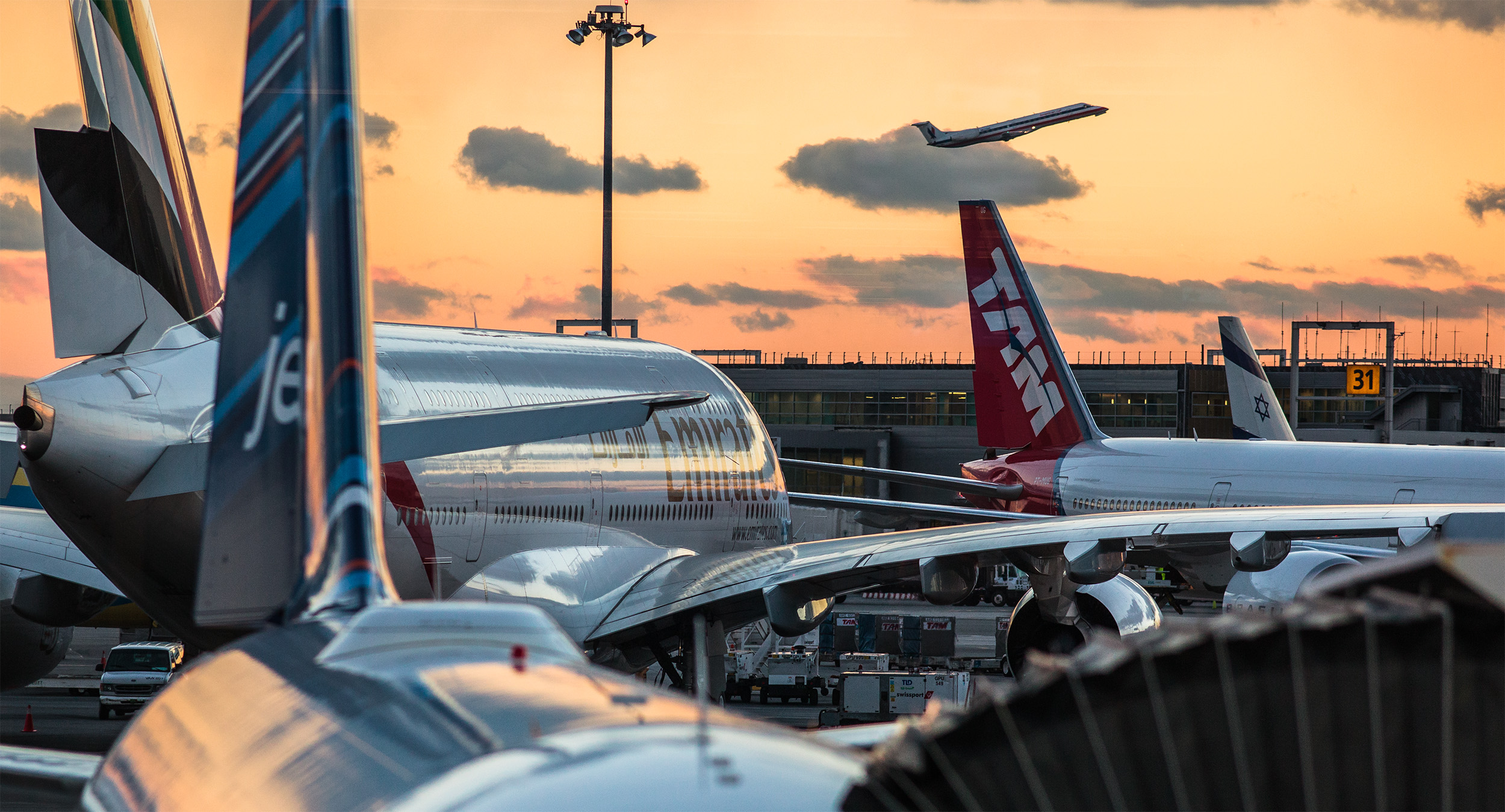
John F. Kennedy Airport in Queens, the busiest international air passenger gateway to the United States in January 2013

Many major forms of transportation serve Long Island, including aviation via John F. Kennedy International Airport, LaGuardia Airport, and Long Island MacArthur Airport, and multiple smaller airports; rail transportation via the Long Island Rail Road and the New York City Subway; bus routes via MTA Regional Bus Operations, Nassau Inter-County Express, and Suffolk County Transit; ferry service via NYC Ferry and multiple smaller ferry companies; and several major highways. There are historic and modern bridges, and recreational and commuter trails, serving various parts of Long Island.

There are eleven road crossings out of Long Island, all but one providing Brooklyn-Manhattan, Queens-Manhattan, and Queens-Bronx connections across the East River, with the Triborough Bridge providing two connections from Queens, one each to Manhattan and the Bronx. The single non-East River crossing is the Verrazzano–Narrows Bridge, connecting Brooklyn to Staten Island across The Narrows. Plans for a Long Island Sound link at locations in Nassau and Suffolk counties (a proposed bridge or tunnel that would link Long Island to the south with Westchester County, New York or Connecticut to the north across Long Island Sound) have been discussed for decades, but there are no plans to construct such a crossing.

=== Public transportation ===
The Metropolitan Transportation Authority operates mass transportation for the New York metropolitan area including all five boroughs of New York City, the suburban counties of Dutchess, Nassau, Orange, Putnam, Rockland, Suffolk, and Westchester, all of which together are the "Metropolitan Commuter Transportation District (MCTD)".

The MTA considers itself to be the largest regional public transportation provider in the Western Hemisphere. As of 2018, MTA agencies move about 8.6 million customers per day (translating to 2.65 billion rail and bus customers a year). The MTA's systems carry over 11 million passengers on an average weekday systemwide, and over 850,000 vehicles on its seven toll bridges and two tunnels per weekday.

==== Rail ====
A schematic map of the Long Island Rail Road system

The Long Island Rail Road (LIRR) is North America's busiest commuter railroad system, carrying an average of 282,400 passengers each weekday on 728 daily trains. Chartered on April 24, 1834, and operating continuously since, it is also the oldest railroad in the U.S. that still operates under its original charter and name. The Metropolitan Transportation Authority has operated the LIRR as one of its two commuter railroads since 1966, and the LIRR is one of the few railroads worldwide that provides service all the time, year round. A $2 billion plan to add a third railroad track to the LIRR Main Line between the Floral Park and Hicksville stations in Nassau County was completed in 2022, and an expansion of the Ronkonkoma Branch from one to two tracks was completed in 2018. Five "readiness projects" across the LIRR system, which cost a combined $495 million, were built in preparation for expanded peak-hour LIRR service after the completion of East Side Access, which brings LIRR trains to Grand Central Madison in Manhattan.

==== Bus ====
Nassau Inter-County Express (NICE) provides bus service in Nassau County, while Suffolk County Transit, an agency of the Suffolk County government, provides bus service in Suffolk County. In 2012, NICE replaced the former MTA's Long Island Bus in transporting Long Islanders across Nassau County while allowing them to use MTA MetroCards as payment.

=== Roads ===
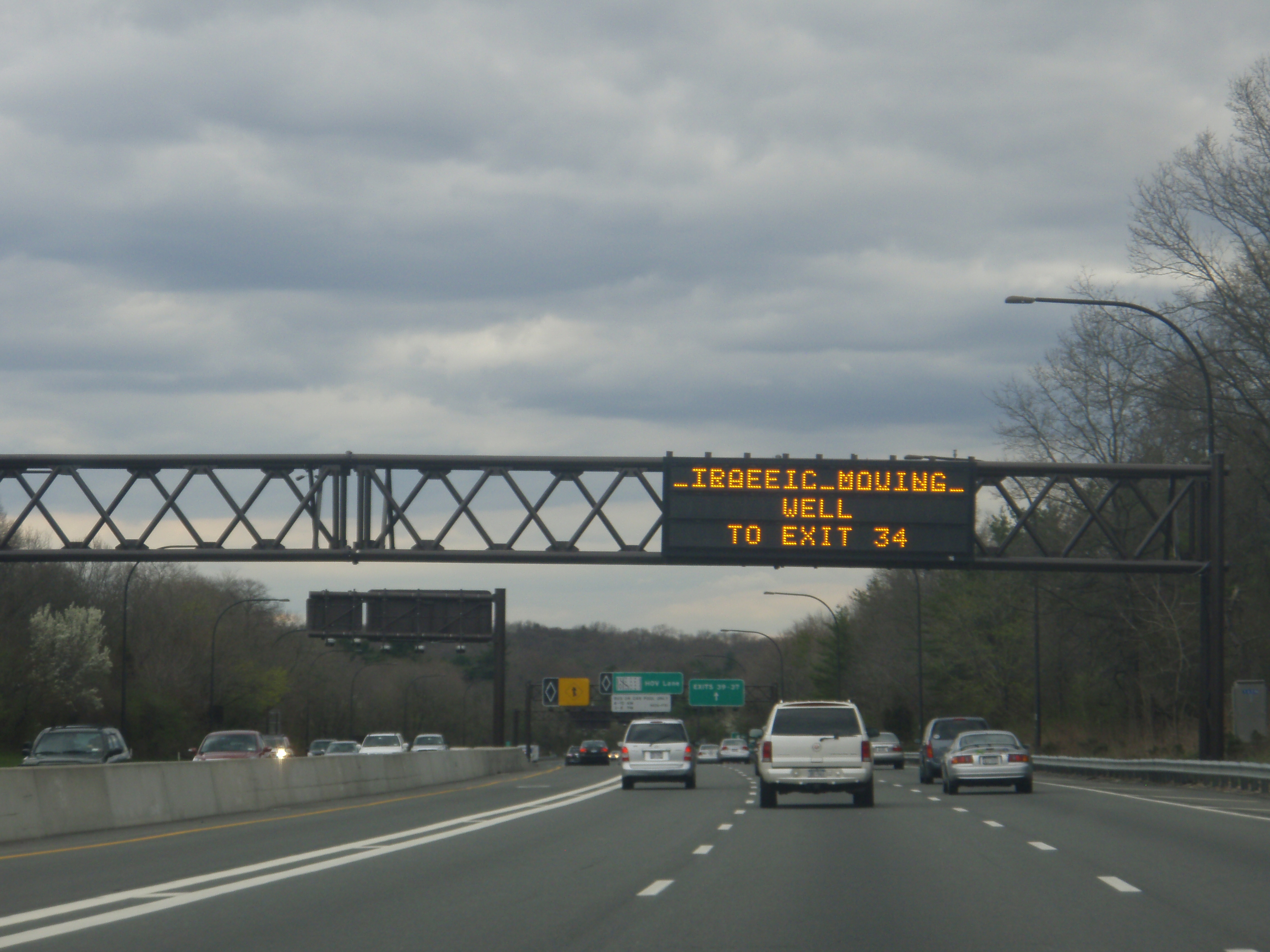
Long Island Expressway, sometimes referred to as the "world's longest parking lot" because of its heavy traffic, in Nassau County

The Long Island Expressway, Northern State Parkway, and Southern State Parkway, all products of the automobile-centered planning of Robert Moses, are the island's primary east–west high-speed controlled-access highways.

Major roads of Long Island
Direction	Route shield	Name
**West-East**		**Nassau Expressway northern section**
**West-East**		Montauk Highway
**West-East**		**Sunrise Highway***
**West-East**		**Belt Parkway** / **Southern State Parkway**
**West-East**		Hempstead Turnpike
**West-East**		Babylon–Farmingdale Turnpike
**West-East**		**Grand Central Parkway** / **Northern State Parkway**
**West-East**		**Long Island Expressway**
**West-East**		Jericho Turnpike/Middle Country Road
**West-East**		Northern Boulevard
**South-North**		**Brooklyn-Queens Expressway**
**South-North**		**Van Wyck Expressway**
**South-North**		Nassau Expressway southern section
**South-North**		**Clearview Expressway**
**South-North**		**Cross Island Parkway**
**South-North**		**Meadowbrook State Parkway**
**South-North**		**Wantagh State Parkway**
**South-North**		Newbridge Road
**South-North**		Cedar Swamp Road/Broadway/Hicksville Road
**South-North**		**Seaford-Oyster Bay Expressway**
**South-North**		Broad Hollow Road
**South-North**		Deer Park Avenue
**South-North**		**Robert Moses Causeway**
**South-North**		**Sagtikos State Parkway**
**South-North**		**Sunken Meadow State Parkway**
**South-North**		Islip Avenue
**South-North**		Nicolls Road
**South-North**		**William Floyd Parkway**
Roads in **boldface** are limited-access roads. Sunrise Highway is only limited-access from western Suffolk County eastwards.

==== Ground transportation ====
Several hundred transportation companies service the Long Island and New York City areas. Winston Airport Shuttle, the oldest of these companies in business since 1973, was the first to introduce door-to-door shared-ride service to and from the major airports, which almost all transportation companies now use.

== See also ==
- Coastal Connecticut
- Geography of New York City
- Jersey Shore
- List of films shot on Long Island
- List of Long Island recreational facilities
- List of tallest buildings on Long Island
- Long Island (proposed state)
- Timeline of town creation in Downstate New York
- Long Island Sound
- Fire Island
