= South Shore (Long Island) =

Southern edge of Long Island in New York state

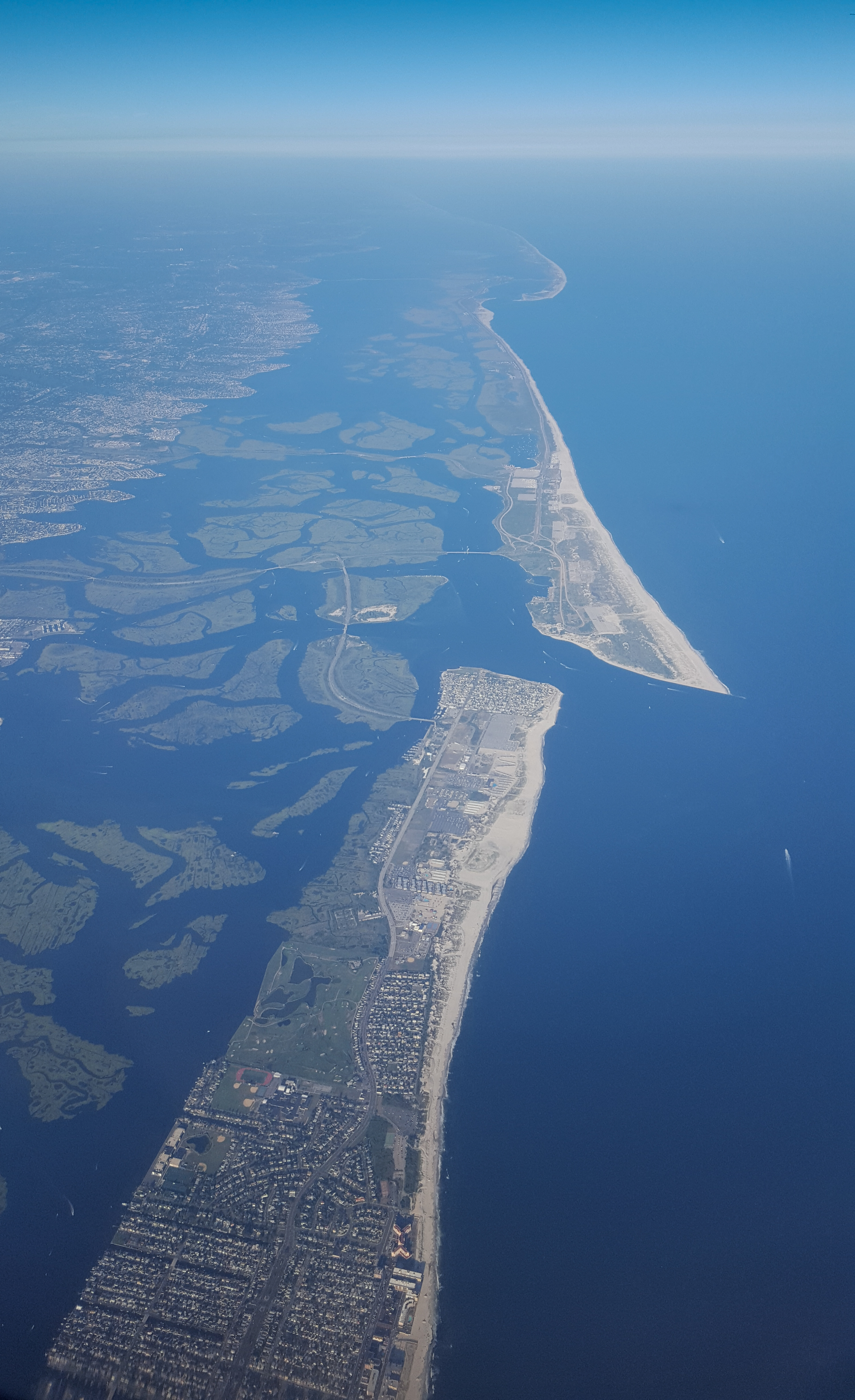
An aerial view of the Barrier Islands along the South Shore of Long Island in August 2016

The South Shore of Long Island, in the U.S. state of New York, is the area along Long Island's Atlantic Ocean shoreline.

== Description ==
Though some consider the South Shore to include parts of Queens, particularly the beach communities in the Rockaways such as Belle Harbor, the term is generally used to refer to the Long Island coastline in Nassau and Suffolk counties. It is often used as a generic name for the entire southern half of Long Island rather than just the area immediately adjacent to the coastline.

The South Shore tends to be diverse in culture and income as it varies from one hamlet or village to another. In Suffolk County, there still remain pockets of old money from the Gilded Age, including the country seats of families from the Vanderbilts, Havemeyers, and others.

The South Shore is also home to the seaside resort of The Hamptons on its east end, located on the South Fork of Long Island. On its west end, bordering Queens, the Five Towns retains pockets of affluence similar in character to the Gold Coast of the North Shore and The Hamptons.

== South Shore communities ==
- Amityville
- Atlantic Beach
- Babylon
- Baldwin
- Baldwin Harbor
- Bay Shore
- Bayport
- Bellmore
- Bellport
- Bethpage
- Blue Point
- Bohemia
- Brentwood
- Brightwaters
- Cedarhurst
- Center Moriches
- Central Islip
- Cherry Grove
- Copiague
- Copiague Harbor
- Deer Park
- East Islip
- East Moriches
- East Patchogue
- East Rockaway
- East Quogue
- Eastport
- Elmont
- Farmingdale
- Five Towns
- Freeport
- Gilgo Beach
- Great River
- Hewlett
- Holbrook
- Inwood
- Island Park
- Islip
- Islip Terrace
- Kismet
- Lawrence
- Levittown
- Lido Beach
- Lindenhurst
- Long Beach
- Lynbrook
- Malverne
- Massapequa
- Massapequa Park
- Mastic
- Mastic Beach
- Medford
- Merrick
- Moriches
- North Amityville
- North Babylon
- North Bellmore
- North Bellport
- North Lindenhurst
- North Massapequa
- North Merrick
- North Valley Stream
- Oak Beach
- Oakdale
- Oceanside
- Patchogue
- Point Lookout
- Rockville Centre
- Ronkonkoma
- Roosevelt
- Sayville
- Seaford
- Shirley
- Valley Stream
- Wantagh
- West Babylon
- West Gilgo Beach
- West Islip
- West Sayville
- Woodmere
- Wyandanch

== Beaches ==
In approximate west to east order:

- Atlantic Beach
- Long Beach
- Lido Beach
- Jones Beach State Park
- Tobay Beach
- Gilgo State Park
- Robert Moses State Park
- Fire Island
- Smith Point County Park
- West Hampton Dunes
- Quogue
- Southampton
- East Hampton
- Hither Hills State Park
- Montauk Point State Park
