= Oyster Bay, New York =

- Town
- Town of Oyster Bay
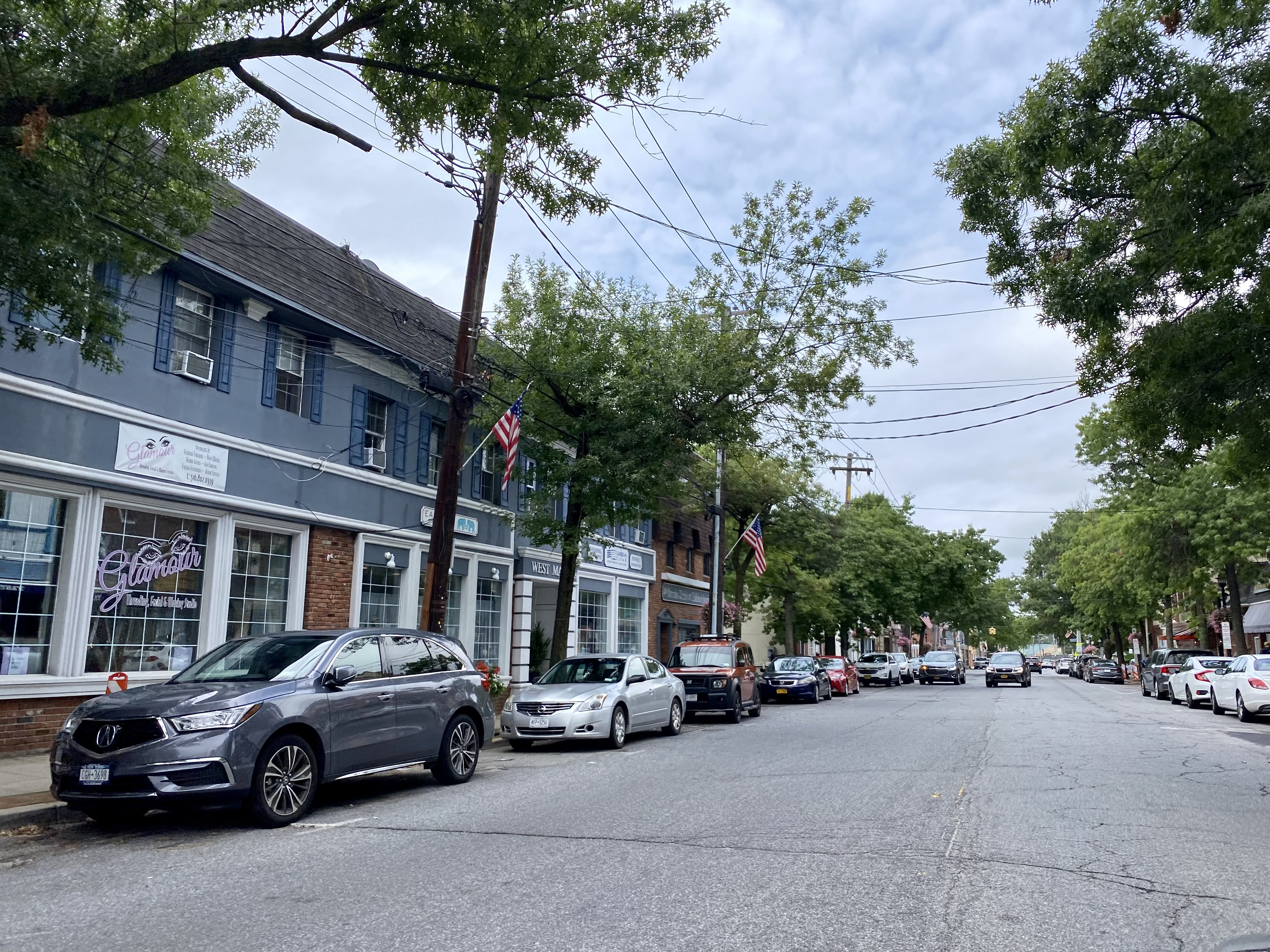
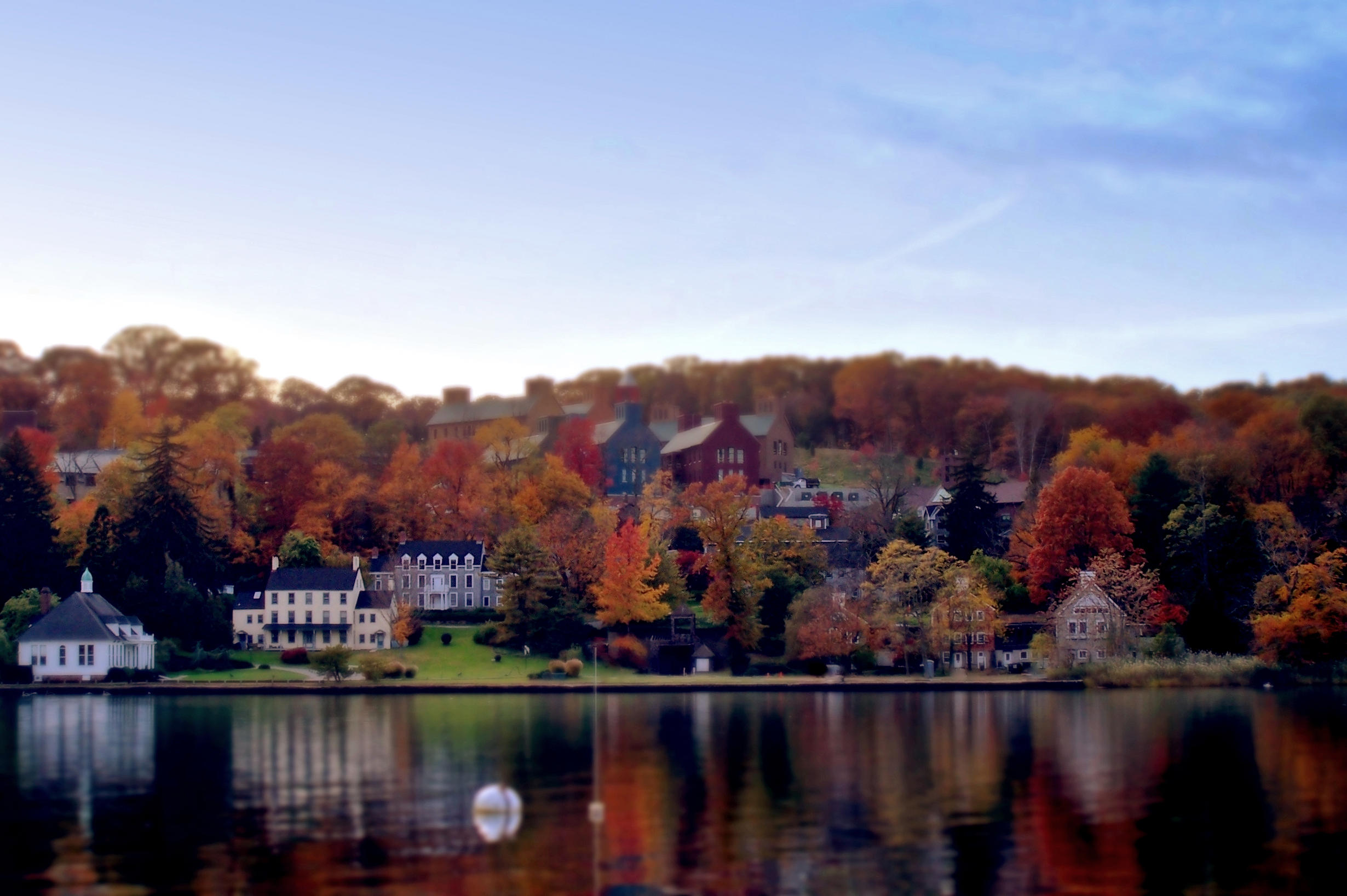
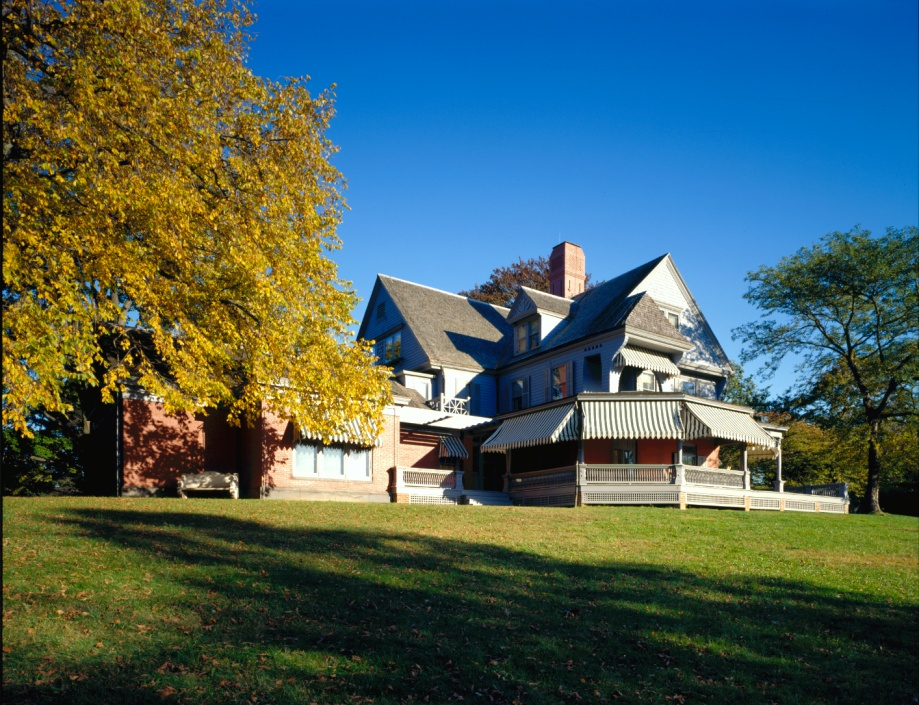
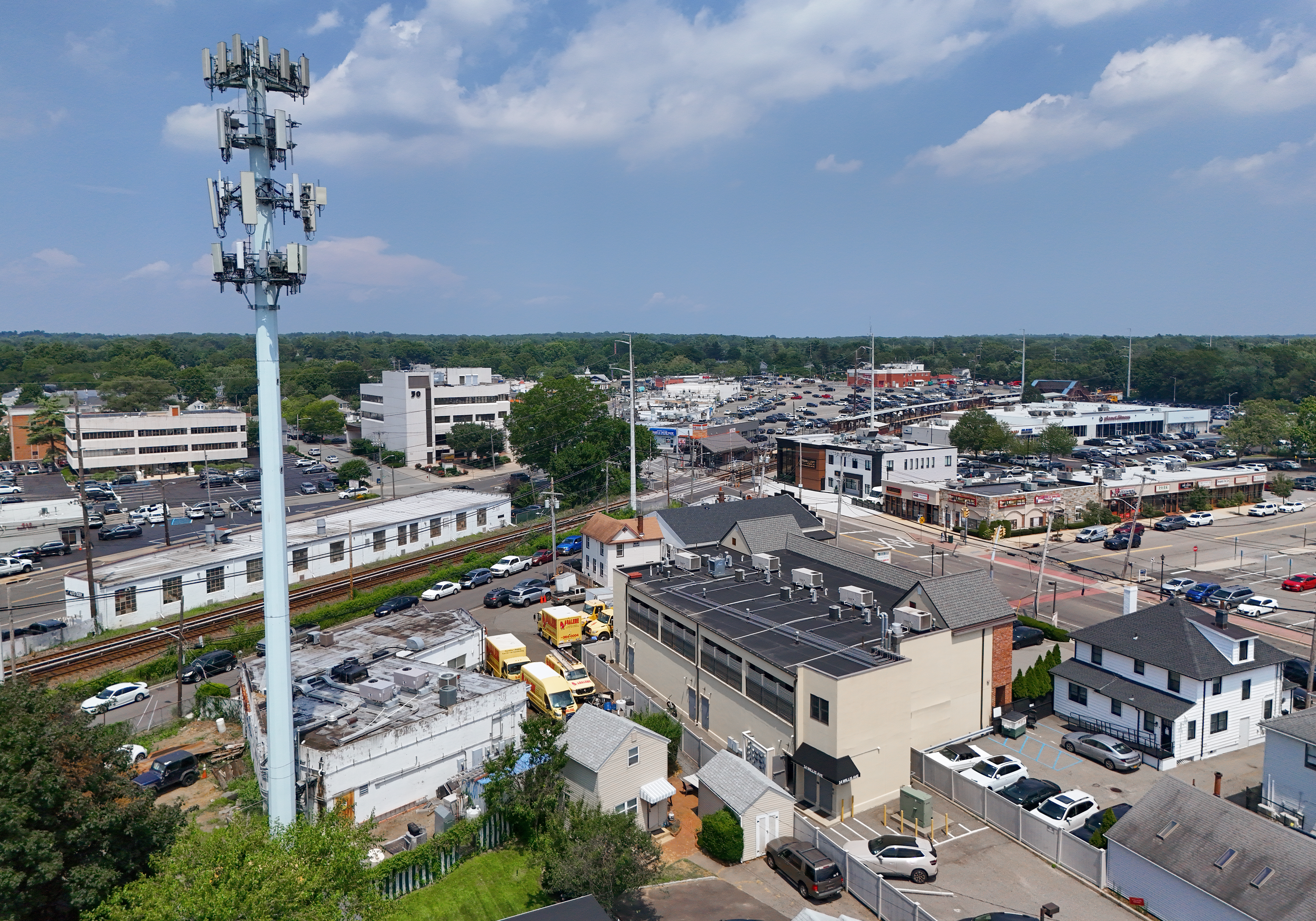
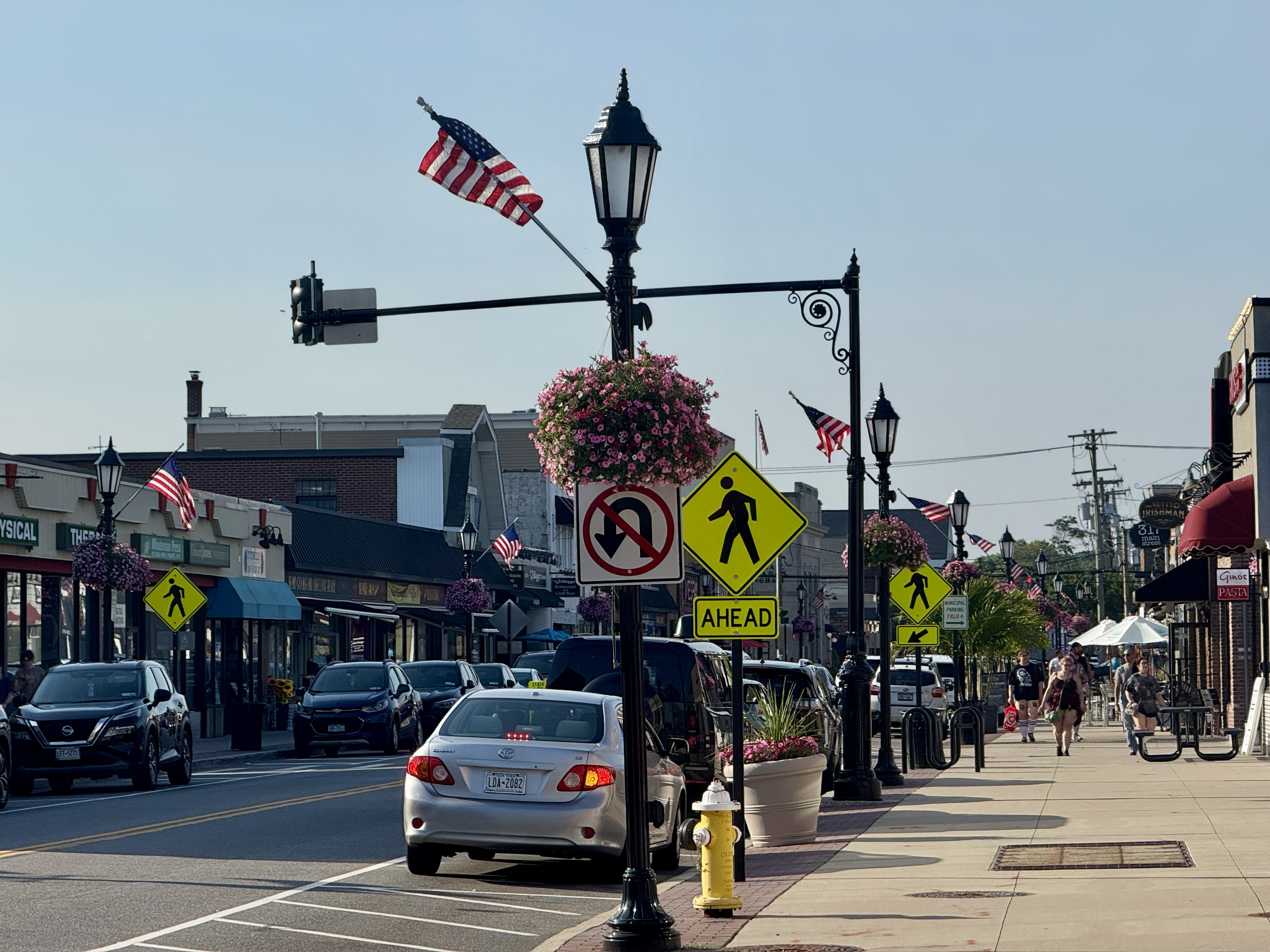
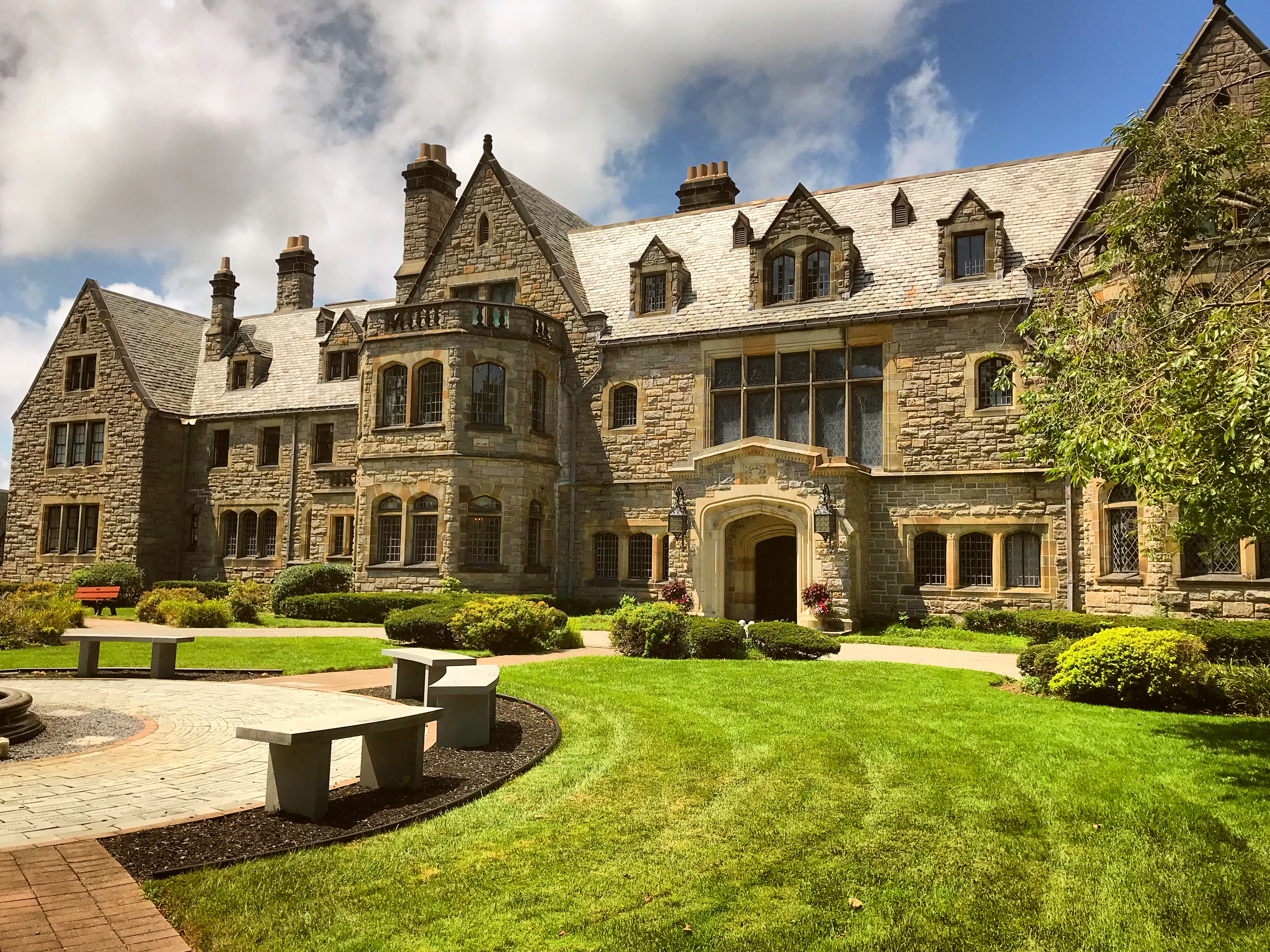
- From left to right: Downtown Oyster Bay; Cold Spring Harbor Laboratory; Sagamore Hill National Historic Site; Downtown Syosset; Main Street in Farmingdale; and Mill Neck Manor

- Flag Seal
- Nicknames: TOBAY; ToB
- Location in the state of New York and Nassau County.
- Coordinates: 40°45′34″N 73°30′10″W
- Country: United States
- State: New York
- County: Nassau
- First settled: 1653; 373 years ago
- Incorporated as a town: 1687; 339 years ago

Government
  - Type: Town Council
  - Town Supervisor: Joseph S. Saladino (R)
  - Town Council: Members' List: • Michele M. Johnson (R); • Louis B. Imbroto (R); • Thomas Hand (R); • Steve Labriola (R); • Laura Maier (R); • Vicki Walsh (R)

Area
  - Total: 169.39 sq mi (438.73 km^{2})
  - Land: 103.74 sq mi (268.69 km^{2})
  - Water: 65.65 sq mi (170.04 km^{2}) 38.75%
- Elevation: 180 ft (55 m)

Population (2020)
  - Total: 301,332
  - Density: 2,904.6/sq mi (1,121.5/km^{2})
- Time zone: UTC−5 (EST)
  - Summer (DST): UTC−4 (EDT)
- Area codes: 516, 363
- FIPS code: 36-56000
- GNIS feature ID: 0979336
- Website: www.oysterbaytown.com

The Town of Oyster Bay is the easternmost of the three towns that make up Nassau County, New York, United States. Part of the New York metropolitan area, it is the only town in Nassau County to extend from the North Shore to the South Shore of Long Island. As of the 2020 census, it had a population of 301,332, making it the 5th most populous city or town in the state.

There are 18 villages and 18 hamlets within the town of Oyster Bay. The United States Postal Service has organized these 36 places into 30 five-digit ZIP Codes, served by 20 post offices. Each post office shares the name of one of the hamlets or villages, but their boundaries are usually not coterminous.

Oyster Bay is also the name of a hamlet on the North Shore, within the town of Oyster Bay. Near this hamlet, in the village of Cove Neck, is Sagamore Hill, the former residence and summer White House of U.S. president Theodore Roosevelt and now a museum. At least six of the 36 villages and hamlets of the town have shores on Oyster Bay Harbor, an inlet of Long Island Sound, and many of these at one time or another have also been referred to as being part of the hamlet of Oyster Bay.

== History ==
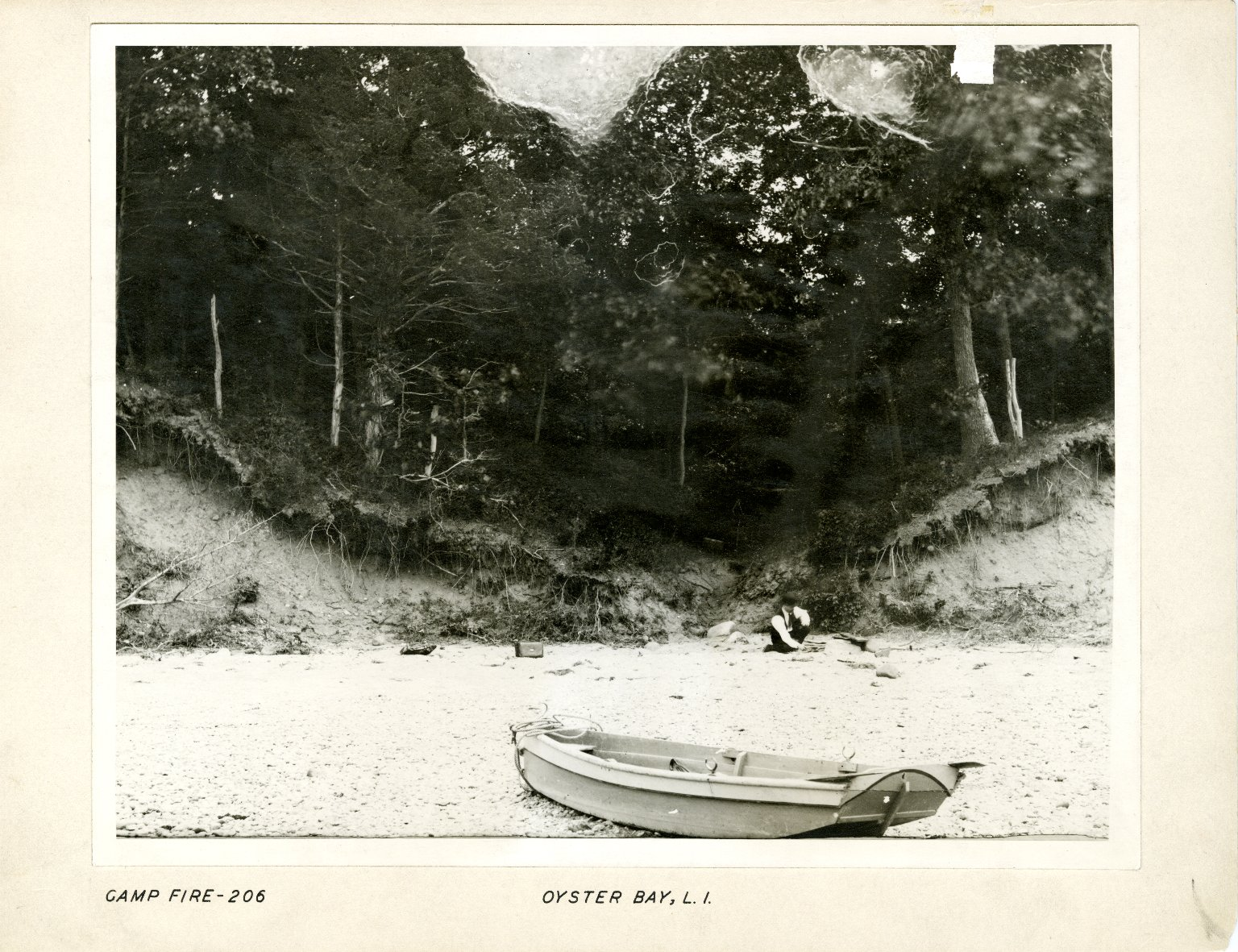
George Bradford Brainerd (American, 1845–1887). Camp Fire, Oyster Bay, Long Island, ca. 1872–1887. Collodion silver glass wet plate negative. Brooklyn Museum

Succeeding cultures of indigenous peoples had lived in the area for thousands of years. At the time of European contact, the Lenape (Delaware) nation inhabited western Long Island. By 1600 the band inhabiting the local area was called the Matinecock after their location, but they were Lenape people.

Following European colonization, the area became part of the colony of New Netherland. In 1639, the Dutch West India Company made its first purchase of land on Long Island from the local Native Americans. The English also had colonies on Long Island at this time. The Dutch did not dispute English claims to what is now Suffolk County, but when settlers from New England arrived in (present-day) Oyster Bay in 1640, they were soon arrested as part of a boundary dispute. In 1643, Englishmen purchased land in the present-day town of Hempstead from the Indians that included land purchased by the Dutch in 1639. Nevertheless, in 1644, the Dutch director granted a patent for Hempstead to the English.

The Dutch also granted other English settlements in Flushing, Newtown, and Jamaica. In 1650, the Treaty of Hartford established a boundary between Dutch and English claims at "Oysterbay", by which the Dutch meant present-day Cold Spring Harbor (to the east) and the English meant all of the water connected to present-day Oyster Bay Harbor. Meanwhile, the government of England came under the control of Oliver Cromwell as a republic, and smugglers took advantage of the unresolved border dispute. In 1653, English settlers made their first purchase of land in Oyster Bay from the local Matinecock tribe, though there were already some rogue English settlements there. For this purchase, the English settlers paid to the Native American Moheness (aka Assiapum), "six kettles, six fathoms of wampum, six hoes, six hatchets, three pairs of stockings, thirty awl-blades or muxes, twenty knives, three shirts and as much Peague as will amount to four pounds sterling." The monarchy was restored in England in 1660, and in 1664 King Charles gave Long Island (and much else) to his brother James, leading to the Dutch relinquishing control of all of New Amsterdam.

In 1667 the settlement at Oyster Bay received its charter from the new English colony of New York, becoming the Township of Oyster Bay. By 1687, the last piece of land was sold by the Indians, and few remained by 1709.

The Census of slaves, conducted in the Province of New York in 1755, contains a long list of enslaved individuals in Oyster Bay, including the hamlets of Jericho and what is now North Hempstead. It is followed by a remarkable additional list of "free Negroes Melattoes [people of Afro-European ancestry] and Mustees [people of Afro-Indigenous ancestry] Resideing within ye Township of Oysterbay that may probably Be Likely In case of Insurrections To be as Mischevious as ye Slaves." (Free individuals were not supposed to be reported for the Census; a local militia captain supplied it on his own initiative, with the expectation "that ye Other Captains in Oysterbay will acquaint Your Honour [governor of New York] of those Resideing in ye Other parts of ye Township.")

During most of the American Revolution the town was under the control of British forces.

The town was originally part of Queens County, until the western portion of that county was amalgamated into New York City in 1898 and Nassau County was created in 1899. In 1918, Glen Cove, to the west, incorporated as a city and formed a governing system separate from the town. Following World War II, housing replaced farmland as the population grew from about 40,000 in 1950 to more than 290,000 in 1990.

Oyster Bay is home to the Seawanhaka Corinthian Yacht Club, one of the oldest yacht clubs in the Western Hemisphere, which opened in 1871. There are 40 buildings and sites presently named Town of Oyster Bay Landmarks.

== Geography ==
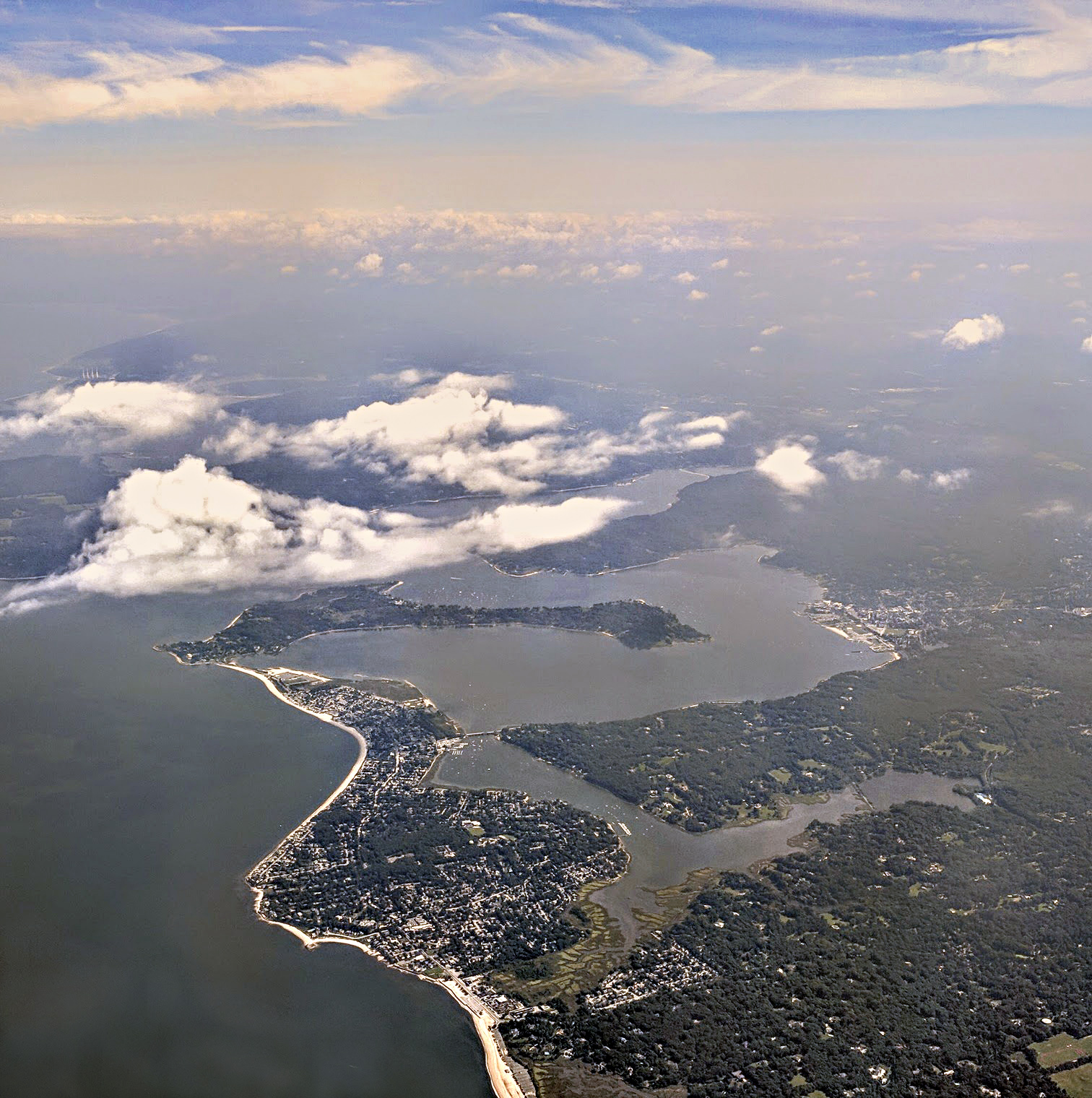
Aerial view from a plane after taking off from LaGuardia of Mill Neck Creek and Oyster Bay on the North Shore of Long Island.

The town of Oyster Bay extends from Long Island Sound in the north, south to the waters of South Oyster Bay and the Atlantic Ocean. It is bordered by the town of North Hempstead on the northwest and the town of Hempstead on the southwest. It is the easternmost of the three towns of Nassau County, with Suffolk County immediately to the east.

According to the United States Census Bureau, the town has a total area of 169.5 square miles (439 km^{2}), of which 104.4 square miles (270 km^{2}) is land and 65.1 square miles (169 km^{2}), or 38.42%, is water. As with most of Long Island, the north shore is hilly, the south shore has sandy beaches, and the area between is a plain.

Between the 1990 Census and the 2000 census, the town exchanged territory with the towns of Hempstead (Nassau County) and Babylon (Suffolk County). It also gained territory from the town of Huntington in Suffolk County.

== Demographics ==
Historical population
Census	Pop.	Note	%±
1790	4,097		—
1800	4,548		11.0%
1810	4,725		3.9%
1830	5,193		—
1840	5,865		12.9%
1850	6,900		17.6%
1860	9,168		32.9%
1870	10,595		15.6%
1880	11,923		12.5%
1890	13,870		16.3%
1900	16,334		17.8%
1910	21,802		33.5%
1920	20,296		−6.9%
1930	36,869		81.7%
1940	42,594		15.5%
1950	66,930		57.1%
1960	290,055		333.4%
1970	333,342		14.9%
1980	305,750		−8.3%
1990	292,657		−4.3%
2000	295,164		0.9%
2010	293,214		−0.7%
2020	301,332		2.8%
U.S. Decennial Census

=== Racial and ethnic composition ===
Oyster Bay town, New York – Racial and ethnic composition Note: the US Census treats Hispanic/Latino as an ethnic category. This table excludes Latinos from the racial categories and assigns them to a separate category. Hispanics/Latinos may be of any race.
Race / Ethnicity (NH = Non-Hispanic)	Pop 2000	Pop 2010	Pop 2020	% 2000	% 2010	% 2020
White alone (NH)	257,361	234,536	208,514	87.56%	79.99%	69.20%
Black or African American alone (NH)	4,595	6,168	6,650	1.56%	2.10%	2.21%
Native American or Alaska Native alone (NH)	122	210	222	0.04%	0.07%	0.07%
Asian alone (NH)	14,212	26,611	46,384	4.84%	9.08%	15.39%
Native Hawaiian or Pacific Islander alone (NH)	37	24	47	0.01%	0.01%	0.02%
Other race alone (NH)	309	497	1,409	0.11%	0.17%	0.47%
Mixed race or Multiracial (NH)	2,412	3,245	6,769	0.82%	1.11%	2.25%
Hispanic or Latino (any race)	14,877	21,923	31,337	5.06%	7.48%	10.40%
Total	293,925	293,214	301,332	100.00%	100.00%	100.00%

=== 2019 data ===
The 2019 American Community Survey determined the population was 293,576, estimating a 1.6% increase from the 2010 United States census. The racial and ethnic makeup of Oyster Bay was 75.5% non-Hispanic White, 2.3% Black or African American, 0.2% American Indian or Alaska Native, 12.5% Asian, 2.0% from two or more races, and 8.1% Hispanic or Latin American of any race.

=== 2010 census ===
As of the 2010 census the population was 85% White (80% Non-Hispanic White), 2.3% Black or African American, 0.2% Native American, 9.1% Asian, 0.0% Pacific Islander, 1.9% from other races, and 1.6% from two or more races. Hispanic or Latino of any race were 7.5% of the population.

As of the census of 2000, there were 293,925 people, 99,355 households, and 80,278 families residing in the town. The population density was 2,816.2 inhabitants per square mile (1,087.3/km^{2}). There were 101,076 housing units at an average density of 968.4 per square mile (373.9/km^{2}). The racial makeup of the town was 90.83% White, 1.64% Black or African American, 0.07% Native American, 4.85% Asian, 0.02% Pacific Islander, 1.36% from other races, and 1.23% from two or more races. Hispanic or Latino of any race were 5.06% of the population.

There were 99,355 households, out of which 36.0% had children under the age of 18 living with them, 68.9% were married couples living together, 8.9% had a female householder with no husband present, and 19.2% were non-families. 16.1% of all households were made up of individuals, and 8.5% had someone living alone who was 65 years of age or older. The average household size was 2.93 and the average family size was 3.27.

In the town, the population was spread out, with 24.5% under the age of 18, 6.0% from 18 to 24, 28.7% from 25 to 44, 24.9% from 45 to 64, and 15.9% who were 65 years of age or older. The median age was 40 years. For every 100 females, there were 94.1 males. For every 100 females age 18 and over, there were 90.6 males.

According to a 2007 estimate, the median income for a household in the town was $99,873, and the median income for a family was $115,095. Males had a median income of $60,726 versus $39,420 for females. The per capita income for the town was $35,895. About 2.0% of families and 3.3% of the population were below the poverty line, including 3.0% of those under age 18 and 4.6% of those age 65 or over.

== Economy ==
Aer Lingus operates its United States office in Oyster Bay, centered on the hamlet of Jericho. Cablevision Systems, a major cable company in the tri-state area has its corporate headquarters in Bethpage, New York, as well as a satellite office in Jericho, New York that contains its medium to large business solutions division, Lightpath. Acclaim Entertainment was originally located in the hamlet of Oyster Bay. It originally occupied a one-room office in Oyster Bay. At a later time it occupied a brick structure with two stories. In 1994 Acclaim bought a headquarters building in Glen Cove.

== Education ==
Both the State University of New York at Old Westbury and New York Institute of Technology or NYIT (and its affiliated New York Institute of Technology College of Osteopathic Medicine) are located in Old Westbury. LIU Post, the largest campus of the private Long Island University system, is located in Brookville.

== Government ==
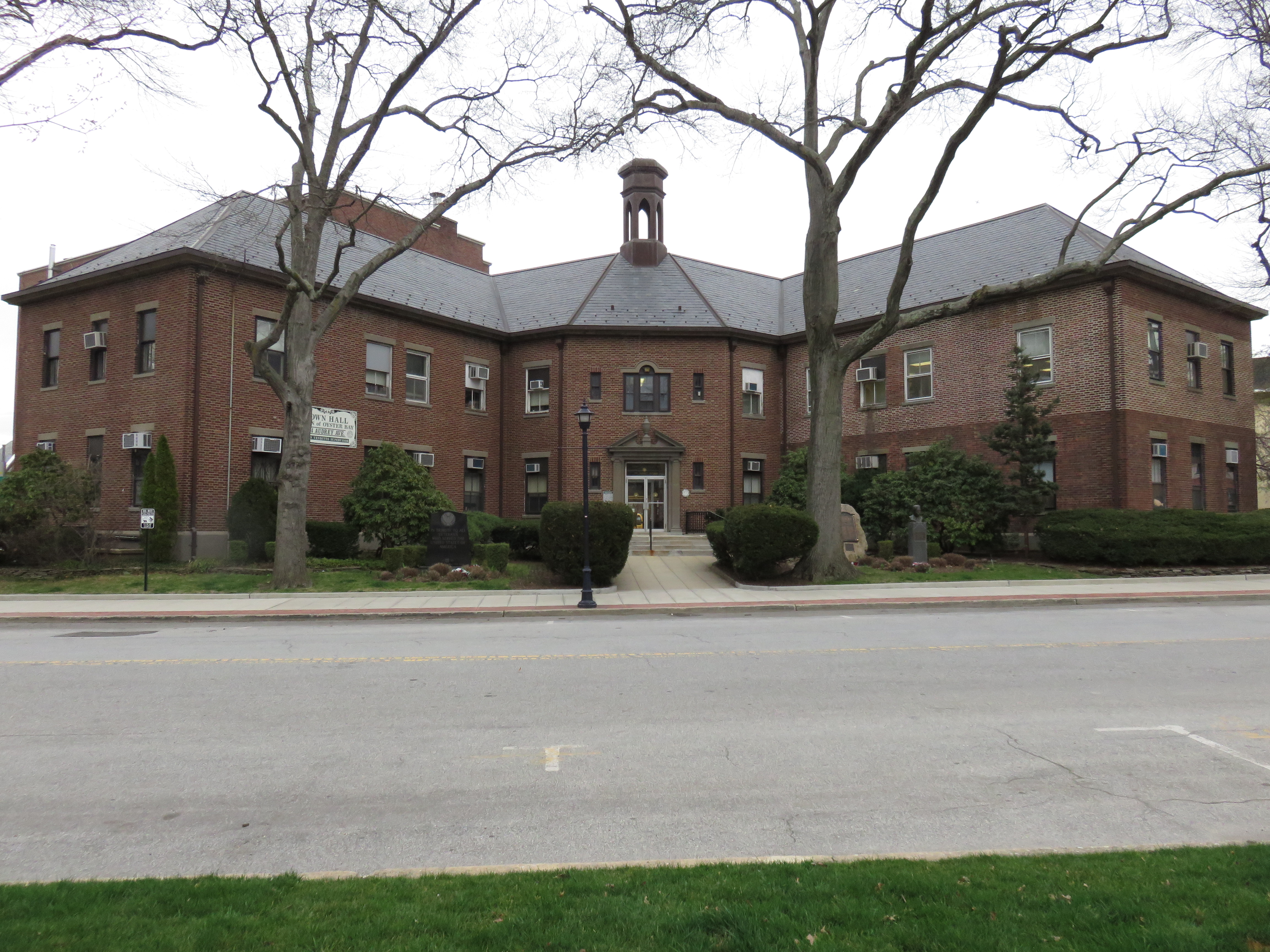
Oyster Bay Town Hall in 2016

The Town of Oyster Bay has a government comprising a town supervisor and a town council consisting of six members. Council members are elected on a town-wide basis, and there are no election districts within the town. Two other elected positions are town clerk and receiver of taxes. At one point, the town had its own police force, but it no longer does.

In New York, a town is a major division within a county. Larger towns may contain a number of named incorporated villages that provides numerous local services to the village residents. Towns may contain named unincorporated hamlets, governed and administered by the town council.

=== Villages (incorporated) ===
The Town of Oyster Bay contains all or part of 20 incorporated villages:

1. Bayville (1919)
2. Brookville (1931)
3. Centre Island (1926)
4. Cove Neck (1927)
5. East Hills (1931) (mostly in North Hempstead)
6. Farmingdale (1904)
7. Lattingtown (1931)
8. Laurel Hollow (1926)
9. Massapequa Park (1931)
10. Matinecock (1928)
11. Mill Neck (1925)
12. Muttontown (1931)
13. Old Brookville (1929)
14. Old Westbury (1924) (partial, with North Hempstead)
15. Oyster Bay Cove (1931)
16. Roslyn Harbor (1931) (mostly in North Hempstead)
17. Sea Cliff (1883) (Note: Sea Cliff: a small portion within the town of Oyster Bay that is not part of this village has the same ZIP code as the village.)
18. Upper Brookville (1932)

=== Hamlets (unincorporated) ===
The town of Oyster Bay also contains all or part of 17 unincorporated hamlets:

1. Bethpage
2. East Massapequa
3. East Norwich
4. Glen Head
5. Glenwood Landing (portion in North Hempstead)
6. Greenvale (mostly in North Hempstead)
7. Hicksville
8. Jericho
9. Locust Grove (located within the Syosset CDP)
10. Locust Valley
11. Massapequa
12. North Massapequa (Note: A small portion of Massapequa has the same ZIP code as Seaford, which is in the town of Hempstead.)
13. Old Bethpage
14. Oyster Bay
15. Plainedge
16. Plainview
17. South Farmingdale
18. Syosset
19. Woodbury

There are also a few areas that are not part of any incorporated village or census-designated place:

- A small area between Bayville and Lattingtown that contains Stehli Town Beach and a housing subdivision
- A small area between Old Westbury and Jericho that contains an undeveloped part of the SUNY Old Westbury campus
- Jones Beach Island and nearby uninhabited islands in South Oyster Bay

== Transportation ==
=== Rail lines ===
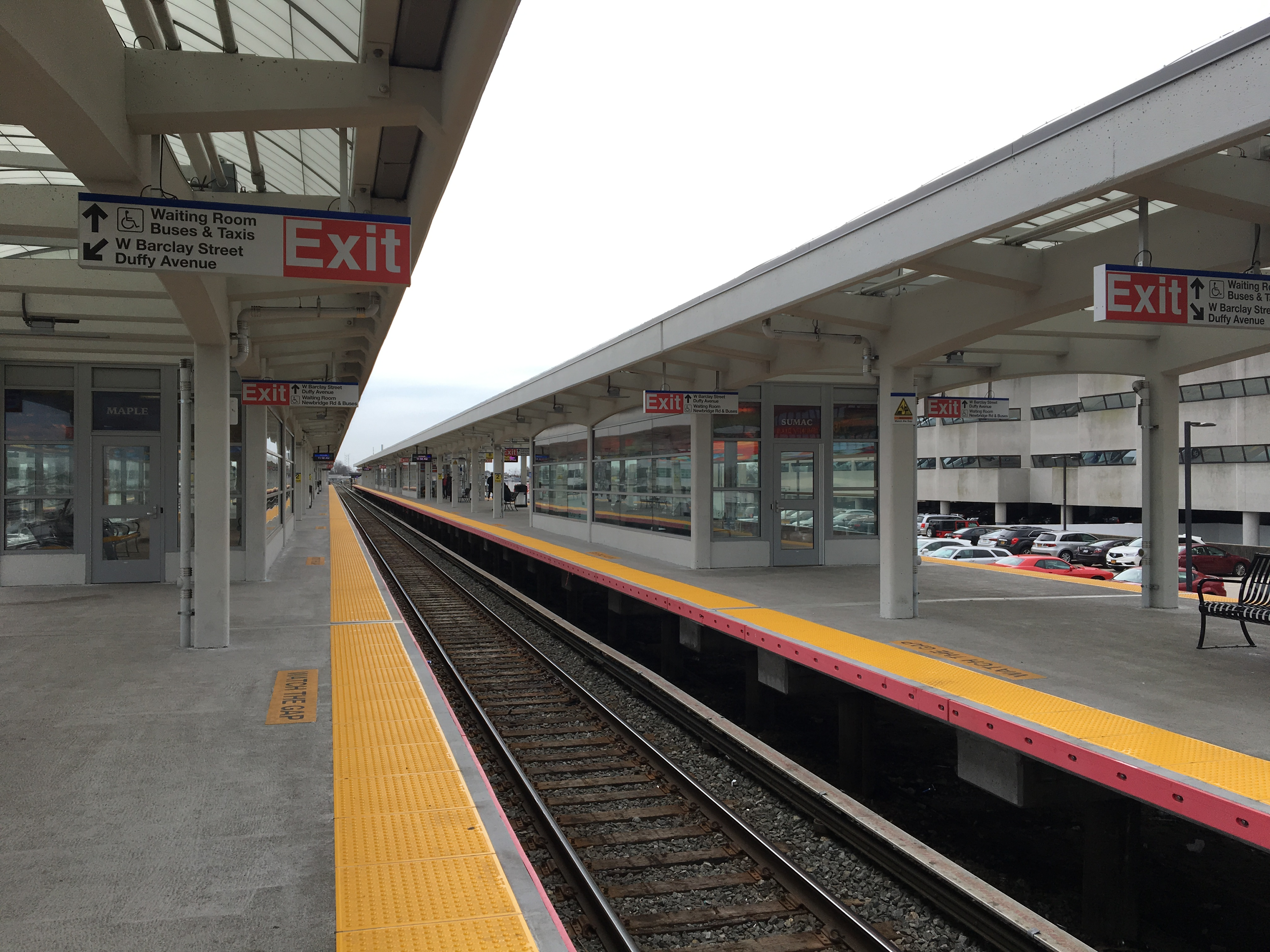
The Hicksville LIRR station in 2019

The Long Island Rail Road's Oyster Bay Branch serves the town's vicinity from Glen Head to Oyster Bay. The Main Line runs through the center of the town with stations in Hicksville, and Bethpage. The Port Jefferson Branch begins at Hicksville, and goes through Hicksville and Syosset. Rail freight service also exists along the Central Branch which begins in Bethpage. Further south in the town, the Babylon Branch runs from Seaford to the Suffolk County Line with stations in Massapequa and Massapequa Park.

=== Bus service ===
The Town of Oyster Bay is served primarily by Nassau Inter-County Express bus routes, though some routes from Suffolk County Transit also enter the town from the east.

=== Major roads ===
- Interstate 495 is the Long Island Expressway, and the sole interstate highway in the Town of Oyster Bay, with interchanges from Exits 40 in Jericho to part of Exit 48 in Plainview near the Nassau-Suffolk County Line.
- Northern State Parkway is a suburban continuation of the Grand Central Parkway that has interchanges from Exit 35 in Jericho to Exit 38 in Woodbury. The route runs along the south side of the Long Island Expressway until Exit 37A, where it crosses the expressway and moves to the north side. As a parkway, no trucks are allowed.
- Bethpage State Parkway A one-lane south-to-north parkway spanning from Southern State Parkway to Bethpage State Park that was proposed for expansion into the Northern State Parkway.
- Southern State Parkway cuts through the southern portion of the town from in North Massapequa at Exits 29, 30, and 31. The rest of the road runs between the borders of South Farmingdale, and East Massapequa before finally crossing the Nassau-Suffolk County Line.
- Ocean Parkway is an at-grade parkway spanning almost the entirety of Jones Beach Island and completely dominating that island within the Town of Oyster Bay. After leaving Jones Beach State Park territory, it serves Tobay Beach before crossing the Nassau-Suffolk line in West Gilgo Beach.
- New York State Route 24
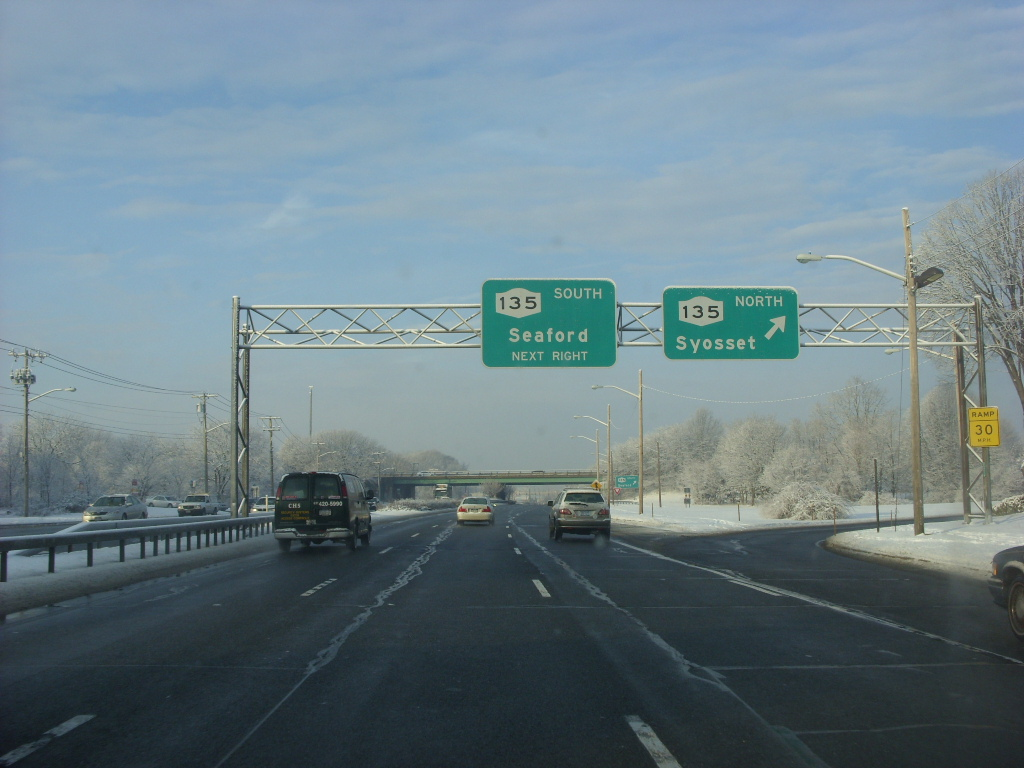
  Westbound NY 24 at its interchange with NY 135 in Plainedge in 2009
- New York State Route 25A
- New York State Route 25
- Old Country Road
- New York State Route 27
- Merrick Road
- New York State Route 27A
- New York State Route 105
- New York State Route 106
- New York State Route 107
- New York State Route 109
- New York State Route 135

== Notable people ==
- Carter F. Bales (1938–2019), co-founder, chairman and managing partner of NewWorld Capital Group, LLC
- John Barry (1933–2011), Academy and Grammy Award-winning film composer (died at his home here on January 30, 2011)
- Nicholas Braun (1988-), Emmy-nominated actor known for his role in the HBO series Succession
- Oleg Cassini (1913–2006), fashion designer
- Marie Colvin (1956–2012), award-winning reporter (killed by shelling at Homs, Syria, February 2012)
- David Cory, writer of fifty children's books
- Anna Drezen, comedian and former head writer at Saturday Night Live
- John Gotti Jr. (1964–), former boss of the Gambino crime family
- Sean Hannity (1961–), conservative media personality, host of Hannity on Fox News, lives in Centre Island
- Thomas Hopkins (1616–1684), early settler
- Dan Ingram (1934–2018), Radio Hall of Fame member best known as a disc jockey at WABC and CBS-FM Radio from the 1960s through the 2000s
- Steve Israel (1958–), former US House Representative
- Billy Joel (1949–), singer-songwriter and owner of a custom motorcycle shop called 20th Century Cycles
- Brian Kilmeade of Fox News; raised and currently resides in Massapequa
- Adrienne King, actress
- Ken Labanowski (1959-), American-Israeli basketball player
- Kate McKinnon (1984-), former Saturday Night Live cast member
- Rupert Murdoch owner of Fox News, New York Post, Wall Street Journal, and other media companies; lives in Centre Island
- Thomas Pynchon (1937–), National Book Award-winning novelist
- Ken Rosenthal (1962-), sportswriter and field reporter for Major League Baseball television broadcasts
- Theodore Roosevelt (1858–1919), 26th President of the United States
- Henry Norris Russell (1877–1957), dean of American astronomers, professor at Princeton University
- Tyce Thompson (1999– ), ice hockey player for the New Jersey Devils
- John Townsend (1608-1668), one of the signers of the Flushing Remonstrance
- Robert Townsend (1753–1838), part of Culper Spy Ring used by George Washington to help sway the American Revolution in the colonists' favor
- Micah Townshend (1749–1832), former Secretary of State of Vermont
- Ryan Tveter (1994-), racing driver
- Charles Wang (1944–2018), Chinese-American businessman; minority owner of the New York Islanders hockey team

== See also ==
- List of towns in New York
- Hempstead, New York
- North Hempstead, New York
