= Tobay Beach =

Beach in Nassau County, New York

Coordinates: 40.61107°N 73.42985°W

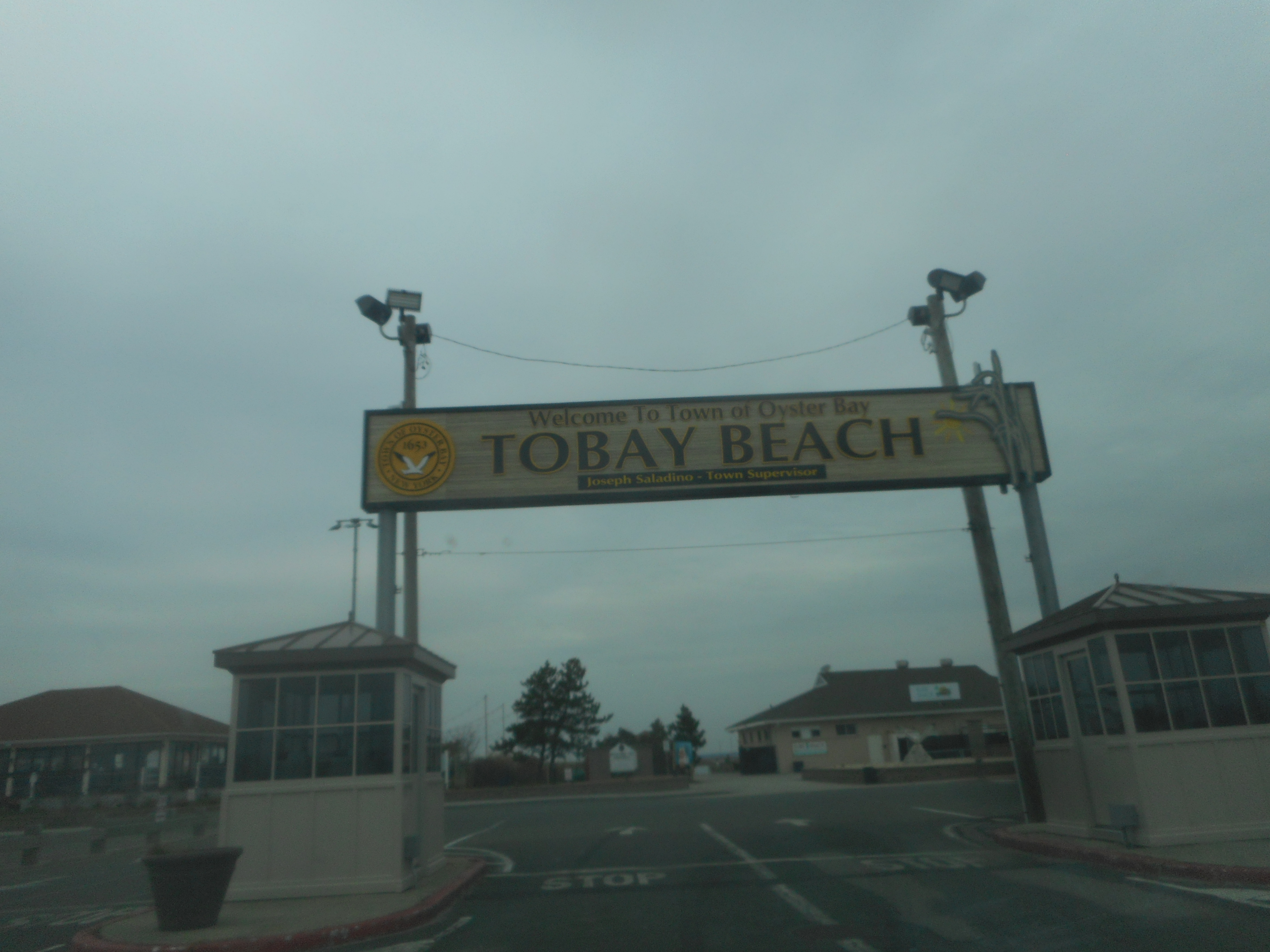
- Sign for one of the toll booths of Tobay Beach in November 2021.
- Interactive map of Tobay Beach
- Type: Beach
- Location: Jones Beach Island, Nassau County, New York, United States
- Owner: Town of Oyster Bay
- Operator: Town of Oyster Bay
- Website: oysterbaytown.com/tobay/

Tobay Beach is a restricted access recreational beach located in the middle of Jones Beach Island, a barrier island off the South Shore of Long Island, Nassau County, New York, United States, within the Massapequa 11758 Zip code. Its name is a portmanteau for the Town of Oyster Bay, which owns and manages the beach. Residents of the town are allowed entry, with limited access for non-residents.

== History ==
Tobay Beach was opened to the public sometime between 1926 and 1949, and has been owned and operated by the Town of Oyster Bay since its opening date. The beach became the backdrop of one of Marilyn Monroe's famous photoshoots in June 1949, taken by Andre de Dienes. At this time, the beach was mainly used for its marina. The beach became more "visitor-friendly" in the 1960s as the population of the town grew; the parking lot expanded from less than one-fourth of today's lot's size to three-fourths, a main building with restrooms was constructed on the north side, and the shoreline was enlarged on both the north and south sides.

The entrance to the beach from Ocean Parkway was redesigned in the 1970s; it was originally an oval-shaped traffic circle, but traffic was restricted to and from the parking lot to the westbound lanes. Vehicles on the eastbound lanes have to use a turnaround 2,000 feet away from the main entrance.

In the 1980s, a second round of improvements came. A helipad was made, a large welcome sign was constructed, and the parking lot was extended to its current length. In 1989, the town began to stabilize the dunes against erosion.

The Town has improved upon the beach a lot in recent history. In 2008, the marina reached its current size, and 2009 the spray park opened to the public. In 2010, new dining was provided, and a miniature golf course was opened to the public a year after. After Joseph Saladino became Town Supervisor in 2017, he switched the food vendors at the two (previously three) dining locations, and replaced the miniature golf course with more public dining space. The spray park was completely redesigned in 2019, along with a new fitness area and playground.

During the COVID-19 pandemic, the beach remained opened, however with 50% capacity, and with face coverings and social distancing required as per New York State regulations. The hours of operation of the beach diminished between March and July, and in late May, a live-camera of the beach was posted on the beach website to inform beachgoers how crowded the beach is.

== Description ==
Access to the beach is via Ocean Parkway. Tobay Beach is far east of Jones Beach State Park and just west of West Gilgo Beach across the Nassau–Suffolk County line.

It contains four pavilions, five food stands, surfing and soft boarding area, and a picnic area. There is also a 150-slip marina along South Oyster Bay. Near the parking lot, there is general playground and fitness area. The spray park has a food stand, a water playground, and other water-related toys.
