= Gilgo State Park =

State park in Suffolk County, New York

- Location within New York
- Type: State park (undeveloped)
- Location: Jones Beach Island, New York
- Nearest city: Babylon, New York
- Coordinates: 40.637°N 73.318°W
- Area: 1,223 acres (4.95 km^{2})
- Operator: New York State Office of Parks, Recreation and Historic Preservation
- Open: All year
- Website: Gilgo State Park

Gilgo State Park is a 1,223-acre (4.95 km^{2}) undeveloped state park in Gilgo, Suffolk County, New York. The park is located on Jones Beach Island, a barrier island off the southern shore of Long Island.

== History ==
Previous use of the land was for a United States Life-Saving Service called "Station Gilgo" and referred to as USLSS Station #27. At the western edge of the park are the remains of this station and is known locally as the Old Coast Guard Station. No markings on the site identify its history of life saving. It is thought the first building was erected in 1853, serving as a base for volunteer life savers who would walk/patrol the beach and observe ships in distress. It was to aid in recovery of life and property aboard the ships which ran aground. The service was merged into the US Coast Guard in 1925 and later developments in technology made this service inefficient, which caused it to be abandoned.

For some years later, it stood unused until Robert Moses negotiated with the federal government to include it in his Long Island Parks Region. Land around the former Coast Guard Station was acquired in phases from the Town of Babylon from 1928 through 1930.

The terms of this transfer are still being explored, though it appears, the parties agreed that this land would be forever wild and available to all residents for their wholesome recreation. No one user group would have exclusive privilege to its use and it would not be closed for whatever reason, with the exception of occasional closing for general safety.

== Park description ==
Gilgo State Park is an undeveloped park, featuring waterfront access to the Atlantic Ocean to the south, and Great South Bay to the north. For many years, locals from the mainland have crossed the Great South Bay, anchored and walked south to the ocean beach. Here they could picnic, swim and surf the famous "Hemlocks Beach".

Due to its undeveloped nature, visitors are required to haul out what they bring in with them, and there is no bathroom or garbage cans. Other access is by NYS four-wheel drive vehicle surfing permit issued by a joint program with NYS parks and the Town of Babylon, although Ocean Parkway passes the park. The park features tranquility, shore scenery, and surfing.

The park also serves as a wildlife reserve, aiming to preserve habitat for the piping plover and the sea beach amaranth. No pets are permitted within the park.

== See also ==
- List of New York state parks
