= Ocean Parkway (Long Island) =

Highway on Long Island, New York

Ocean Parkway
- Ocean Parkway highlighted in red

Route information
- Maintained by NYSDOT and NYS OPRHP
- Length: 15.59 mi (25.09 km)

Major junctions
- West end: Meadowbrook State Parkway / Bay Parkway at Jones Beach
- Wantagh State Parkway at Jones Beach; Robert Moses Causeway at Captree State Park
- East end: Captree Boat Basin at Captree State Park

Location
- Country: United States
- State: New York
- Counties: Nassau, Suffolk

Highway system
- New York Highways; Interstate; US; State; Reference; Parkways
- Ocean Parkway
- U.S. National Register of Historic Places
- U.S. Historic district – Contributing property
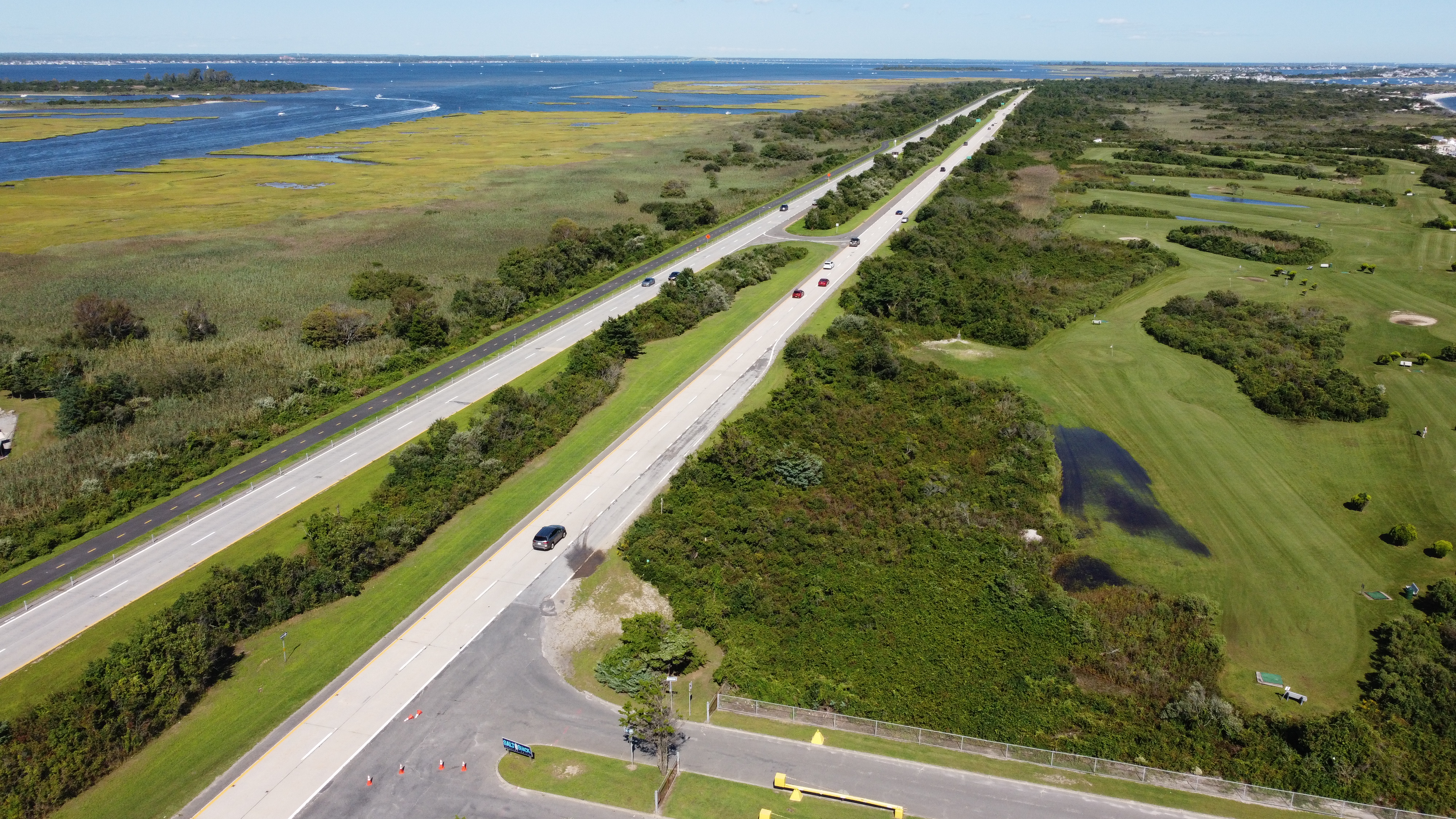
- An aerial view of Ocean Parkway taken by a drone
- Location: Jones Beach Island
- Part of: Jones Beach State Park, Causeway and Parkway System
- NRHP reference No.: 05000358
- Added to NRHP: April 28, 2005

The Ocean Parkway (abbreviated as OP) is a 15.59-mile (25.09 km) limited-access parkway that traverses Jones Beach Island between Jones Beach State Park and Captree State Park on Long Island, New York, United States. It begins at the southern terminus of the Meadowbrook State Parkway and heads east across Jones Beach Island, intersecting the south end of the Wantagh State Parkway before ending just past the Robert Moses Causeway.

The highway is designated New York State Route 909D (NY 909D), an unsigned reference route – and it is listed on the National Register of Historic Places as a contributing asset to the Jones Beach State Park, Causeway and Parkway System historic district.

== Route description ==
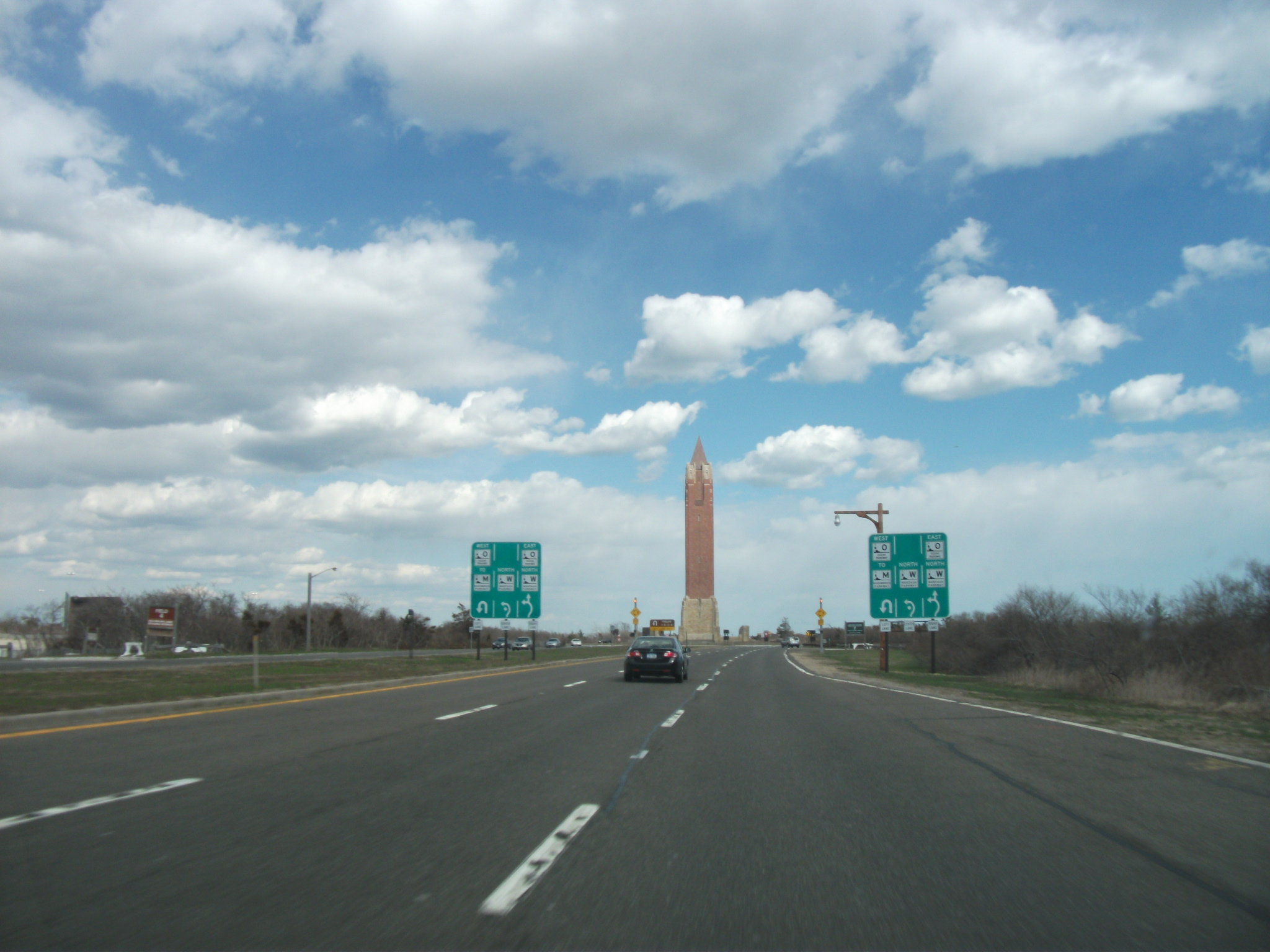
The Ocean Parkway eastbound approaching the Wantagh State Parkway in Jones Beach

The Ocean Parkway begins at a cloverleaf interchange with the southern terminus of the Meadowbrook State Parkway and the Bay Parkway in Jones Beach State Park. Proceeding eastward, the Ocean Parkway parallels the Bay Parkway through Jones Beach State Park, running along the beachfront and past multiple recreational facilities. Just after a connection to the Bay Parkway, the four-lane parkway passes a parking lot for Jones Beach, along with a turnoff into a secondary lot for the bathhouse and the Jones Beach Theatre. In front of that turnoff, the westbound lanes pass two ramps that lead to a large parking lot that spans the gap between the Ocean and Bay parkways. After the parking lot, the Ocean Parkway enters a roundabout around the Jones Beach Water Tower (locally known as "The Pencil"), marking the southern terminus of the Wantagh State Parkway.

After the Wantagh, the Ocean Parkway continues east along the beachfront, passing another large parking lot on the westbound lanes and additional access to facilities at Jones Beach on the eastbound lanes. The four-lane parkway then begins to run between the beachfront and the shore for Zachs Bay, a section of South Oyster Bay. Passing multiple u-turn ramps between directions, the parkway soon leaves Jones Beach State Park and enters a piece of the town of Oyster Bay. Passing south of Guggenheim Pond, the Ocean Parkway continues east as the four-lane arterial it was in the park, soon entering Tobay Beach Park, where the median expands for a short distance. In the center of the park, the parkway reaches the parking lots on the westbound lanes and the Tobay Beach bathhouse on the eastbound lanes. A cross under is provided under the lanes of the Ocean for people to safely cross the parkway.

A short distance from the bathhouse, the Ocean Parkway leaves Tobay Beach Park and enters Suffolk County and the Town of Babylon. Entering the hamlet of West Gilgo Beach, the parkway runs alongside many beachfront residences, with an intersection from the westbound lanes to the community. Soon entering Gilgo Beach, the Ocean passes several more bayside residences along the Great South Bay. The parkway expands to six lanes as it passes the access to Gilgo Beach and crosses over the pedestrian tunnel connecting the parking lot and the beach. Near the pedestrian tunnel, the parking lot is accessed via a tolled entrance from the westbound lanes. As the Ocean Parkway leaves Gilgo Beach, the six-lane parkway crosses into Gilgo State Park. Through Gilgo State Park, the Ocean Parkway develops a wide, grassy median between the six lanes. Passing another section of the Great South Bay, the parkway soon leaves the park, where the median returns, thins out and access is provided to another beach and recreational facilities, as the road passes the Cedar Beach Golf Course. Entering another section of Gilgo State Park, the Ocean Parkway evens out eastward before leaving the park for the hamlet of Oak Beach. Crossing north of several oceanside residences, the parkway soon crosses between the Atlantic Ocean and Oak Island as it reaches the center of the hamlet. Before paralleling Captree Island, the parkway expands with a wider median once again, entering Captree State Park. A short distance into the park, the Ocean Parkway enters a cloverleaf interchange with the Robert Moses Causeway.

After the causeway, the Ocean Parkway reduces to four lanes as it crosses into the town of Islip, reaching the tollbooths that mark the eastern terminus of the Ocean. On the other side of the tollbooths, the right-of-way enters another roundabout and connects to another beach and the local marina in Captree State Park.

== History ==
Originally, there had been plans to extend the parkway to nearby Fire Island, and two attempts were made to authorize construction. However, residents resisted the plan: the first time for economic reasons, the second for environmental reasons. Although the Robert Moses Causeway was extended from its original terminus on Captree Island to Fire Island in 1964, leading to the potential extension of Ocean Parkway, park legislation in the 1960s blocked further plans to extend the parkway.

During the 2000s and early 2010s, several discarded bodies were discovered along the Ocean Parkway. The discoveries received widespread media coverage and prompted a major police investigation into the crimes. In July 2023, Rex Heuermann was arrested in three of the murders and charged as a prime suspect in a fourth. Heurmann pleaded guilty to all charges in 2026.

In 2005, the Ocean Parkway – along with several other Long Island parkways – was listed on the National Register of Historic Places, as part of a historic district, known as the Jones Beach State Park, Causeway and Parkway System.

The eastbound direction of the parkway was significantly damaged by Hurricane Sandy in October 2012. The westbound side of the road was reconfigured into a two-lane, two-way highway while the eastbound lanes were repaired.

== Exit list ==
All exits are unnumbered.

County	Location	mi	km	Destinations	Notes
Nassau	Jones Beach State Park	0.00	0.00	Meadowbrook State Parkway north	Continuation north
Nassau	Jones Beach State Park	0.00	0.00	Bay Parkway – Theater, West End Beaches	
Nassau	Jones Beach State Park	2.00	3.22	Wantagh State Parkway north	Roundabout; southern terminus of Wantagh State Parkway
Suffolk	West Gilgo Beach	7.00	11.27	West Gilgo Beach	Eastbound access is via center median u-turn ramp
Suffolk	Captree State Park	15.27	24.57	Robert Moses Causeway – Robert Moses State Park	
Suffolk	Captree State Park	15.59	25.09	Fee booths (eastbound)	
Suffolk	Captree State Park	15.70	25.27	Captree Boat Basin	Roundabout; eastern terminus
1.000 mi = 1.609 km; 1.000 km = 0.621 mi: Tolled

== Ocean Parkway Coastal Greenway ==
In March 2021, the Ocean Parkway Shared Use Path was completed, making it possible to bike or walk from Jones Beach's West End beaches to the Jones Beach Theater, and further east to Captree State Park in Suffolk County. The Greenway connects into mainland Long Island via the Ellen Farrant Shared-Use Path alongside the Wantagh State Parkway terminating in Seaford's Cedar Creek Park.
