= Jones Beach State Park, Causeway and Parkway System =

- U.S. National Register of Historic Places
- U.S. Historic district
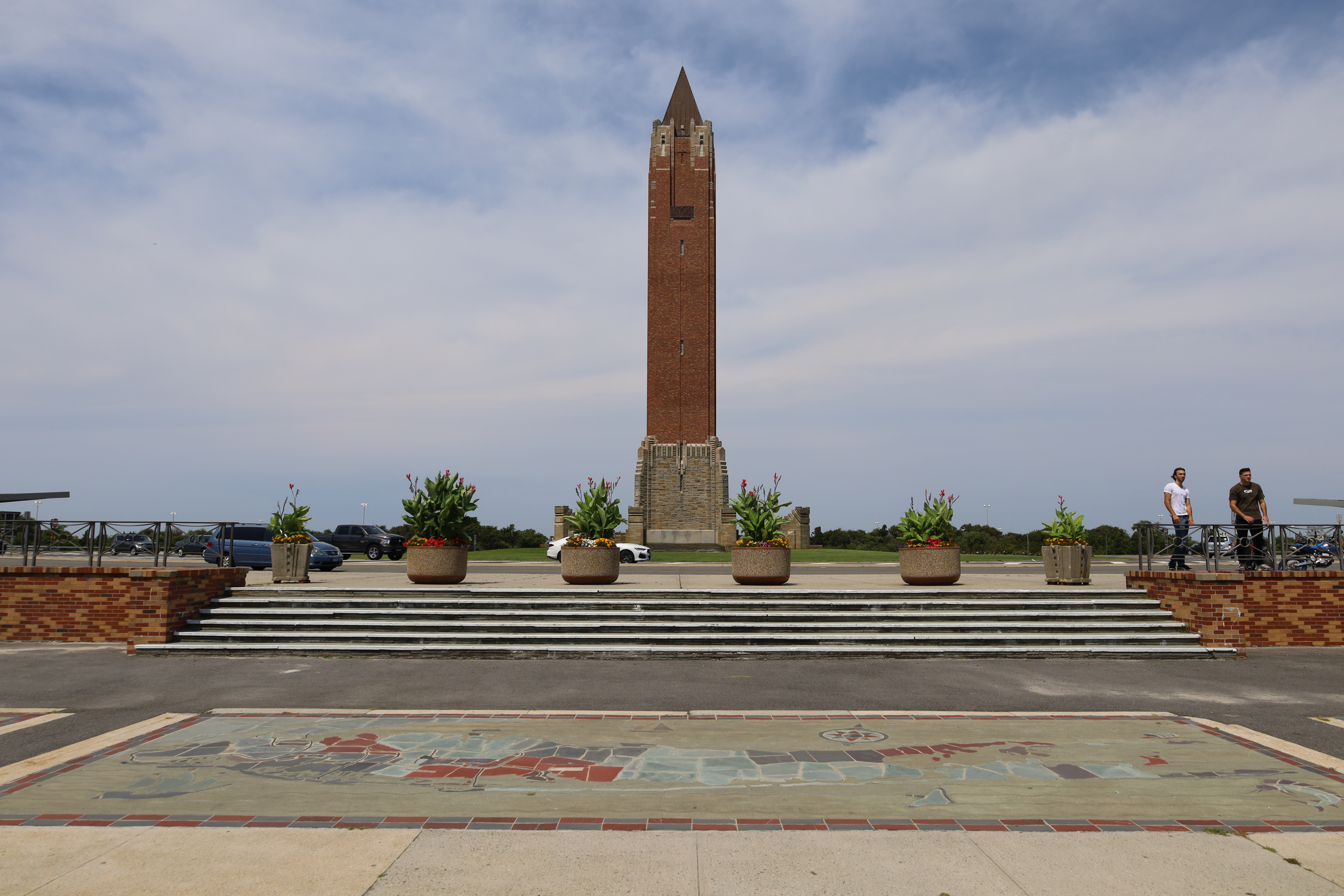
- The Jones Beach Water Tower in 2021 – one of the most prominent structures within the historic district.
- Location: Ocean, Wantagh, Meadowbrook and Loop State Parkways, Wantagh, New York
- Coordinates: 40°36′51″N 73°32′10″W
- Area: 10,034 acres (4,061 ha)
- Built: 1920s–1930s
- Planned by: Robert Moses
- NRHP reference No.: 05000358
- Added to NRHP: April 28, 2005

The Jones Beach State Park, Causeway and Parkway System is a national historic district located in Nassau County, New York, United States.

== Description ==
The historic district encompasses Jones Beach State Park and many of the related causeways and parkways built by Robert Moses to connect to it. Furthermore, the district consists of a total of 22 buildings and 33 structures.

The causeways and parkways landmarked as part of the district are the portions of the Meadowbrook & Wantagh State Parkways south of the Southern State Parkway – in addition to the Ocean Parkway and the Loop Parkway.

The district was listed on the National Register of Historic Places on April 28, 2005.

== See also ==
- Miami Beach Architectural District – another federally-designated historic district in the United States along a major Atlantic Coast beach, in Miami Beach, Florida.
- Jones Beach Theater – a performing arts venue at Jones Beach.
