= Gilgo, New York =

- Hamlet and census-designated place
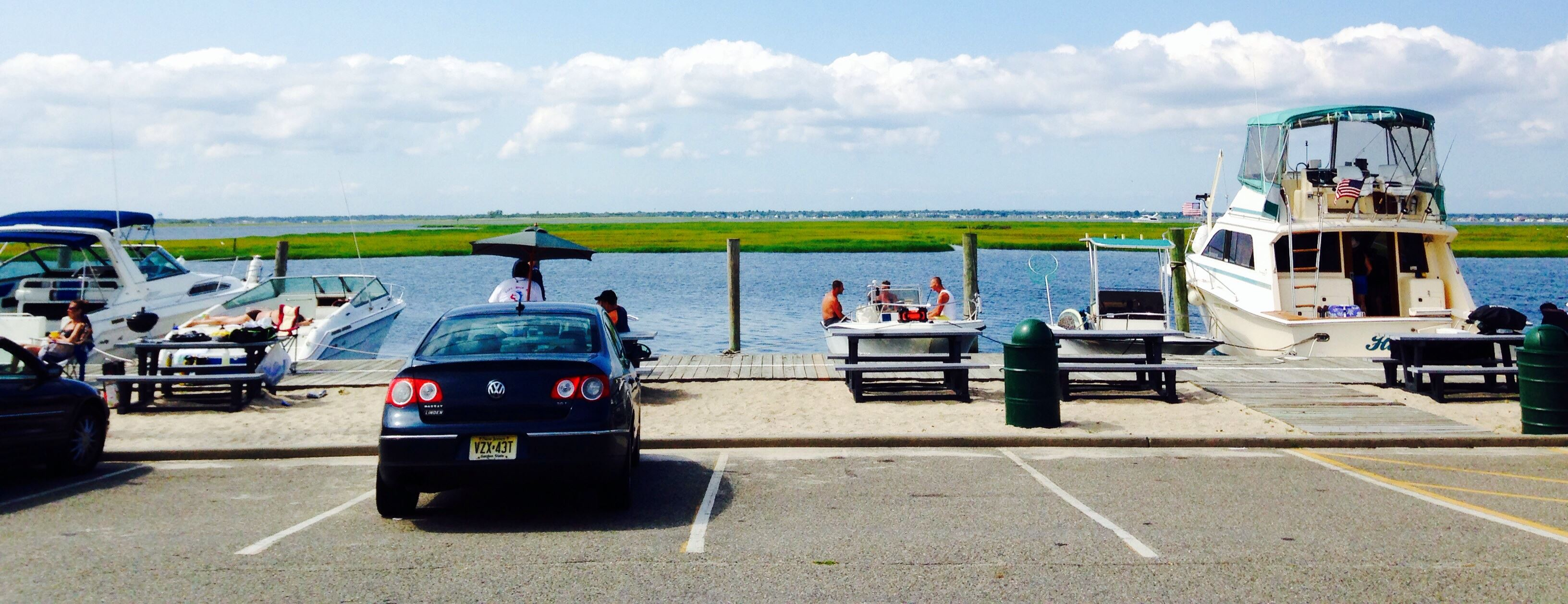
- The Great South Bay looking toward Long Island from Gilgo Beach

- Location within the state of New York Gilgo (Long Island)
- Coordinates: 40°37′04″N 73°23′48″W
- Country: United States
- State: New York
- County: Suffolk
- Town: Babylon

Area
  - Total: 15.38 sq mi (39.84 km^{2})
  - Land: 5.02 sq mi (13.00 km^{2})
  - Water: 10.36 sq mi (26.84 km^{2})
- Elevation: 10 ft (3.0 m)

Population (2020)
  - Total: 185
  - Density: 36.9/sq mi (14.23/km^{2})
- Time zone: UTC-5 (Eastern (EST))
  - Summer (DST): UTC-4 (EDT)
- Area codes: 631, 934
- FIPS code: 36-28990

Gilgo is a hamlet and census-designated place (CDP) in the Town of Babylon in Suffolk County, New York, United States. The population was 185 at the time of the 2020 census.

Prior to the 2010 census, the area was part of a larger CDP called Gilgo-Oak Beach-Captree. The Gilgo CDP contains several small beach communities on Jones Beach Island, a barrier island along the southern edge of Long Island. In order from west to east, these include West Gilgo (on the Nassau/Suffolk county border), Gilgo Beach, and Cedar Beach (no residences). To the east along the beach is the CDP of Oak Beach.

== Geography ==
According to the United States Census Bureau, the CDP has a total area of 11.7 square miles (30.3 km^{2}), of which 5.0 square miles (12.9 km^{2}) is land and 6.7 square miles (17.4 km^{2}) – or 57.31% – is water.

== Demographics ==
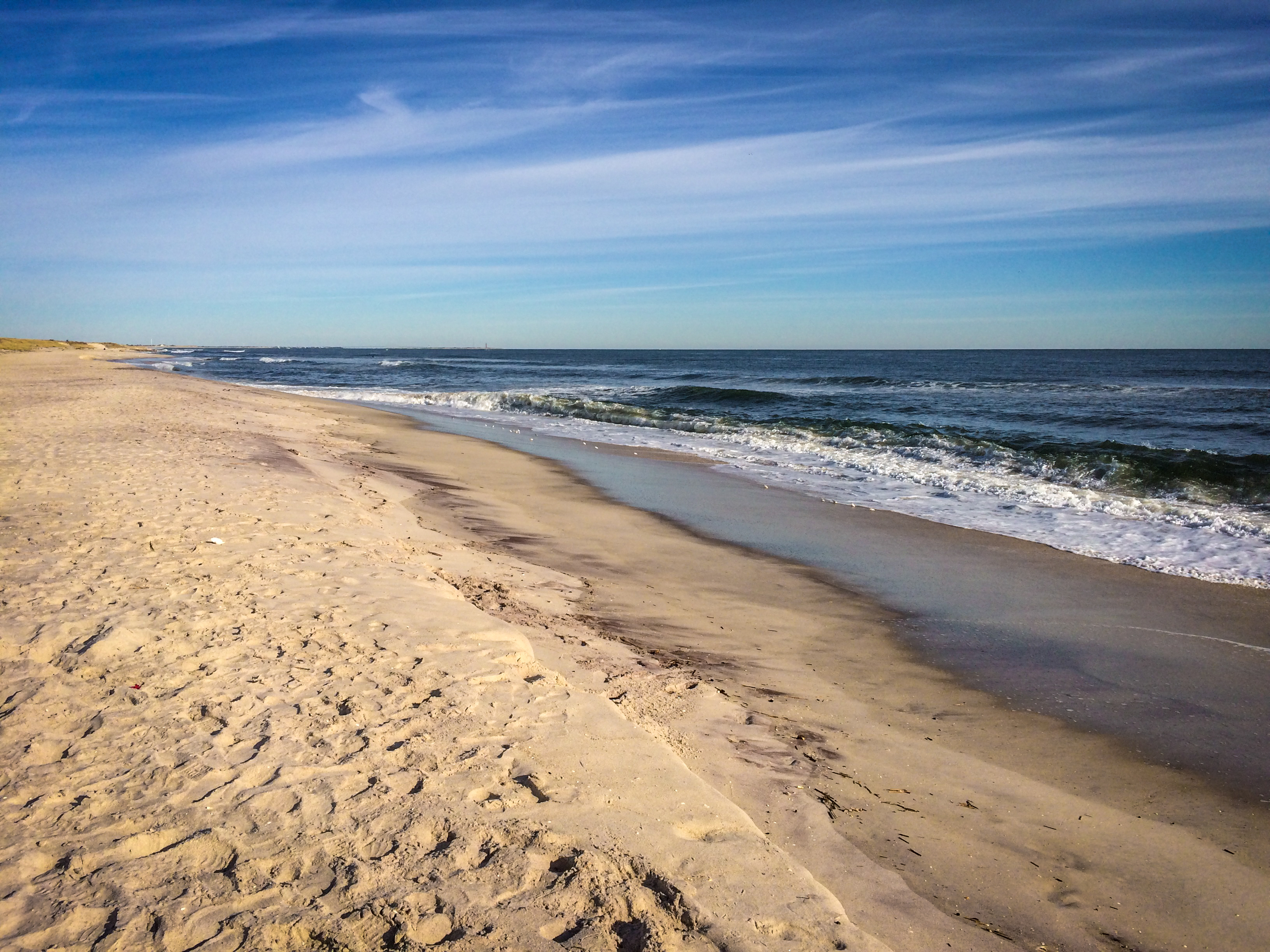
Gilgo Beach in March 2016

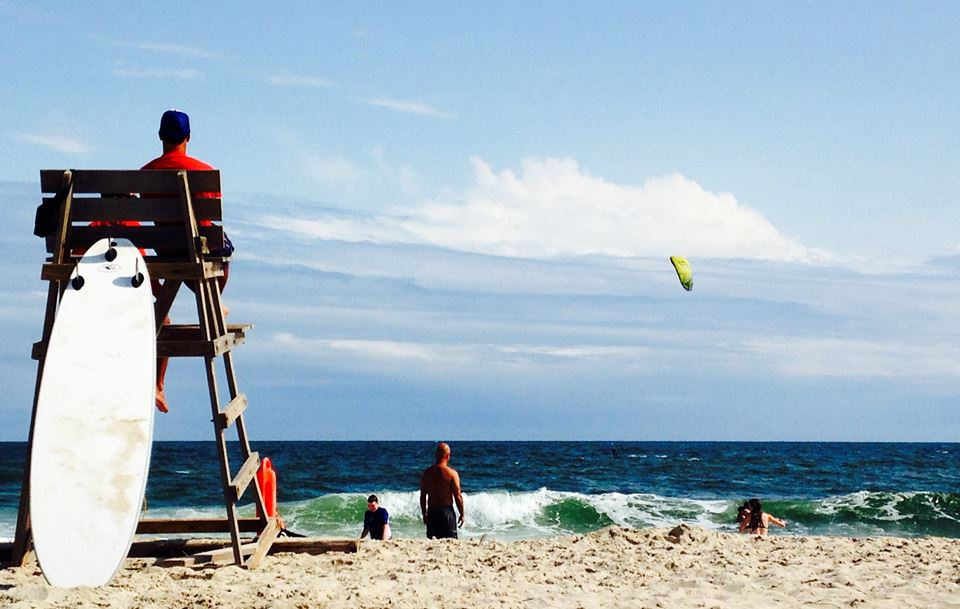
The Atlantic Ocean as seen from the opposite side of Ocean Parkway on the Beach

Historical population
| Census | Pop. | Note | %± |
|---|---|---|---|
| 2020 | 185 | | — |
U.S. Decennial Census

The census numbers are presumably for full-time inhabitants; many of these houses are second homes and not primary residences, although the proportion of seasonal residents is decreasing.

The land for these communities is not privately owned, but leased from the state of New York through the year 2050. However, the residences on the property are owned. If the leases are not renewed at some point in the future, the owners will have to move the houses elsewhere, similar to what happened at High Hill Beach when Jones Beach State Park was created.

As of the census of 2010, the racial makeup of the CDP was 100.0% White. 2.3% of the population reported Hispanic or Latino ancestry.

The population was spread out, with 19.8% under age 18, 4.6% from 18 to 24, 16.0% from 25 to 44, 39.7% from 45 to 64, and 19.8% over 64.

The median income for a household in the CDP was $154,934, and the median income for a family was $154,276. The per capita income for the CDP was $67,428. None of the families or the population were below the poverty line.

== Education ==
Gilgo is served by the Babylon Union Free School District.

== See also ==
- Jones Beach Island
- Ocean Parkway
