= West Gilgo Beach, New York =

Gated community in Babylon, New York, United States

Coordinates: 40°36′44″N 73°25′07″W

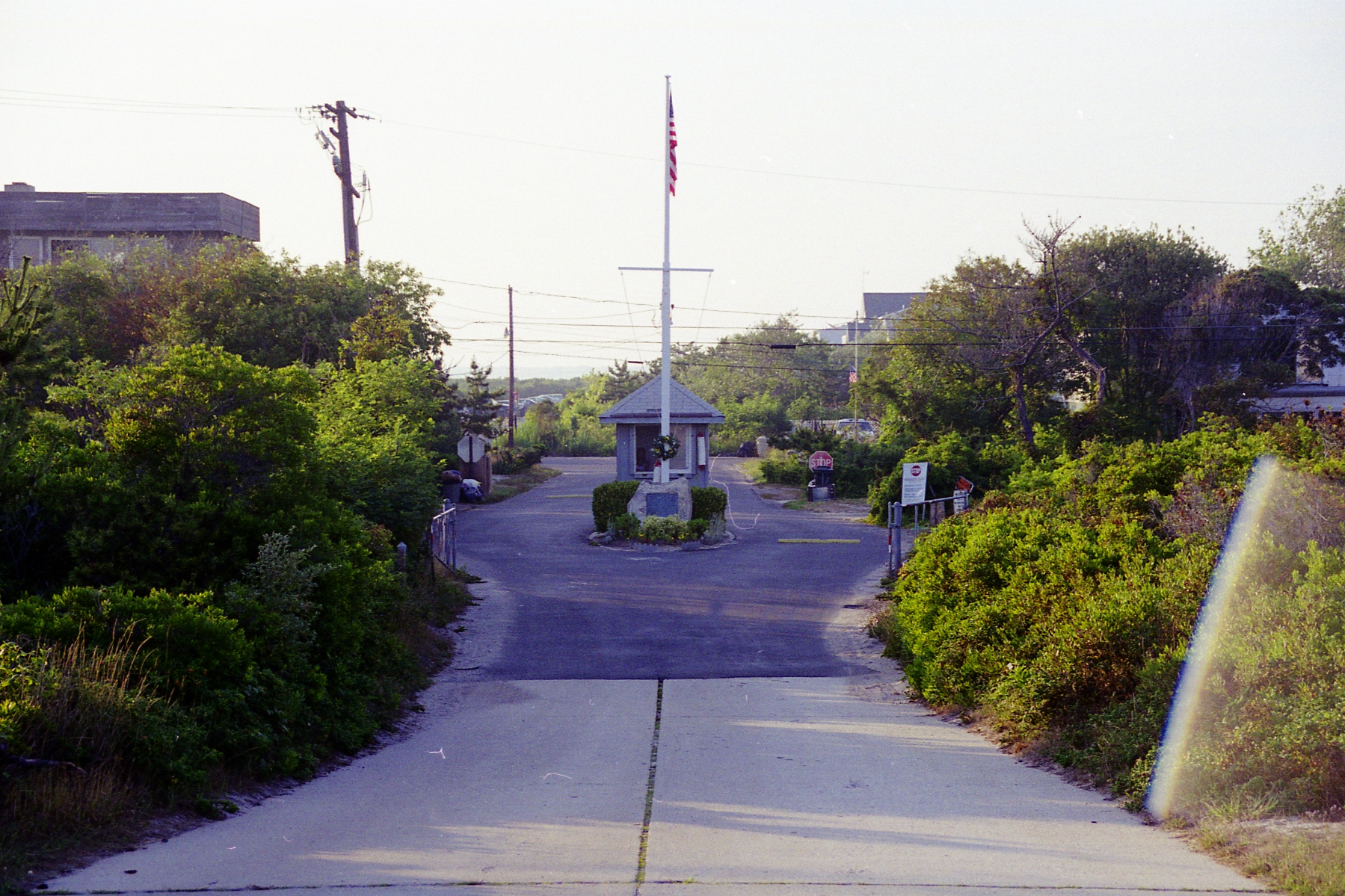
West Gilgo Beach main gate (July 1999)

West Gilgo Beach is a small private gated community located in the town of Babylon, in Suffolk County, New York, United States. It is part of the Gilgo census-designated place.

== History ==
West Gilgo Beach was founded on September 18, 1939, by residents of High Hill Beach, who were displaced by the creation of Jones Beach State Park. About 60 of the original houses were moved by barge or the newly constructed road, from the Zachs Bay section of Jones Beach to the new community. Since then, the West Gilgo Beach Association has grown to approximately 80 houses.

== Description ==
Originally almost entirely a summer community, over half of the houses are now winterized, and there is a mix of full-time and second home residents. The community hosts a small non-denominational church, a self-service library, an unmanned post office, and small firehouses that have hoses on carts. Residents depend on central well water and individual septic tanks.

It also provides the only land access to the Unqua Corinthian Yacht Club.

The land is not owned by the residents, but is on long-term lease from the town of Babylon. In the early 1990s, there was litigation by New York State not to extend the lease. After much negotiation, the lease was renewed, with a ramp-up in costs.

== Noteworthy projects ==
In July 2011, West Gilgo Beach residents united to beautify the community via a large-scale mural painting in the beach-access tunnel.

== Geography ==
West Gilgo Beach is located on Jones Beach Island, a barrier island between the Atlantic Ocean and the Great South Bay of Long Island. West Gilgo Beach is an L-shaped community with two roads: Ocean Walk, which begins at the border of Nassau County and Suffolk County and extends east along Ocean Parkway, and Bay Walk, which begins at the gate and heads north towards the South Oyster Bay. West Gilgo Beach is a right-in/right-out exit from Ocean Parkway, between Tobay Beach and Gilgo Beach.
