= Jones Beach State Park =

State park in New York, United States

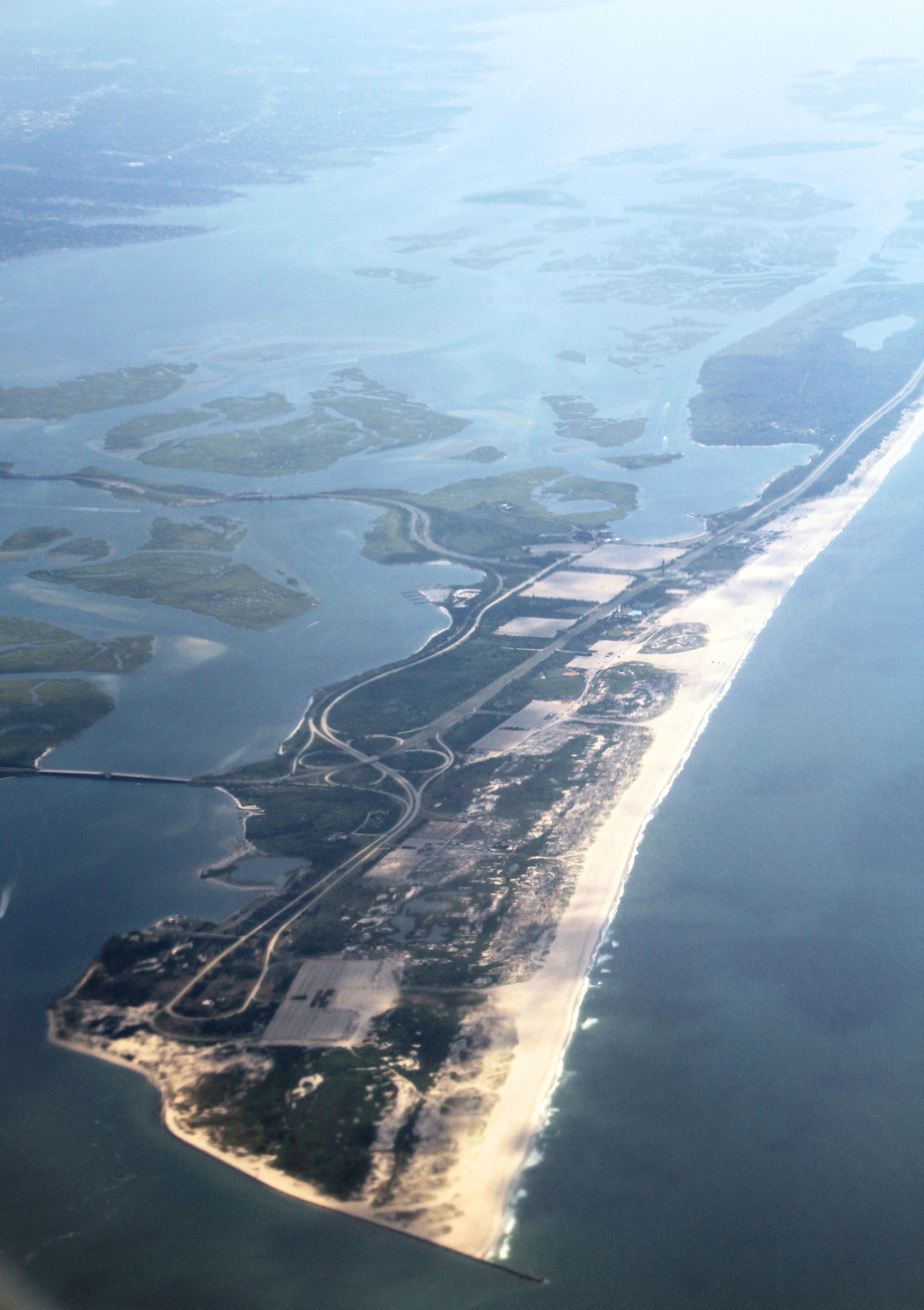
- Aerial view of Jones Beach Island and Jones Beach State Park in July 2012
- Interactive map of Jones Beach State Park
- Type: State park
- Location: 1 Ocean Parkway; Wantagh, New York, U.S.
- Coordinates: 40°35′45″N 73°30′55″W
- Area: 2,413 acres (9.77 km^{2})
- Created: August 4, 1929
- Operator: New York State Office of Parks, Recreation and Historic Preservation
- Visitors: 9,534,728 (in 2024)
- Open: All year
- Public transit: Nassau Inter-County Express: n88X (seasonal)
- Website: Jones Beach State Park
- Jones Beach State Park, Causeway and Parkway System
- U.S. National Register of Historic Places
- U.S. Historic district
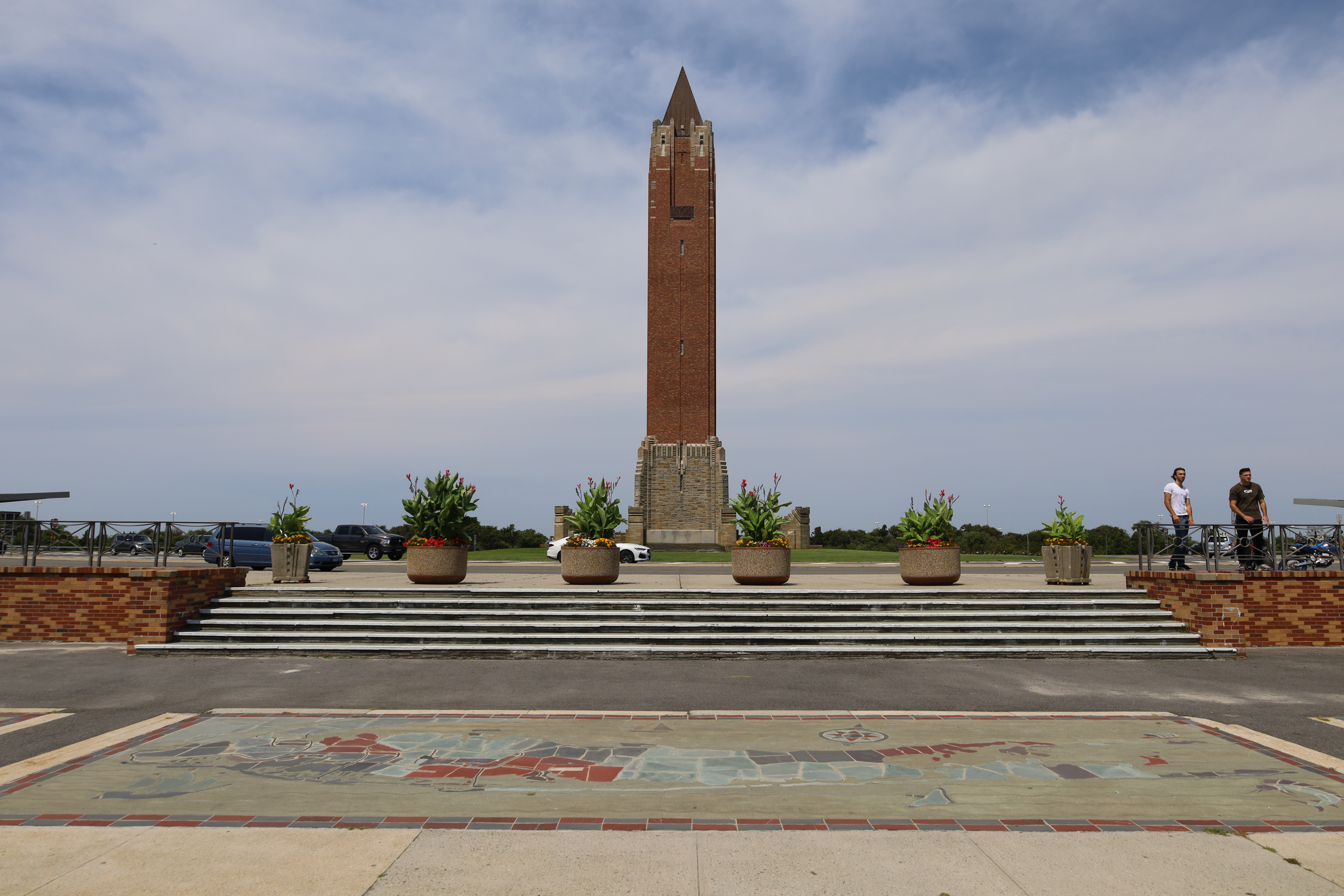
- Jones Beach Water Tower in 2021
- Location: Ocean, Wantagh, Meadowbrook and Loop state parkways, Wantagh, New York
- Coordinates: 40°36′51″N 73°32′10″W
- Area: 10,034 acres (4,061 ha)
- NRHP reference No.: 05000358
- Added to NRHP: April 28, 2005

Jones Beach State Park (colloquially "Jones Beach") is a state park in the U.S. state of New York. It is located in southern Nassau County on Jones Beach Island, a barrier island linked to Long Island by the Meadowbrook State Parkway, Wantagh State Parkway, and Ocean Parkway. The park was created during Robert Moses' administration as President of the Long Island State Park Commission as part of the development of parkways on Long Island.

The park, 6.5 miles (10.5 km) in length, is renowned for its beaches (which, excepting the beach on Zachs Bay, face the open Atlantic Ocean) and furnishes one of the most popular summer recreational locations for the New York metropolitan area. It is the most popular and heavily visited beach on the East Coast, with an estimated six million visitors per year.

Northwell Health at Jones Beach Theater, an outdoor arena in the park, is a popular musical and concert venue. The park also includes a two-mile (3.2 km) boardwalk. It once featured dining and catering facilities that were popular sites for private parties and weddings, though these have been shut down.

Jones Beach is named after Major Thomas Jones, a major in the Queens County militia in the 17th century, who established a whaling operation on the outer beach near the site of the present park.

== History ==
Jones Beach was Moses' first major public project, free from housing developments and private clubs, and is open for the general public.

When Moses' group first surveyed Jones Island in the 1920s, it was swampy and only two feet (0.61 m) above sea level; the island was frequently submerged during storms. To create the park, huge dredgers brought sand from the bay bottom, eventually raising the island to 12 feet (3.7 m) above sea level. Another problem was the wind: the fine silver beach sand would blow, making the workers miserable and making the use of the beach as a recreational facility unlikely. Moses sent landscape architects to other stable Long Island beaches, who reported that a beach grass (Ammophila breviligulata), whose roots grew sideways in search of water, held dunes in place, forming a barrier to the wind. In the summer of 1928, thousands of men worked on the beach planting the grass by hand. Several houses on High Hill Beach were moved by barge eastward to West Gilgo Beach to make room for the park.

Many of its buildings and facilities feature Art Deco architecture. In the center of a traffic circle that he planned as a terminus for the Wantagh State Parkway, Moses ordered the construction of an Italianate-style water tower to serve as a central feature of the park. Two large bathhouses are also prominent. After rejecting a number of submissions by architects for the bathhouses, Moses selected the designs of the young and relatively inexperienced Herbert Magoon. Moses also specified that they be built of Ohio Sandstone and Barbizon brick, two of the most expensive materials available.

The park opened to the public on August 4, 1929, along with the causeway that provided automobile access from the mainland of Long Island. The causeway was the first section in what was to become the Wantagh State Parkway. Unusually for the time, no carnival-style amusements were allowed in the park area.

Moses used low clearances for the bridges over the Southern State Parkway, a major east–west route to Jones Beach. Robert Caro, author of the Moses biography The Power Broker, alleged that this was done intentionally to prevent poor and minority people from accessing the beach by public bus. Even for earlier-built parkways in Westchester County that Moses used as inspiration, bridge clearances are on average higher than on the Southern State.

Since 2004, Jones Beach has hosted the Bethpage Air Show during the last weekend of May (Memorial Day weekend). The air show is one of the largest in the United States, and was attended by 231,000 people in 2015.

On April 28, 2005, the park and many of its related causeways & parkways were listed on the National Register of Historic Places, in a historic district known as the Jones Beach State Park, Causeway and Parkway System.

== Park features and facilities ==
=== Ocean and bay beachfronts ===
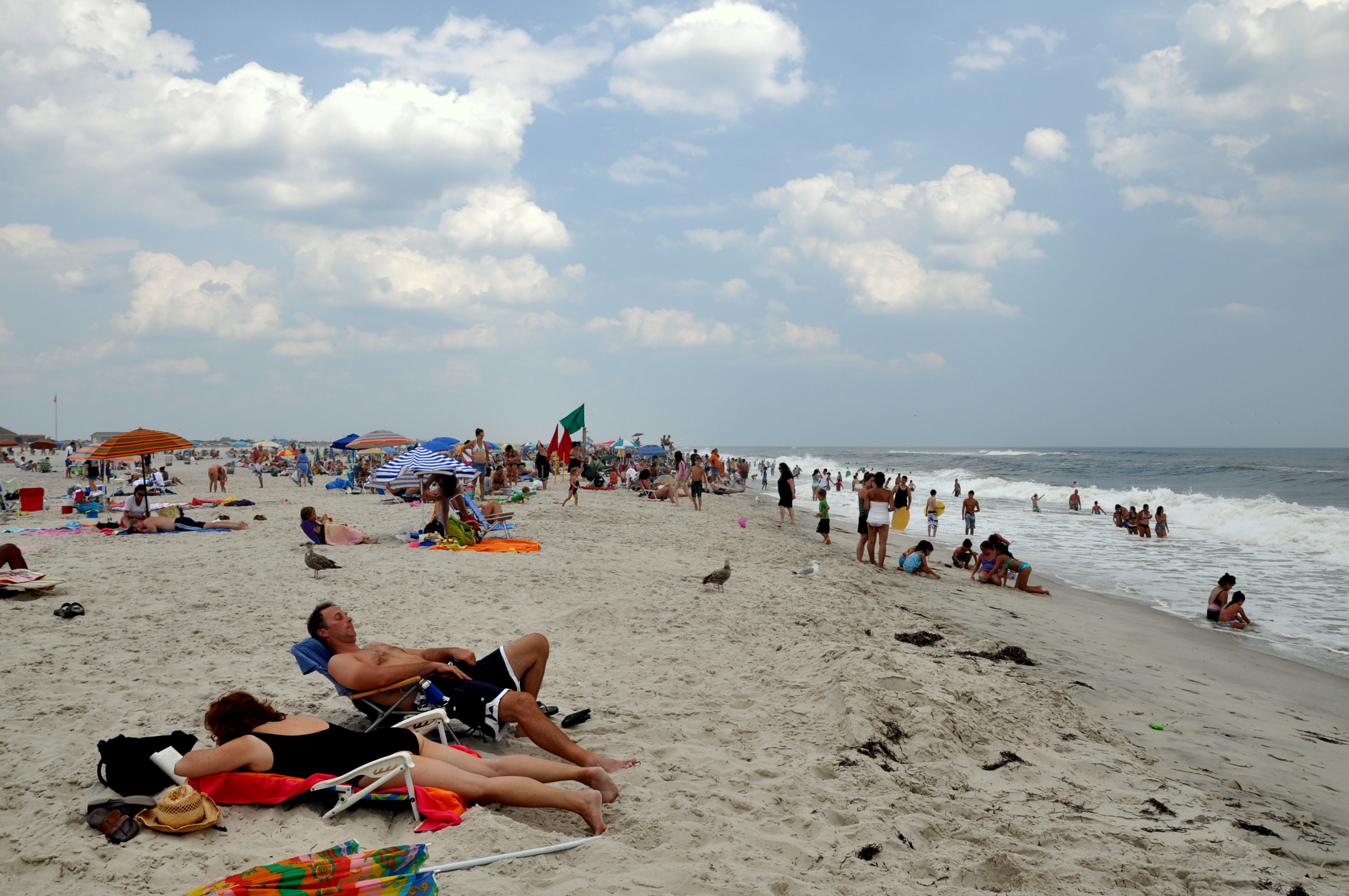
Sunbathers in 2010

The beach consists of 6.5 miles (10.5 km) of ocean beach frontage and one-half mile (0.80 km) of bay frontage.

=== Buildings and entertainment facilities ===
The primary buildings on the Jones Beach site are the two bathhouses (west and east) and the park's large water tower, all built to Moses' specifications. The 188-foot (57 m) water tower, built in 1930 to resemble the bell tower of St Mark's Basilica in Venice, underwent a $6.1 million restoration in 2010. Robert Moses' plan originally included two swimming pools available for public use at Jones Beach: The West Bath House pool and the East Bath House pool. While the West Bath House pool has remained open, budget constraints forced the closure of the East Bath House pool in 2009. As part of a $65 million refurbishment of the park announced in 2014, the West Bath House will receive $7 million in improvements; state officials have announced their desire to eventually rehabilitate the East Bath House as well.

Large mosaics on the Central Mall Walkway near the water tower were restored in 2015; the $177,000 mosaic restoration was part of a larger $65 million refurbishment of the park announced in 2014.

The park also includes the Jones Beach Boardwalk Bandshell, located near Parking Field 4, which offers live performances and free music.

There is a 0.5-mile-long (0.80 km) beach along Zachs Bay. One-half mile (0.80 km) north of the beach, overlooking Zachs Bay, is the 15,200-seat Northwell Health at Jones Beach Theater, formerly known as the Jones Beach Marine Theater. This outdoor amphitheatre opened in June 1952.

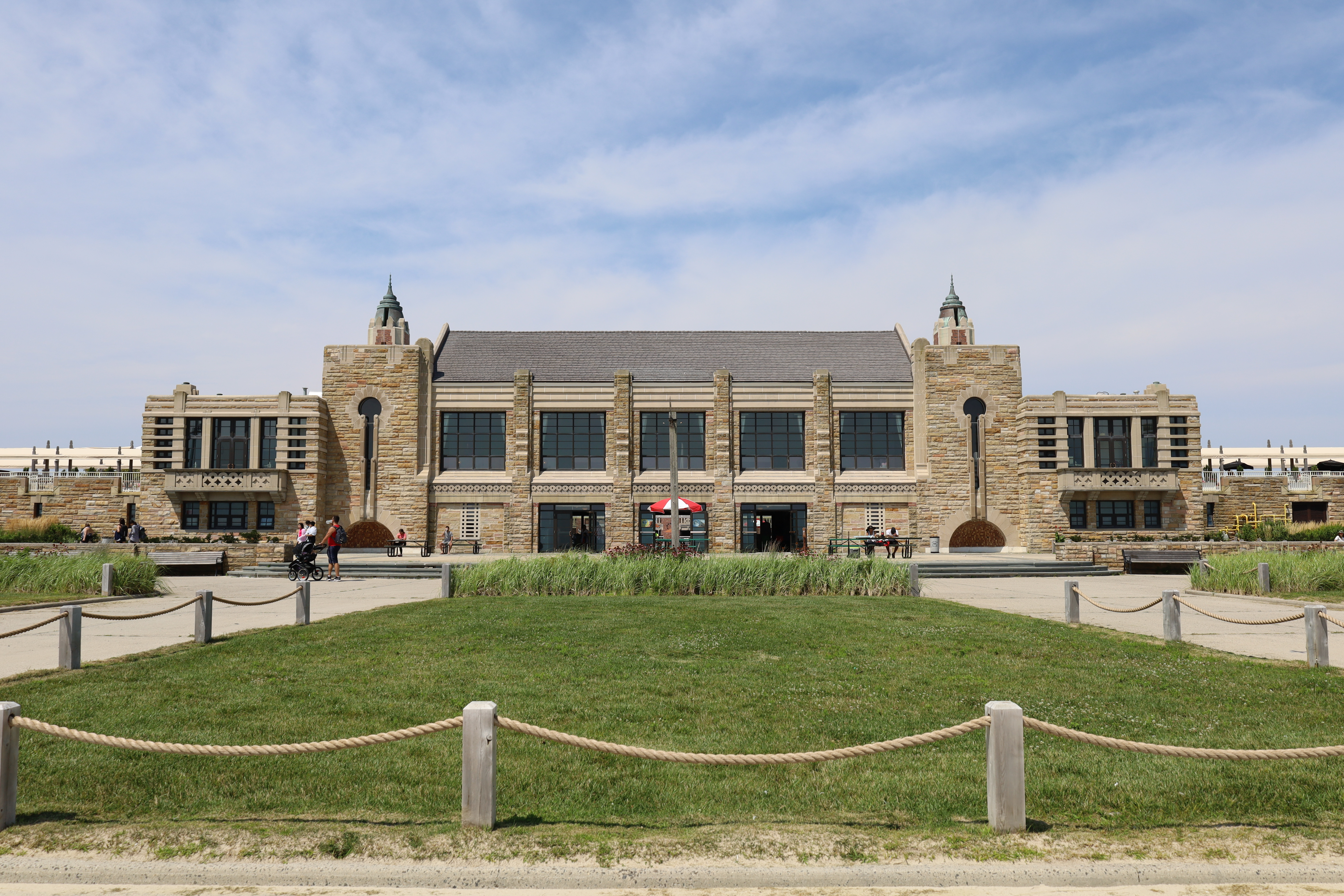
West Bathhouse

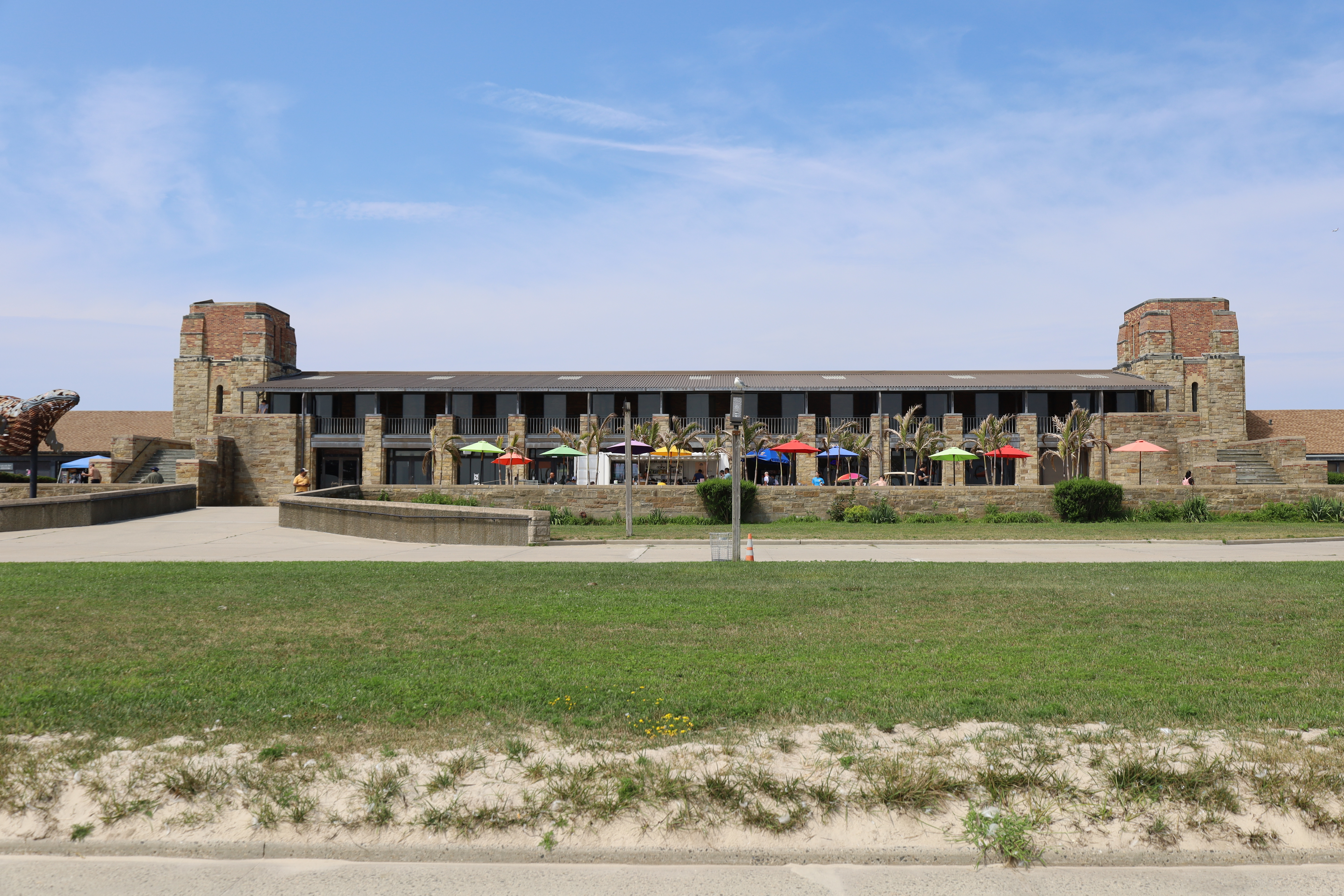
East Bathhouse

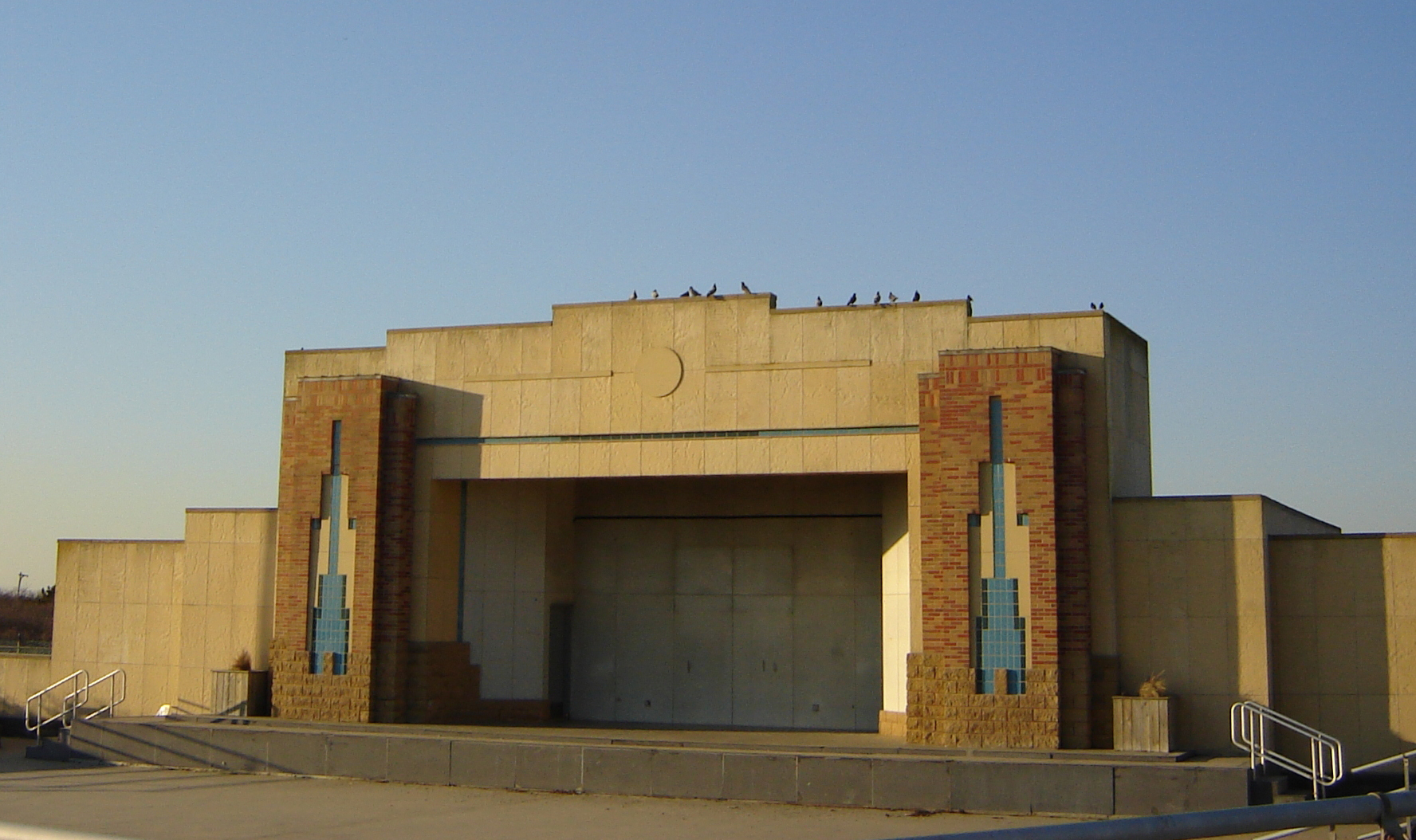
The Jones Beach Boardwalk Bandshell

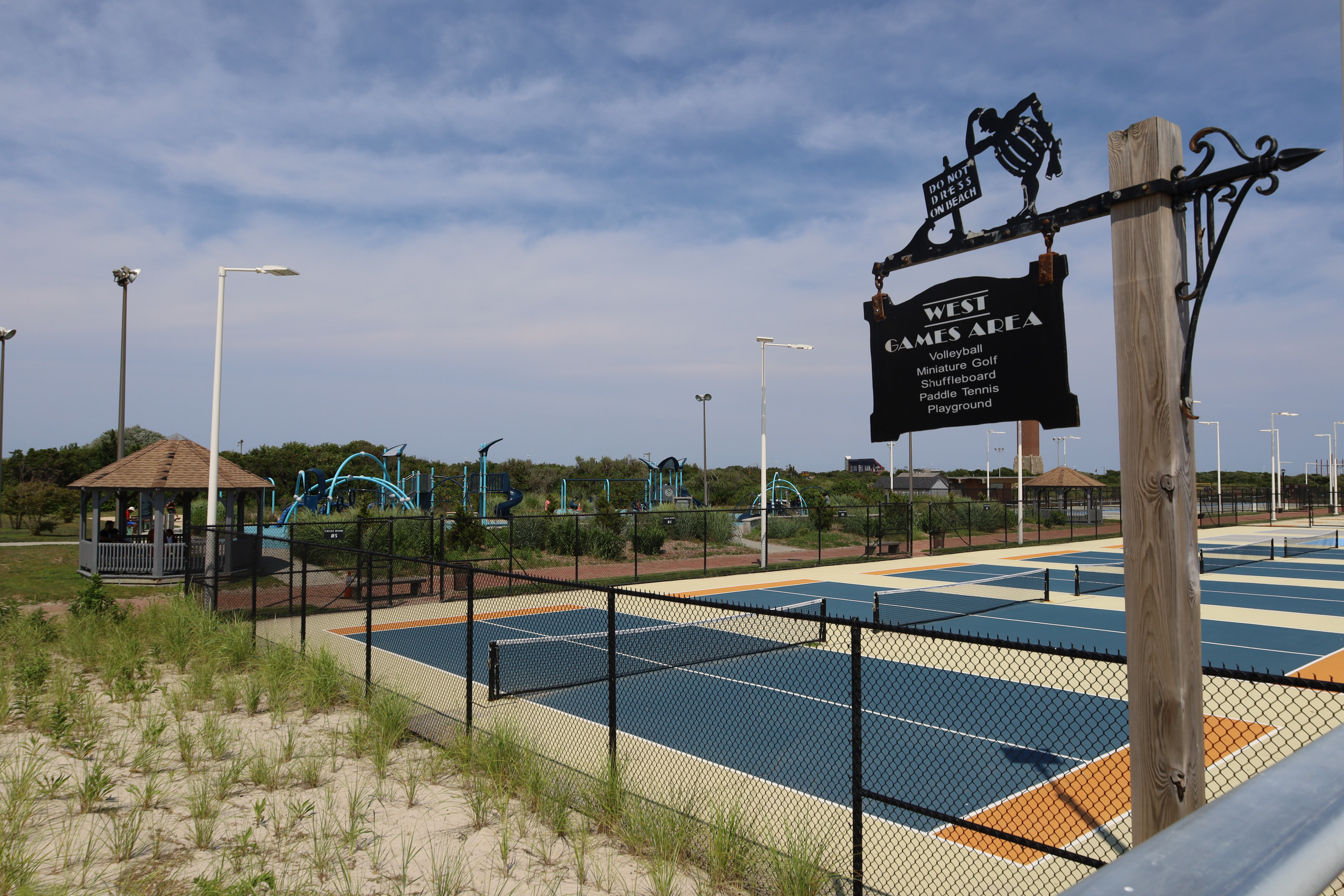
West Games Area featuring tennis courts

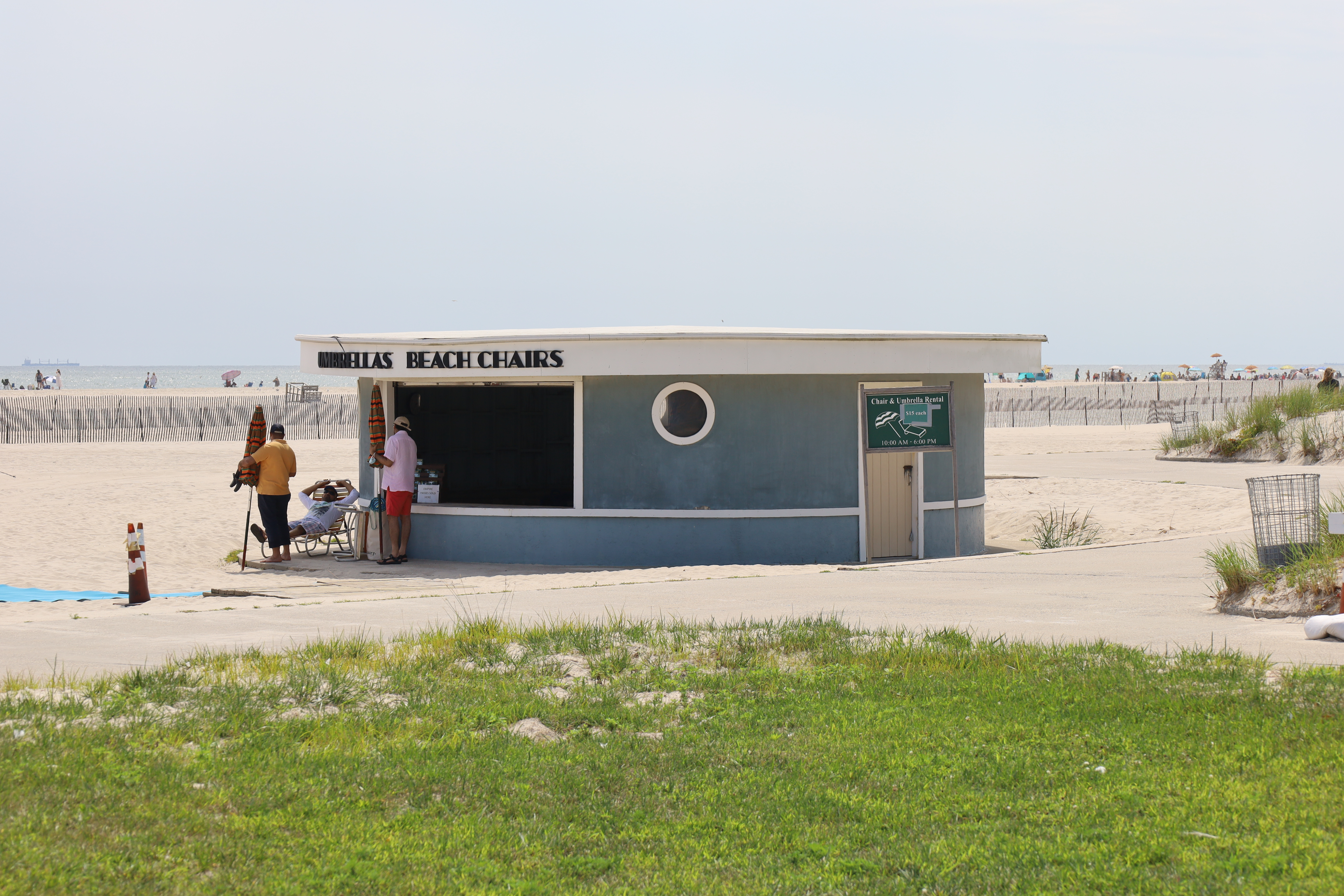
An umbrella and beach chair stand

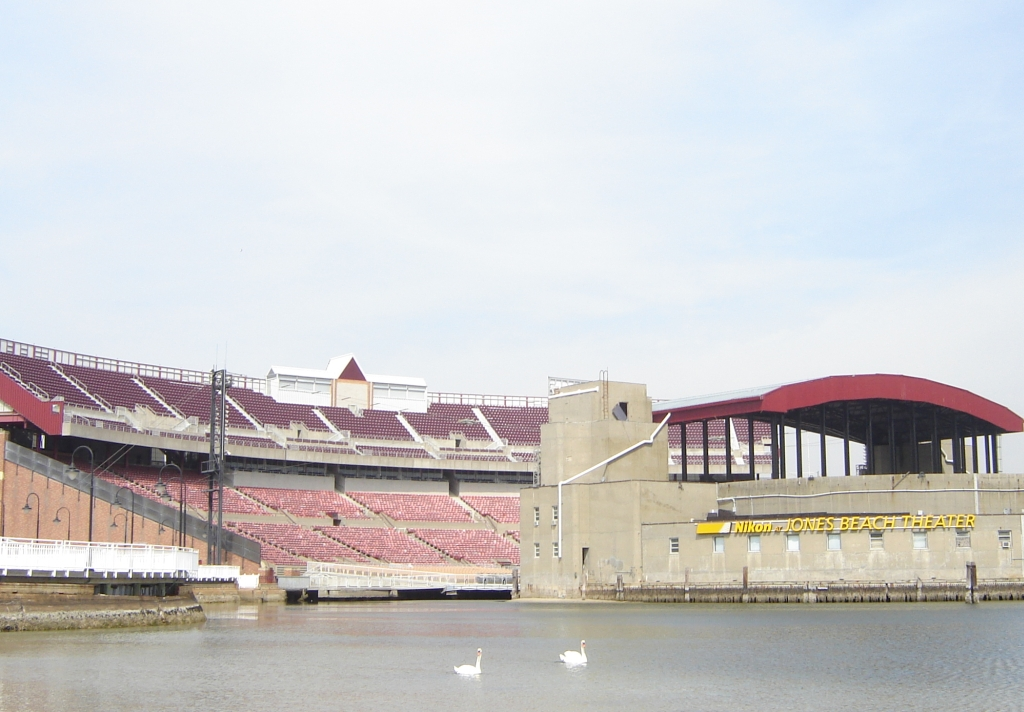
Northwell Health at Jones Beach Theater

=== Restaurants and concessions ===
There are multiple concession stands along the boardwalk in season. A few of the larger concessions stay open past the main summer season. Beach dining and catering facilities no longer exist at Jones Beach.

Jones Beach formerly featured The Boardwalk Cafe, a large restaurant with an expansive ocean view, built in 1966 and demolished in 2004 due to damage from erosion. It was intended to be replaced with a $40 million, 1,500-seat, 70,000-square-foot (6,500 m^{2}) restaurant/catering hall called "Trump on the Ocean", to be operated by then-real estate mogul (and later, President) Donald Trump and catering impresario Steven Carl. The project was stalled for several years due to legal battles over permits required for the restaurant's planned basement, and was eventually cancelled in the aftermath of Hurricane Sandy.

Restaurant, catering, and cafeteria/concession services have been redeveloped and re-opened. Gatsby's is a restaurant and catering event venue that opened in June 2019 and has re-opened post covid. The Boardwalk Cafe restaurant opened in 2018, and has also re-opened post covid. They also have a boardwalk bar and cafeteria that have opened, and a small gelato stand.

=== Parking fields ===
Jones Beach's West End originally featured two parking fields known as West End 1, which was closed permanently in 1992 and replaced by the Theodore Roosevelt Nature Center after lying abandoned for nearly a decade, and West End 2, which lies at the westernmost area of the state park adjacent to the jetty on Jones' Inlet. As of 2021 the Theodore Roosevelt Nature Center has been closed and replaced by the new Energy & Nature center at West End 2. West End 2 is also currently a designated surfing area, which is open to stargazers and fishermen at night and bird watchers and other naturalists by day. The West End 2 beach was closed in April 2009 because of the state fiscal crisis. The West End 2 parking field along with the Field 1 are the two largest ocean front parking areas currently extant in the park. During the COVID-19 pandemic, a drive thru testing site was established in the West End 1 parking field, resulting in the area being closed to all recreational activity until further notice.

== Transportation ==
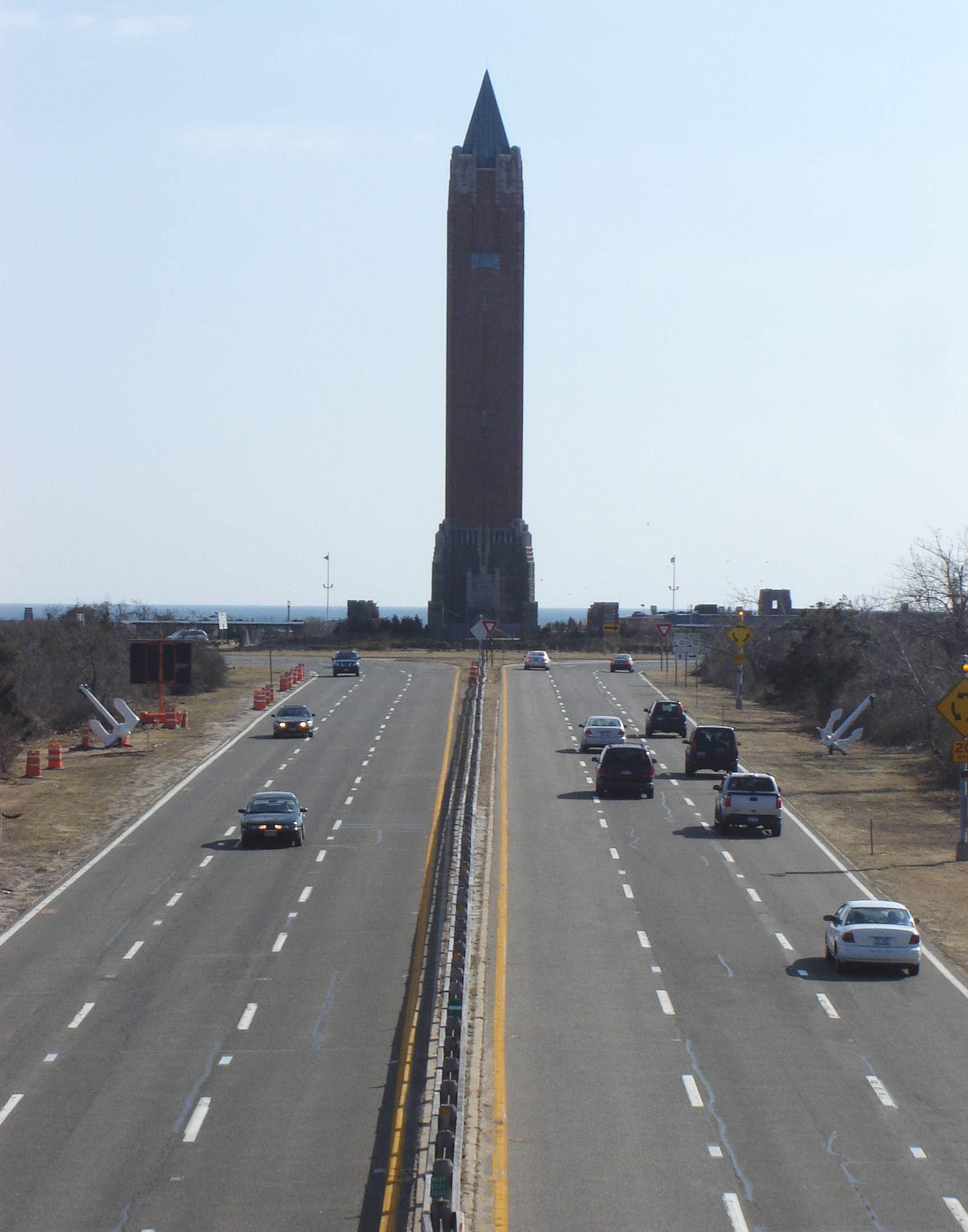
Wantagh Parkway approach to Jones Beach. Centered is the Jones Beach Water Tower

Jones Beach is accessible by car, boat, bicycle, and in the summer season by bus. Most visitors arrive by car via the Meadowbrook State Parkway or the Wantagh State Parkway; the recreation area is also accessible via the Ocean Parkway. A significant portion of visitors take the Long Island Rail Road (LIRR) to Freeport and then the Nassau Inter-County Express's (NICE) n88X bus to Jones Beach.
