= John Bittrolff =

American murderer and suspected serial killer

- Suffolk Co. Police Dept. 2014 mugshot
- Born: July 1, 1966 (age 60); New York, U.S.
- Status: Incarcerated
- Conviction: Second degree murder (2 counts)
- Penalty: 50 years to life imprisonment

Details
- Victims: 2
- Span of crimes: 1993–1994
- Country: United States
- State: New York
- Date apprehended: July 21, 2014
- Imprisoned at: Clinton Correctional Facility

John Bittrolff (born July 1, 1966) is an American convicted murderer and former suspect in the Gilgo Beach serial killings case. In July 2014, he was charged with the murders of Rita Tangredi and Colleen McNamee. He was also a suspect in the murder of a third woman, Sandra Costilla, prior to the capture of serial killer Rex Heuermann. Bittrolff became a suspect in the unsolved murders after his brother, Timothy Bittrolff, was partially matched to DNA found on the bodies in 2013. Timothy Bittrolff submitted the sample after violating an unrelated order of protection, in 2013.

On July 5, 2017, Bittrolff was found guilty of the second degree murders of Tangredi and McNamee. He was sentenced to 50 years to life in prison on September 12, 2017. He is imprisoned at Clinton Correctional Facility. His department identification number is 17A3925.

== Victims ==
Bittrolff was convicted of killing two women and was a suspect in the death of a third.

=== Rita Tangredi ===
Tangredi was found dead on November 2, 1993, in Suffolk County, New York. Tangredi lived in East Patchogue and was known by police to be a sex worker.

=== Colleen McNamee ===
McNamee's body was found on January 30, 1994, in Shirley, New York, also in Suffolk County. Believed by authorities to be a sex worker, she was beaten, strangled to death and left naked in the woods, near the William Floyd Parkway.

=== Sandra Costilla ===
Costilla's body was found on November 20, 1993, in North Sea, New York. On June 6, 2024, Gilgo Beach serial killings suspect Rex Heuermann was charged with Costilla's murder.

== Former suspect in Long Island serial killings ==
After Bittrolff's sentence, the case's prosecutor announced that Bittrolff was also a suspect in at least one of the 10 murders attributed to the Long Island serial killer in New York's Suffolk and Nassau counties. Suffolk County District Attorney's office prosecutor Robert Biancavilla released a statement noting that Bittrolff was likely responsible for the deaths of other women, and that, "There are remains of the victims at Gilgo that may be attributed to the handiwork of Mr. Bittrolff, and that investigation is continuing".

Bittrolff was a carpenter who lived in Manorville, where the torsos of Jessica Taylor and Valerie Mack were recovered. The remains were discovered roughly three miles away from Bittrolff's home. He also reportedly once "cut out the heart of a deer he had just shot and ate it raw in the woods."

On July 13, 2023, another man, Rex Heuermann, a long-time resident of Massapequa Park on Long Island, was arrested and subsequently charged with six murders attributed to the Long Island serial killer, including for the murders of Melissa Barthelemy and Sandra Costilla.

On June 6, 2024, the prosecutors revealed in a news conference that the death of Sandra Costilla followed a blueprint found at Heuermann's home, more securely assuring that John Bittrolff was innocent of killing Costilla. They also confirmed that the deaths of the other Long Island victims followed this same blueprint.

Following this discovery, Bittrolff requested that Heuermann's DNA be tested against hair samples found on the bodies of Tangredi and McNamee, hoping that the testing would implicate Heuermann rather than himself in the killings. A DNA test was performed which excluded Heuermann as a suspect in the murder of McNamee, and Bittrolff remained imprisoned.

== See also ==
- List of serial killers in the United States
