= Thomas Spota =

American lawyer

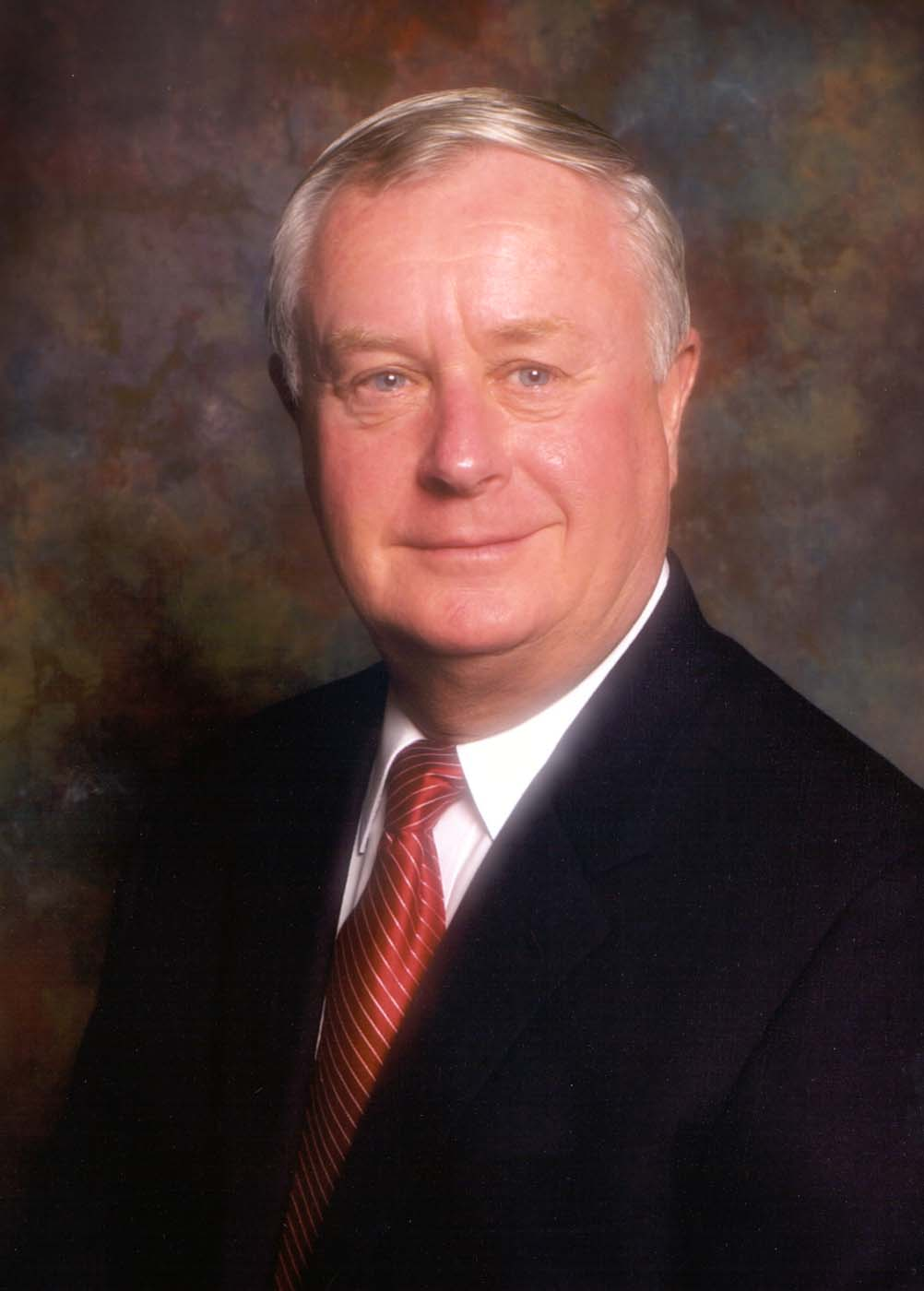

District Attorney of Suffolk County
- In office January 1, 2002 – November 10, 2017
- Preceded by: James M. Catterson, Jr.
- Succeeded by: Emily Constant
- Constituency: Suffolk County, New York

Personal details
- Born: September 6, 1941 (age 85) New York, U.S.
- Party: Democratic
- Education: Fairfield University (BA); St. John's University (JD)

Thomas Joseph Spota III (born September 6, 1941) is an American convicted criminal and former attorney and politician, who served as the District Attorney of Suffolk County, New York, serving from 2002 until 2017, later being disbarred on June 10, 2020. Spota announced his intent to resign on November 10, 2017, following his indictment on federal charges of obstruction of justice in the investigation of Suffolk County Police Chief James Burke. Spota was subsequently found guilty and sentenced to five years in federal prison and fined $100,000.

== Early life and education ==
Spota was born in 1941 and grew up in New Hyde Park, New York, on Long Island. He graduated from Chaminade High School, a private Catholic school in Mineola, New York. He earned degrees at Fairfield University in Fairfield, Connecticut, and St. John's University School of Law in Jamaica, Queens, New York.

== Law career ==
After passing the bar, Spota worked as an assistant prosecutor under Suffolk County District Attorney Patrick Henry, during the 1970s and early 1980s. He entered private law practice in Suffolk, representing clients including the Suffolk Detectives Association and other law enforcement unions.

Following his conviction on federal corruption charges, Spota was disbarred in 2020. Since August 2024, Spota has worked part time as a "non attorney" administrative clerk, for the law firm of his former criminal attorney.

== Personal ==
He lived in Mount Sinai, New York, with his wife. They have three grown children.

== District Attorney of Suffolk County ==
In 2001 Republican-turned-Democrat Spota ran for District Attorney, and defeated three-time incumbent James M. Catterson Jr in November 2001, taking 58% of the vote. He was reelected in 2005, and again in 2009 without any major-party opposition. Spota has been active in the fight against the distribution of child pornography over the Internet. In 2003, Spota indicted twelve Suffolk residents who used KaZaA, a file-sharing program to spread child pornography. Spota was called to testify before the United States Senate Committee on the Judiciary on September 9, 2003, at a hearing concerning "Pornography, Technology, and Process: Problems and Solutions on Peer-to-Peer Networks." Spota recommended a new federal task force and said that legislation was needed to "attack the owners and the distributors of these programs, who are reaping enormous profits."

From December 2010, his office oversaw the investigation of numerous homicides in Suffolk County, believed to have been perpetrated by a single unidentified person, known as the Long Island serial killer, or LISK. The investigation began after ten sets of human remains were uncovered on or adjacent to Gilgo Beach on the South Shore; most of the victims were missing sex workers and investigators believed at least several of the murders were related. In July 2023, after Spotta left office, a breakthrough was finally made when Long Island architect Rex Heuermann, was arrested and charged, initially with three of the murders. By December 2024, Heuermann had been indicted by Suffolk County District Attorney for a total of seven of the murders.

Among the successful cases prosecuted by his office was the conviction in May 2017 of John Bittrolff, a Manorville carpenter charged with the homicides of sex workers Rita Tangredi and Colleen McNamee, whose bodies were found on area South Shore beaches in 1993 and 1994, respectively.

== Criminal charges and conviction ==
In May 2013 the FBI and the US Attorney's Office opened an investigation into alleged actions by James Burke, Chief of the Suffolk County Police Department: the alleged assault of a suspect in police custody, a subsequent cover-up, and coercion of witnesses. The former chief pleaded guilty to reduced charges in February 2016.

The federal inquiry subsequently expanded beyond Burke to investigate a broader pattern of corruption in both the police department and the office of the Suffolk County district attorney, Thomas J. Spota. In October 2017, Spota and an aide were indicted on charges of obstructing the investigation of James Burke for police brutality. In a public statement released the following day, Spota maintained his innocence but announced he had decided to step down before the end of his term. On November 10, 2017, after sixteen years in office, Spota resigned as the District Attorney of Suffolk County. Almost exactly two years later, in November 2019, Spota's criminal trial finally began in East Islip, NY, with Federal District Court Judge Joan Marie Azrack presiding. Spota was tried jointly beside Christopher McPartland, who had served as chief of the anti-corruption bureau at Suffolk County District Attorney's office under Spota's administration. On December 17, 2019, the jury convicted Spota on federal charges of obstruction, witness tampering, and conspiracy. Following the verdict, Spota unsuccessfully attempted to appeal his conviction but was released on bail pending sentencing. In June 2020, he was disbarred by order of the New York Supreme Court. After multiple delays, Spota's sentencing hearing finally proceeded in April 2021. Federal prosecutors asked that Spota and McPartland both be sentenced to 20 years in prison. On August 10, 2021, the federal judge overseeing the case sentenced Spota to 5 years in federal prison and a fine of $100,000. Spotta was incarcerated at FCI Danbury, in Connecticut. He remained there until being released in July 2024, having served less than three and half years of his five year sentence. By the terms of his release, Spotta was to remain domiciled at a halfway house until March 2025.

== See also ==
- List of district attorneys by county
