= Gilgo-Oak Beach-Captree, New York =

- Former Census-designated place
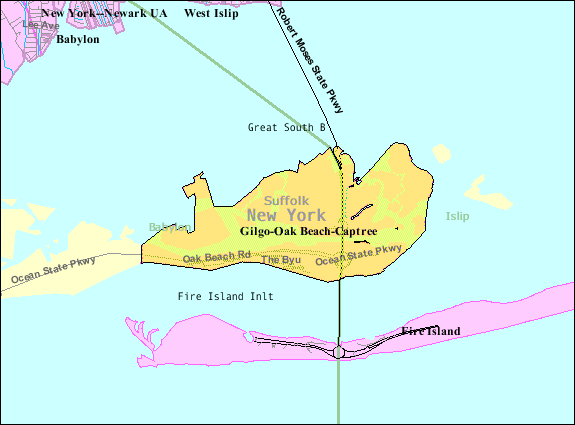
- U.S. Census Map

- Location within the state of New York
- Coordinates: 40°38′28″N 73°16′42″W
- Country: United States
- State: New York
- County: Suffolk
- Towns: Babylon; Islip

Area
  - Total: 3.6 sq mi (9.4 km^{2})
  - Land: 2.7 sq mi (7.1 km^{2})
  - Water: 0.93 sq mi (2.4 km^{2})

Population (2000)
  - Total: 333
  - Density: 122/sq mi (47.2/km^{2})
- Time zone: UTC-5 (Eastern (EST))
  - Summer (DST): UTC-4 (EDT)
- Area codes: 631, 934
- FIPS code: 36-28997

Gilgo-Oak Beach-Captree, frequently just called Oak Beach, was a census-designated place (CDP) in Suffolk County, New York within the Town of Babylon. The population was 333 at the time of 2000 census.

== History ==
Following the 2010 census, the area was delineated as two CDPs: Gilgo and Oak Beach–Captree. The original CDP contained several small beach communities on a barrier island along the southern edge of Long Island. In order from west to east, these included West Gilgo Beach (on the Nassau/Suffolk county border), Gilgo Beach, Cedar Beach (no residences), Oak Beach (including the Oak Island Beach Association), Oak Island and Captree Island. They are connected to the mainland by Ocean Parkway from the west and Robert Moses State Parkway from the north.

Prior to the 2020 census, the Oak Beach-Captree CDP was further split into the Oak Beach and Captree CDPs.

== Geography ==
According to the United States Census Bureau, the CDP had a total area of 3.7 square miles (9.6 km^{2}), of which 2.7 square miles (7.0 km^{2}) was land and 0.9 square miles (2.3 km^{2}), or 25.21%, is water.

== Demographics ==
As of the census of 2000, there were 333 people, 161 households, and 94 families residing in the CDP. The population density was 122.1 inhabitants per square mile (47.1/km^{2}). There were 305 housing units at an average density of 111.9 per square mile (43.2/km^{2}). The racial makeup of the CDP was 97.00% White, 0.30% African American and 2.70% Asian. Hispanic or Latino of any race were 1.80% of the population.

There were 161 households, out of which 14.9% had children under the age of 18 living with them, 50.9% were married couples living together, 6.2% had a female householder with no husband present, and 41.0% were non-families. 34.8% of all households were made up of individuals, and 11.8% had someone living alone who was 65 years of age or older. The average household size was 2.07 and the average family size was 2.64.

In the CDP, the population was spread out, with 13.5% under the age of 18, 1.5% from 18 to 24, 28.8% from 25 to 44, 34.8% from 45 to 64, and 21.3% who were 65 years of age or older. The median age was 48 years. For every 100 females, there were 109.4 males. For every 100 females age 18 and over, there were 100.0 males.

The median income for a household in the CDP was $66,250, and the median income for a family was $105,870. Males had a median income of $61,250 versus $37,083 for females. The per capita income for the CDP was $55,813. None of the families and 0.9% of the population were living below the poverty line, including no under eighteens and none of those over 64.

The census numbers are presumably for full-time inhabitants; many of these houses are second homes and not primary residences, although the proportion of seasonal residents is decreasing.

The land for these communities is not privately owned, but leased from the State of New York through the year 2050. However, the residences on the property are owned. If the leases are not renewed at some point in the future, the owners will have to move the houses elsewhere, similar to what happened at High Hill Beach when Jones Beach was created.

== See also ==
- Oak Beach–Captree, New York
- Setauket-East Setauket, New York
