= Gilgo Beach serial killings =

American serial killer case (1993–2010)

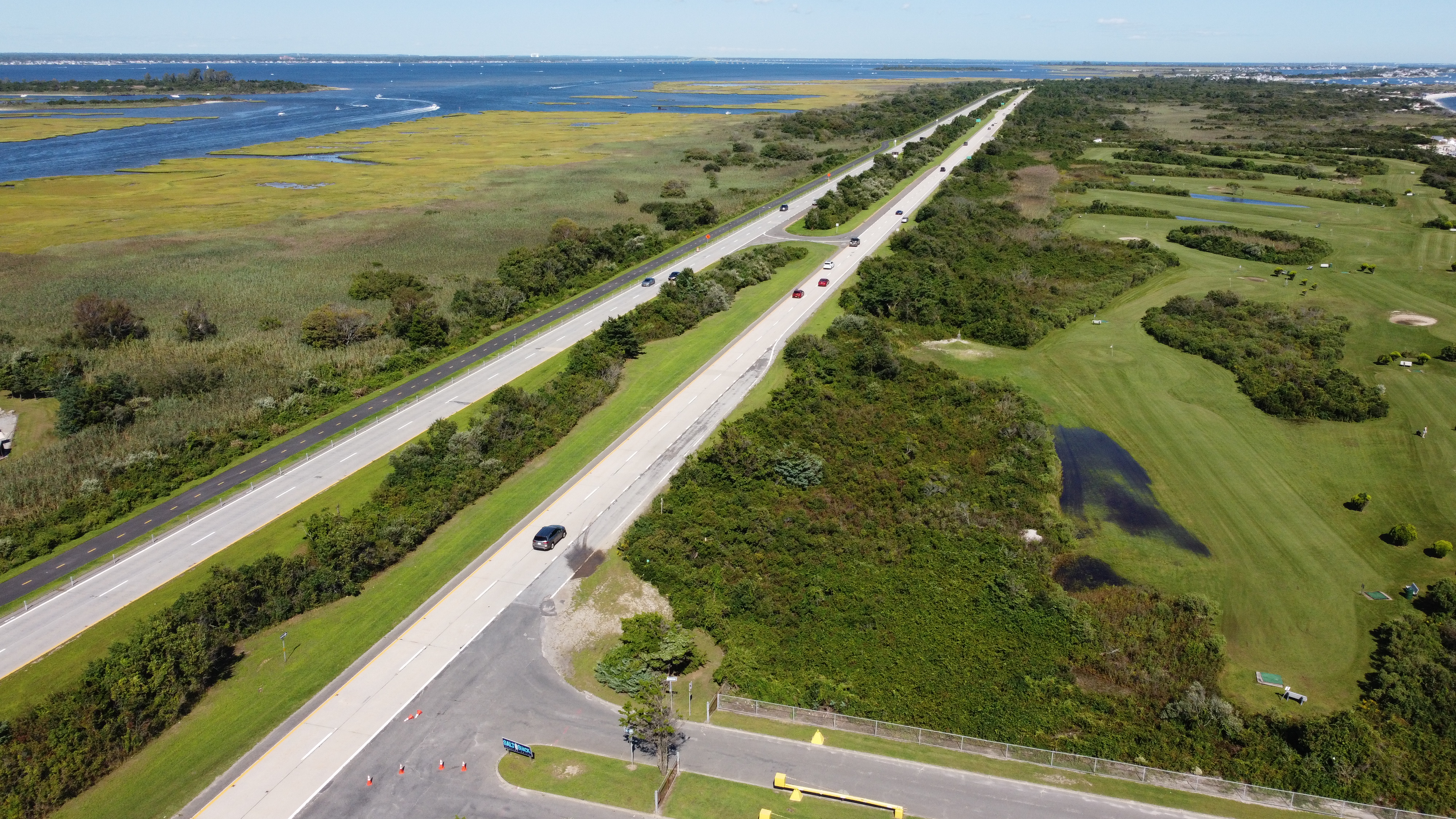
- An aerial view of the Ocean Parkway road where 10 of the 11 bodies linked to the Gilgo Beach serial killings were found buried in the shrubbery, marshes and trees along this transport route.
- Location: Suffolk County, New York, United States
- Date: 1993–2010
- Attack type: Serial killing, Violence against prostitutes
- Victims: 11+
- Perpetrator: Rex Heuermann (at least 8 murders)
- Verdict: Heuermann pleaded guilty to 7 murders
- Convictions: First-degree murder (3 counts); Second-degree murder (7 counts; three lesser included offenses and four individual charges)
- Sentence: Seven consecutive life sentences without the possibility of parole (Note: Three of the seven sentences without any possibility of parole, four of the seven sentences with the possibility of parole after 100 years.)

The Gilgo Beach serial killings were a series of murders on Long Island, New York, between 1993 and 2010. The case gained national attention in late 2010 and 2011, when police searching for a missing woman, Shannan Gilbert, discovered the remains of ten victims along Ocean Parkway near Gilgo Beach and in nearby areas of Suffolk and Nassau counties. Four of these victims—Melissa Barthelemy, Maureen Brainard‑Barnes, Megan Waterman, and Amber Lynn Costello—were found in December 2010 in close proximity and became known as the "Gilgo Four". Six additional sets of remains were located in March and April 2011, several of which were later connected to earlier unsolved cases.

Gilbert's disappearance in May 2010 prompted the initial search, though her cause of death remains disputed and is not conclusively linked to the other victims. Between 2023 and 2024, Rex Heuermann, a Manhattan architectural consultant and resident of Massapequa Park, was charged with seven of the murders; those of the Gilgo Four as well as the killings of Sandra Costilla, Valerie Mack, and Jessica Taylor. In April 2026, Heuermann pleaded guilty to seven murders and admitted to an eighth, that of Karen Vergata. In June 2026, Heuermann was sentenced to life in prison without parole. He is currently incarcerated at Clinton Correctional Facility in Dannemora, New York.

== Perpetrator ==
=== Background ===
Rex Andrew Heuermann was born on September 13, 1963, in Massapequa Park, New York, a village on the South Shore of Long Island, to Theodore and Dolores Heuermann. Childhood acquaintances of Heuermann recalled him as being a "momma's boy" who was extremely close to his mother, whom they characterized as controlling. His father, a former Merrick resident, World War II veteran and former second lieutenant in the United States Air Force, died in 1975, when Heuermann was twelve years old. Heuermann purchased his childhood home from his mother in 1994 for $170,000 and continued living in the residence until his arrest in 2023. Neighbors commented on the house's increasingly dilapidated appearance during the intervening years, in comparison to more upscale surrounding homes.

Heuermann graduated in 1981 from Berner High School in Massapequa Park, where another member of his senior class was actor William Baldwin. He studied architecture at the New York Institute of Technology and, by 1987, was working for an architectural firm in Manhattan.

Heuermann married his first wife on September 29, 1990, in New Brunswick, New Jersey; the marriage ended in divorce in 1994. He married his second wife, Asa Ellerup, in April 1996 and lived with her and their two children prior to his arrest; Ellerup filed for divorce in 2023.

=== Investigation ===
Authorities began to consider Heuermann a suspect in March 2022 after determining that a dark green first‑generation Chevrolet Avalanche registered in his name matched a vehicle described by a witness in one of the killings.

Investigators stated that Heuermann's cellphone records showed contact with three of the four victims, and an email account linked to him had been used to search for information about the investigation. Court records also indicated that he had searched online for "sadistic materials, child pornography, [and] images of the victims and their relatives".

DNA testing showed a potential match between DNA recovered from a discarded pizza crust and DNA found on hair collected from burlap used to wrap one of the victims. A potential match to Heuermann's wife was also identified, when comparing hair found on or near three victims to samples taken from bottles recovered from the trash outside the Heuermann residence. Investigators stated that Heuermann's wife and children were out of state during each of the periods when the killings are believed to have occurred.

=== Charges ===
On July 13, 2023, Heuermann was arrested and charged with three counts of first‑degree murder and three counts of second‑degree murder in connection with the deaths of Melissa Barthelemy (24, killed 2009), Megan Waterman (22, killed 2010), and Amber Costello (27, killed 2010).

In January 2024, Heuermann was charged with the murder of Maureen Brainard‑Barnes, 25, who disappeared in 2007.

On June 6, 2024, Heuermann was arraigned and charged with the murders of Jessica Taylor (20, killed 2003) and Sandra Costilla (28, killed 1993). Costilla's murder had not previously been linked to the Gilgo Beach serial killings. This development extended the timeline of the case back to the early 1990s, much earlier than previously believed by investigators.

=== Plea and court proceedings ===
On April 8, 2026, Heuermann pleaded guilty to the seven murders with which he had been charged (Melissa Barthelemy, Valerie Mack, Jessica Taylor, Megan Waterman, Amber Lynn Costello, Maureen Brainard-Barnes, and Sandra Costilla) and admitted to committing an eighth murder: that of Karen Vergata. On June 17, 2026, Heuermann was sentenced to life in prison without the possibility of parole. Heuermann was not charged with the disappearance and death of Shannan Gilbert, whose search by investigators led to the discovery of the remains of the Gilgo Beach homicide victims.

== Victims ==
=== Sandra Costilla ===
Sandra Costilla was a 28-year-old woman from Trinidad and Tobago who was killed on November 19 or 20 in 1993. In December 2024, 31 years after her death, Heuermann was charged with her murder. DNA from hairs found on her body matched Heuermann's.

Costilla was living in New York City at the time of her disappearance. Her body was discovered in November 1993 by hunters in a wooded area in North Sea, Long Island, approximately 60 miles (97 km) northeast of Gilgo Beach. She is the earliest known victim included in the murder charges against Heuermann, suggesting that he allegedly began killing in the 1990s or earlier and that he disposed of bodies in locations beyond the Gilgo Beach area.

=== The Gilgo Four: victims discovered in December 2010 ===
==== Maureen Brainard-Barnes ====
Maureen Brainard-Barnes of Norwich, Connecticut, was 25 when she disappeared. She was last seen on July 9, 2007, saying she planned "to spend the day in New York City." She was not seen again. Brainard-Barnes worked as a seasonal telemarketer and turned to sex work when unable to find other employment. A mother of two, she advertised as a sex worker on Craigslist to pay her mortgage. She had been out of the sex industry for seven months but returned after receiving an eviction notice. Her body was found in December 2010. She had been restrained with three leather belts, and DNA found on one of the belts matched the wife of Heuermann.

Shortly after her disappearance, her friend Sara Karnes received a call from a man using a blocked number. He claimed he had seen Brainard-Barnes and that she was alive and staying at a "whorehouse in Queens". He refused to identify himself or provide the location. Karnes asked him to call back from an identifiable number so police could act on the information; he said he would but never called again. Karnes reported that the man had no discernible regional accent.

At the time she disappeared, Brainard-Barnes was working from a Super 8 motel in Manhattan. On the night of July 9, 2007, she called a friend in Connecticut and said she planned to meet a client outside the motel. Like many of the victims, she was very petite, at 4 ft 11 in (1.50 m) and 105 pounds (48 kg).

==== Melissa Barthelemy ====
Melissa Barthelemy, 24, of Erie County, New York, went missing on July 12, 2009. She had been living in the Bronx and working as a sex worker through Craigslist. She was known to use the alias "Chloe". On the night she disappeared, she met with a client, deposited $900 in her bank account, and attempted to call an ex‑boyfriend but did not reach him. Beginning one week later and continuing for five weeks, her 15‑year‑old sister received a series of "vulgar, mocking, and insulting" calls from a man—possibly the killer—using Barthelemy's phone.

The calls escalated and culminated in the caller telling her sister that Barthelemy was dead and that he was going to "watch her rot". Police traced some calls to Madison Square Garden, Midtown Manhattan, and Massapequa but were unable to identify the caller. Barthelemy's mother noted that there were "a lot of calls to Manorville" from her daughter's phone around the time she disappeared. Barthelemy was 4 ft 10 in (1.47 m) and 95 pounds (43 kg). Her remains were the first discovered during the search for Shannan Gilbert.

==== Megan Waterman ====
Megan Waterman, 22, of Scarborough, Maine, went missing on June 6, 2010, after posting escort advertisements on Craigslist. The previous day, she told her boyfriend she was going out and would call him later. At the time, she was staying at a motel in Hauppauge, New York, 15 miles (24 km) northeast of Gilgo Beach. Waterman was reported missing on June 8, 2010, after failing to check in on her three‑year‑old daughter, whom she had left with family. Her body was recovered in December 2010.

Waterman was a victim of sex trafficking. Her boyfriend was arrested on sex trafficking charges on April 11, 2012; he is not believed to be connected to her disappearance or death.

==== Amber Lynn Costello ====
Amber Lynn Costello, 27, of West Babylon, New York, went missing on September 2, 2010, after leaving to meet a stranger who had called her several times and offered $2,500 for her services. Her remains were later found on December 13, 2010. Before moving to West Babylon, Costello lived with her second husband in Clearwater, Florida, and worked as a waitress. She had been a strong student but became addicted to drugs as a teenager. She had been sexually assaulted by a neighbor at age six. Costello was 4 ft 11 in (1.50 m) and weighed approximately 100 pounds (45 kg). Her family believed she was in a residential drug rehabilitation center at the time she went missing. They did not immediately report her missing when she stopped responding to messages and calls.

Costello's roommate provided police with a description of the unknown client and the first‑generation Chevrolet Avalanche he was driving. More than a decade later, this information helped lead investigators to Heuermann as a suspect. Born in Charlotte and raised in Wilmington, North Carolina, Costello was living in West Babylon with several other heroin users when she disappeared.

=== Additional six victims discovered in March and April 2011 ===
Four additional sets of remains were discovered on March 29 and April 4, 2011. All were found in another area off the parkway near Oak Beach and Gilgo Beach, within 2 miles (3.2 km) east of the remains located in December 2010. These victims were Jessica Taylor, Valerie Mack, Tanya Jackson, and Jackson's daughter, Tatiana Dykes. Suffolk County Police Department subsequently expanded the search area to the Nassau County border in an effort to locate more victims. Mack was not identified until 2020, and Jackson and Dykes were not identified until 2024.

Two additional sets of remains were found on April 11, 2011, after the search expanded into Nassau County. They were located about 1 mile (1.6 km) apart and approximately 5 miles (8.0 km) west of the remains discovered in December. One set belonged to a victim with XY chromosomes who may have been a crossdresser or a transgender woman. Police referred to this victim as "Asian Doe" based on forensic evidence indicating Asian ancestry. Investigators estimated that the victim had been dead for between five and ten years. The other set of remains belonged to "Jane Doe No. 7", whose partial remains had been found on Fire Island in 1996. Jane Doe No. 7 was identified as Karen Vergata in 2023.

==== Valerie Mack ("Melissa Taylor"/"Manorville Jane Doe"/"Jane Doe No. 6") ====
Valerie Mack, 24, also known as Melissa Taylor, was living in Philadelphia and working as an escort when she went missing in 2000. Like many of the victims, she was small in stature, approximately 5 ft (1.5 m), and weighed approximately 100 pounds (45 kg). Mack had been in foster care from an early age and was never reported missing. She was the mother of a young son.

Mack's partial remains were discovered in Manorville, New York, east of Gilgo Beach, on November 19, 2000. They were not identified until 2020. Her torso was found wrapped in garbage bags and dumped in the woods near the intersection of Halsey Manor Road and Mill Road, adjacent to power lines and a nearby access road.

A head, right foot, and hands found on April 4, 2011, were initially classified as belonging to an unidentified victim known as "Jane Doe No. 6". In 2020, officials determined that these remains belonged to the same woman whose torso had been found in 2000.

On May 28, 2020, police announced that the remains had been identified as Valerie Mack, who had last been seen by family members in the spring or summer of 2000 in the Port Republic, New Jersey, area.

The dismembered remains of Mack and Jessica Taylor were disposed of in a similar manner and in the same part of Manorville, suggesting a possible link. Although Mack sometimes used the alias Melissa Taylor, she and Jessica Taylor were not related.

On December 17, 2024, the Suffolk County District Attorney's Office indicted Heuermann for Mack's murder.

==== Jessica Taylor ====
Jessica Taylor, 20, was living in Manhattan when she went missing on July 21, 2003. On July 26, her torso was discovered 45 miles (72 km) east of Gilgo Beach in Manorville, New York, and was identified later that year through DNA analysis. Her torso was found atop a pile of scrap wood at the end of a paved access road off Halsey Manor Road, just north of the Long Island Expressway. Plastic sheeting was found beneath the torso, and a tattoo on her body had been mutilated with a sharp instrument. Additional remains found on March 29, 2011—including her skull, hands, and forearm—were matched to Taylor.

Taylor worked as a sex worker in Washington, D.C. and Manhattan. She was last seen working near the Port Authority Bus Terminal in Manhattan between July 18 and 22.

==== Karen Vergata ("Fire Island Jane Doe"/"Jane Doe No. 7") ====
Karen Vergata, a 34-year-old woman from Manhattan, is believed to have been working as a sex worker when she disappeared in 1996. She was last seen around February 14, 1996, and was never reported missing. Unidentified for 27 years, she was known as "Jane Doe No. 7" and "Fire Island Jane Doe" until she was identified through genetic genealogy in 2023.

Vergata's severed legs were found in a garbage bag on Fire Island, east of Gilgo Beach, on April 20, 1996. Fifteen years later, on April 11, 2011, her skull and several teeth were recovered at Tobay Beach—the second set of remains found in Nassau County that day. DNA testing linked these remains to those found on Fire Island in 1996. It has been suggested that Vergata's legs may have drifted to Fire Island after her remains were dumped on Long Island.

==== Unidentified victim ("Asian Doe") ====
The body of a young Asian person who had died from blunt‑force trauma was discovered on April 4, 2011, at Gilgo Beach, very close to where the first four sets of remains had been found in December 2010. The victim had XY chromosomes and was found wearing women's clothing, suggesting that they may have been a transgender woman. The victim was estimated to be between 17 and 23 years old, between 5 ft 3 in (1.60 m) and 5 ft 9 in (1.75 m) in height, missing four teeth, and may have had a musculoskeletal condition affecting gait. The victim was likely ethnically Han Chinese. Investigators estimated that the victim had been dead for between five and ten years. A male‑presenting composite sketch was released by police in September 2011, and a female‑presenting rendering was released in September 2024.

==== Victims in separate case: Tanya Jackson ("Peaches"/"Jane Doe No. 3") and Tatiana Dykes ("Baby Doe") ====
Tanya Denise Jackson, born in Alabama on October 22, 1970, was a US army veteran who was living in Brooklyn in 1997 when she disappeared along with her two-year-old daughter, Tatiana Marie Dykes. Jackson's partial remains were discovered in Lakeview, New York in 1997. Additional remains were found in Jones Beach State Park in 2011, along with those of Dykes. Unidentified for 28 years, Jackson and Dykes were identified in early 2025. In December 2025, Tatiana Dykes' father, Andrew Dykes, was arrested and charged with the murders of Jackson and their daughter. Police no longer believe the deaths are connected to the Long Island serial killings.

On June 28, 1997, Jackson's dismembered torso was found at Hempstead Lake State Park in Lakeview, New York. Her torso had been placed inside a green plastic Rubbermaid container that had been dumped beside a road along the west side of the lake. Investigators reported that she had a tattoo on her left breast depicting a heart‑shaped peach with a bite taken out of it and two drips falling from the core, which led to the nickname "Peaches".

On April 11, 2011, police discovered dismembered skeletal remains inside a plastic bag near Jones Beach State Park. The victim was designated "Jane Doe No. 3". In December 2016, DNA analysis confirmed that "Peaches" and "Jane Doe No. 3" were the same person. DNA testing also identified "Peaches" as the mother of "Baby Doe", who was found wearing gold jewelry similar to her mother's.

Jackson had served in the Army from July 1993 to February 1995. She was estranged from her family and was never reported missing. On December 5, 2025, Andrew Dykes of Tampa, Florida was arrested for Jackson's murder and waiting for extradition. Dykes, a former United States Army anatomy instructor and Florida state police trooper, was the father of Tatiana Dykes and married to another woman at the time of his relationship with Jackson, having met while they were stationed at Fort Sam Houston. He was not charged in the killing of Tatiana, but investigators believe he was responsible for both deaths. Dykes was identified earlier following the identification of Jackson and Tatiana, but was not initially considered a suspect due to his cooperation with authorities.

== Police investigations ==
=== Disappearance of Shannan Gilbert ===
On May 1, 2010, Shannan Gilbert, a 24‑year‑old escort, was working at a client's residence in a gated community in Oak Beach on Jones Beach Island in Suffolk County. At 4:51 a.m., Gilbert called 911 from the property of the client, Joseph Brewer, telling the dispatcher that someone was "after her" and that "they" were trying to kill her, but did not provide her location. She ran to a nearby home and was let inside, but fled again when asked to wait for police. She was last seen shortly afterward, banging on the front door of another residence and screaming for help before running into the night.

In December 2011, 19 months after her disappearance, Gilbert's remains were found in a marsh between Oak Beach and Ocean Parkway, about half a mile from where she had last been seen. The cause of her death remains disputed. In May 2012, Suffolk County medical examiners ruled that Gilbert had accidentally drowned after entering the marsh, though the official autopsy lists the cause of death as "undetermined." Gilbert's mother, Mari Gilbert—who has since died—publicly argued that her daughter had been murdered by a serial killer and criticized police for failing to identify a perpetrator.

Due to the controversy about Gilbert's death, in September 2014, forensic pathologist Michael Baden agreed to conduct an independent autopsy of Gilbert's remains in hopes of determining a clear cause of death. Upon examination of Gilbert's remains, Baden found damage to her hyoid bone suggesting that strangulation may have occurred. Baden also noted that her body was found face-up, which is not common for drowning victims. Nevertheless, her cause of death was listed as "undetermined".

On May 6, 2020, the New York State Supreme Court ordered Suffolk County Police to release Gilbert's 911 call recording, denying their request to withhold it after more than 10 years. On May 13, 2022, the Suffolk County Police Department released the 911 call.

=== Profile of killer ===
According to a 2011 The New York Times article, the perpetrator was most likely a white male in his mid-twenties to mid-forties who was very familiar with the South Shore of Long Island and had access to burlap sacks used to hold the bodies for disposal. Investigators have held various theories on whether there may be more than one killer.

=== FBI involvement ===
On December 10, 2015, Suffolk County Police Commissioner Tim Sini announced that the FBI had officially joined the investigation. The announcement came one day after former police chief James Burke was indicted for civil rights violations and conspiracy. Burke, who had resigned from the department in October 2015, was reported to have blocked FBI involvement in the Gilgo Beach cases for years. The FBI had previously assisted in the search for victims but had never officially been a part of the investigation. In November 2016, Burke was sentenced to 46 months in federal prison for assault and conspiracy. There was considerable other inter-agency friction and failures to cooperate in law enforcement that hindered the investigation over the years.

=== Person of interest ===
On September 12, 2017, Suffolk County prosecutor Robert Biancavilla said that John Bittrolff, a Suffolk County resident convicted of murdering two sex workers and suspected in the murder of a third, may have committed some of the Gilgo Beach murders. Biancavilla said that Bittrolff was likely responsible for the deaths of other women and that there were similarities between the Gilgo Beach crime scenes and Bittrolff's known murders, for which he was convicted in May 2017 and sentenced in September of that year.

Bittrolff was arrested in 2014 after his DNA was found on the bodies of two murder victims, Rita Tangredi and Colleen McNamee, whose bodies were found in 1993 and 1994, respectively. The match had been made through DNA submitted by his brother, who was convicted in 2013 on an unrelated case. Bittrolff was convicted in May 2017 of these murders, and in September sentenced to consecutive terms of 25 years for each murder. The Suffolk County police did not comment on the prosecutor's statement due to the active homicide investigation of the Gilgo Beach murders. Bittrolff's attorney rejected the prosecutor's assertion.

Bittrolff lived in Manorville, where the torsos of Gilgo Beach victims Jessica Taylor and Valerie Mack were recovered. The adult daughter of Rita Tangredi was also the best friend of Melissa Barthelemy, one of the Gilgo Beach victims.

=== 2020 release of evidence to the public ===
On January 16, 2020, Suffolk County Police Commissioner Geraldine Hart released images of a belt found at the crime scene with the letters "HM" or "WH" (depending on the orientation of the belt) embossed in black leather. The belt had been found during the initial investigation near Ocean Parkway in Gilgo Beach. Police believe that the belt was handled by the perpetrator and that it had not belonged to any of the victims. The police revealed few details about the belt's evidentiary value and would not comment on exactly where it had been found. It was also announced that new scientific evidence was being used in the investigation and that they had launched a website enabling the department to share news and receive tips regarding the investigation. However, the website has since been taken down.

== Timeline ==
1990

- September 29, 1990: Heuermann marries first wife, New Brunswick, New Jersey.

1993

- November 19, 1993: Sandra Costilla last seen, New York City, New York.
- November 20, 1993: Remains of Sandra Costilla found, North Sea, New York.

1994

- 1994: Heuermann divorces first wife.

1996

- February 14, 1996: Karen Vergata last seen.
- April 20, 1996: Partial and then-unidentified remains of Karen Vergata found, Fire Island, New York.
- April 1996: Heuermann marries second wife, Asa Ellerup.

1997

- June 28, 1997: Partial and then-unidentified remains of Tanya Jackson found, Hempstead Lake State Park, Lakeview, New York.

2000

- 2000: Valerie Mack last seen by family members in spring or summer, Port Republic, New Jersey.
- November 19, 2000: Partial and then-unidentified remains of Valerie Mack found, Manorville, New York.

2003

- July 21, 2003: Jessica Taylor last seen, Port Authority Bus Terminal, Manhattan, New York.
- July 26, 2003: Partial remains of Jessica Taylor found, Manorville, New York.

2007

- July 9, 2007: Maureen Brainard-Barnes last seen, Manhattan, New York.
- July 2007: A friend of Brainard-Barnes', Sara Karnes, receives a phone call from a man claiming that he had just seen Brainard-Barnes and that she was alive and staying at a "whorehouse in Queens".

2009

- July 12, 2009: Melissa Barthelemy last seen, Unionport, Castle Hill, Bronx, New York.
- July 17, 2009 – August 26, 2009: Amanda Barthelemy, sister of Melissa Barthelemy, receives a series of "vulgar, mocking and insulting" calls from a man using Melissa Barthelemy's cell phone. There are additional calls on July 23, Aug 5, Aug 19 and 26. The caller eventually tells Amanda Barthelemy that her sister is dead.

2010

- May 1, 2010: Shannan Gilbert makes a panicked phone call to 911 after fleeing a client's house; she bangs on the doors of several neighboring houses and disappears, Oak Beach, New York.
- June 6, 2010: Megan Waterman last seen, Hauppauge, New York.
- September 2, 2010: Amber Lynn Costello last seen, West Babylon, New York.
- December 11, 2010: Remains of Melissa Barthelemy found, Ocean Parkway, Long Island, New York.
- December 13, 2010: Remains of Megan Waterman, Amber Lynn Costello, and Maureen Brainard-Barnes found, Ocean Parkway, Long Island, New York.

2011

- March 29, 2011: Further partial remains of Jessica Taylor found, Ocean Parkway, Long Island, New York.
- April 4, 2011: Remains of Valerie Mack, "Asian Doe", and Tatiana Dykes found in brush area, Ocean Parkway, Long Island, New York.
- April 11, 2011: Further partial remains of Tanya Jackson found, Jones Beach State Park, Nassau County, New York.
- April 11, 2011: Further partial remains of Karen Vergata found, Tobay Beach, Nassau County, New York.
- September 20, 2011: "Baby Doe" (later identified as Tatiana Dykes) identified as the daughter of "Peaches" (later identified as Tanya Jackson); partial remains found in 1996 and on April 11 matched to the same person (later identified as Karen Vergata); partial remains found in 2000 and on April 4 matched to the same person (later identified as Valerie Mack); a composite image of the unidentified "Asian Doe" released.
- December 13, 2011: Remains of Shannan Gilbert found in a marsh, Oak Beach, New York.

2012

- May 4, 2012: Shannan Gilbert's death ruled an accidental drowning by Suffolk County medical examiner.

2016

- December 13, 2016: "Peaches" and "Jane Doe No. 3" positively identified as the same person, later identified as Tanya Jackson.

2020

- May 6, 2020: Suffolk County ordered by New York State Supreme Court to release the recording of Shannan Gilbert's 911 call.
- May 28, 2020: Police announce forensic identification of formerly unidentified remains of Valerie Mack.

2022

- 2022: Remains first found in 1996 identified as Karen Vergata.
- May 23, 2022: Recording of Shannan Gilbert's 911 call released.

2023

- July 14, 2023: Rex Heuermann charged in relation to the murders of Megan Waterman, Melissa Barthelemy, and Amber Costello and named as a suspect in the murder of Maureen Brainard-Barnes.
- August 4, 2023: Police publicly announce forensic identification of formerly unidentified remains of Karen Vergata.

2024

- January 16, 2024: Heuermann indicted for the murder of Maureen Brainard-Barnes.
- June 6, 2024: Heuermann indicted for the murders of Jessica Taylor and Sandra Costilla.
- September 16, 2024: Updated forensic sketches of "Asian Doe" released, this time both male- and female-presenting versions.
- December 17, 2024: Heuermann charged in relation to the murder of Valerie Mack.

2025

- April 23, 2025: Police publicly announce forensic identification of formerly unidentified remains of Tanya Jackson and Tatiana Dykes.
- December 5, 2025: Andrew Dykes charged in relation to the murders of Tanya Jackson and their daughter Tatiana Dykes.

2026

- April 8, 2026: Heuermann pleads guilty to the seven murders he was charged with. He also admits to the murder of Karen Vergata, for which he was not previously charged.
- June 17, 2026: Heuermann is sentenced to life in prison without parole.

== In media ==
Numerous films, television programs, podcasts, and other media have covered or referenced the case. These include:

- 48 Hours: "Long Island Serial Killer" (July 12, 2011), re-aired on September 8, 2023, with information regarding the suspect
- Disappeared: "Footprints in the Sand" (April 10, 2012), season 5, episode 14
- Killing Time (2012), a play by Tom Slot
- The Long Island Serial Killer (2013), also known as The Gilgo Beach Murders, an independent feature directed by Joseph DiPietro
- Dark Minds: "Long Island Serial Killer" (April 22, 2014), season 3, episode 5, investigative journalist, M. William Phelps and criminal profiler, John Kelly searching for clues to identify the killer on Investigation Discovery.
- Lyrics of Woz song ‘Gilgo Beach’ reference the time before the perpetrator was identified.
- Lyrics of the Panama Wedding song "Feels Like Summer" (2014) reference the events of the murders in Gilgo Beach.
- People Magazine Investigates: "The Long Island Serial Killer: The Lost Girls" (2016), season 1, episodes 1–2
- The Killing Season (2016), docuseries episode
- Crime Junkie (April 16, 2018), episode 21: "SERIAL KILLER: L.I.S.K."
- Lost Girls (2020), Netflix film based on Robert Kolker's 2013 book of the same name
- 60 Minutes Australia: "Who is the Long Island serial killer?" (2020)
- LISK: Long Island Serial Killer (2020– ), podcast from Mopac Audio
- The Long Island Serial Killer: A Mother's Hunt for Justice, Lifetime (2021), television film
- Grim Tide (2021), a five-part series on Fox Nation
- Unraveled: The Long Island Serial Killer (2021), a seven-part podcast series released by Investigation Discovery
- Dateline NBC, "The Hunt for the Gilgo Beach Killer," November 2023
- Gone Girls: The Long Island Serial Killer (2025), three-part limited documentary series on Netflix directed by Liz Garbus.
- The Gilgo Beach Killer: House of Secrets (2025), four-part documentary series on Peacock directed by Jared P. Scott and executive produced by Curtis "50 Cent" Jackson.
- "Eyewitness to Gilgo Beach" by WABC-TV's Eyewitness News (2026), a documentary series created by one of the first TV stations to cover the story, since the discovery of the bodies in 2011.

== See also ==
- Cleveland Torso Murderer
- Internet homicide
- List of serial killers in the United States
