= Cinema Arts Centre =

Movie theater in New York, United States

Coordinates: 40.8735°N 73.4143°W

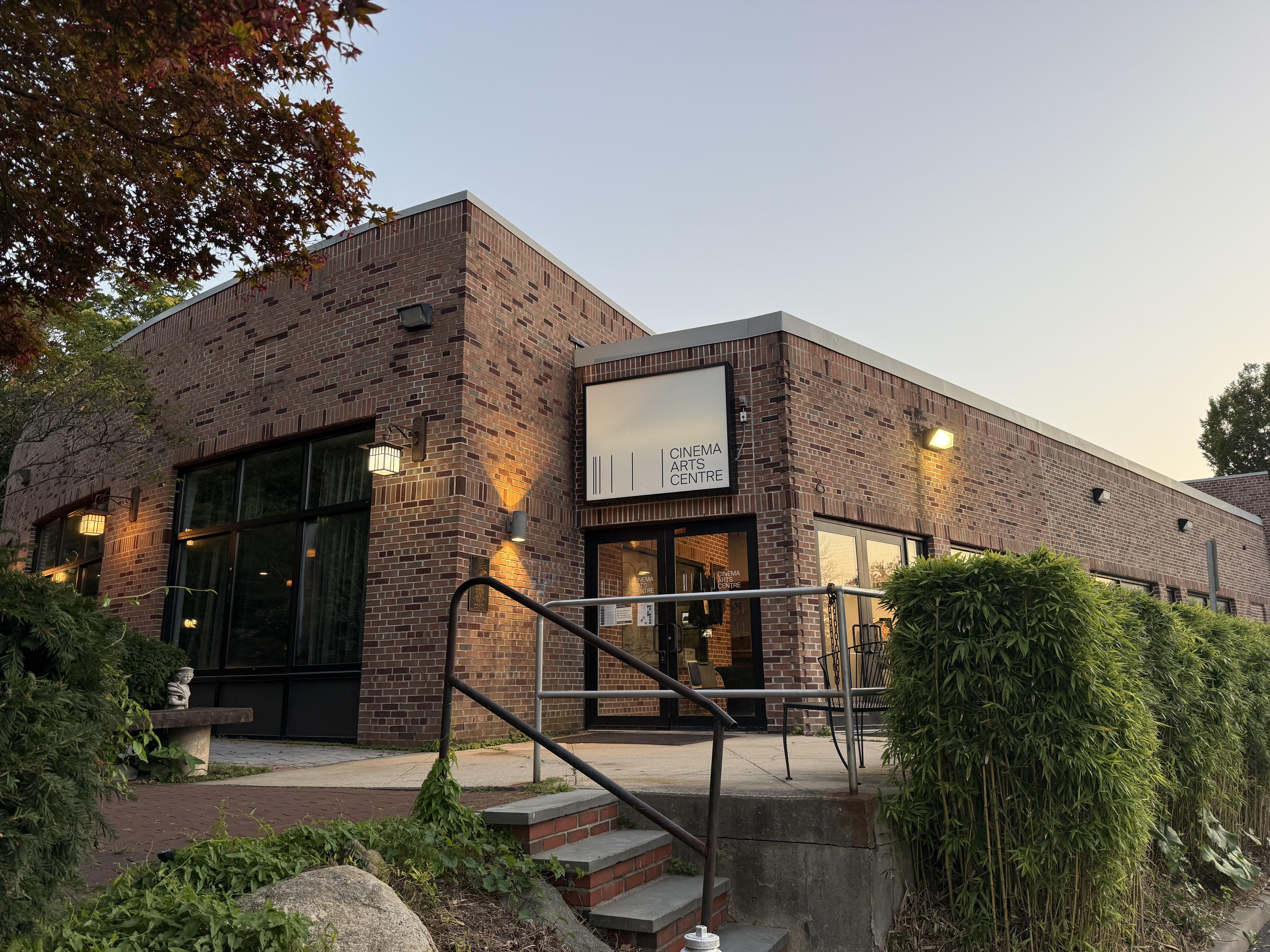
- Cinema Arts Centre Exterior

Information
- Address: 423 Park Avenue, Huntington, New York, US
- Type: Nonprofit art-house cinema
- Established: 1973
- Founders: Vic Skolnick, Charlotte Sky
- Status: Open
- Key People: Kelsie Greene, Michael Kornfeld (Executive Co-Directors)
- Membership: 10,000
- Annual attendance: 150,000
- Capacity: 416 (316 in theaters, 100 in café)
- Website: cinemaartscentre.org

Cinema Arts Centre (CAC) is a 501(c)(3) not-for-profit community cinema in Huntington, New York, United States. First opened in 1973, it is a theater supported by approximately 10,000 members. Open 365 days a year, CAC welcomes over 150,000 annual visitors and is one of the oldest continually operating art-house cinemas in America.

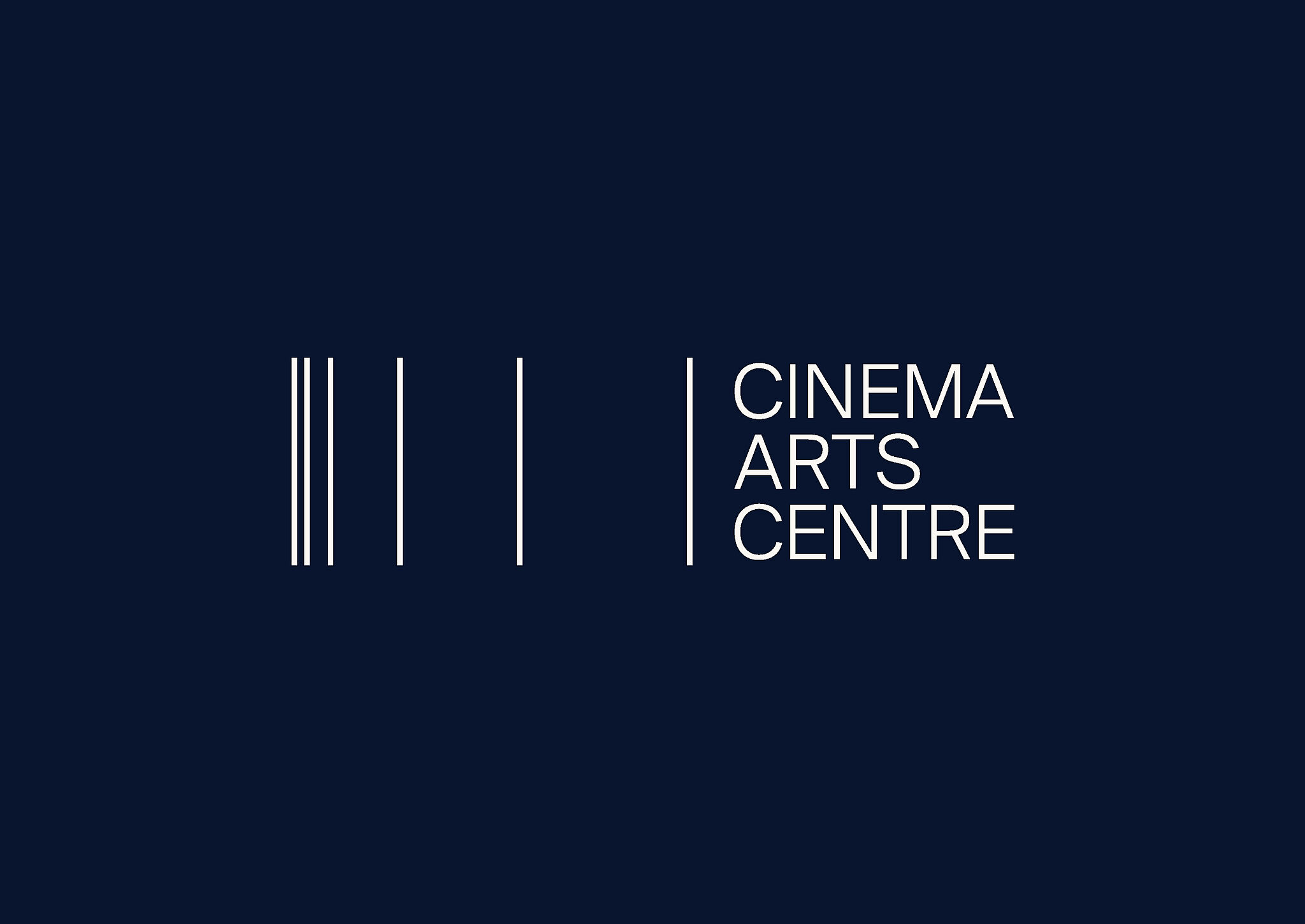
Cinema Arts Centre logo since 2022.

Map of Cinema Arts Centre

Cinema Arts Centre houses three screens, including two with 35 mm film projection capabilities. The Cinema also houses the Sky Room Café, a 2,200 square foot multi-purpose space that overlooks an outdoor sculpture garden. It serves as a community hub for patrons before and after screenings, and regularly hosts lectures, concerts, receptions, and other special events. It offers a variety of concessions, including beer, wine, and organic popcorn.

== History ==
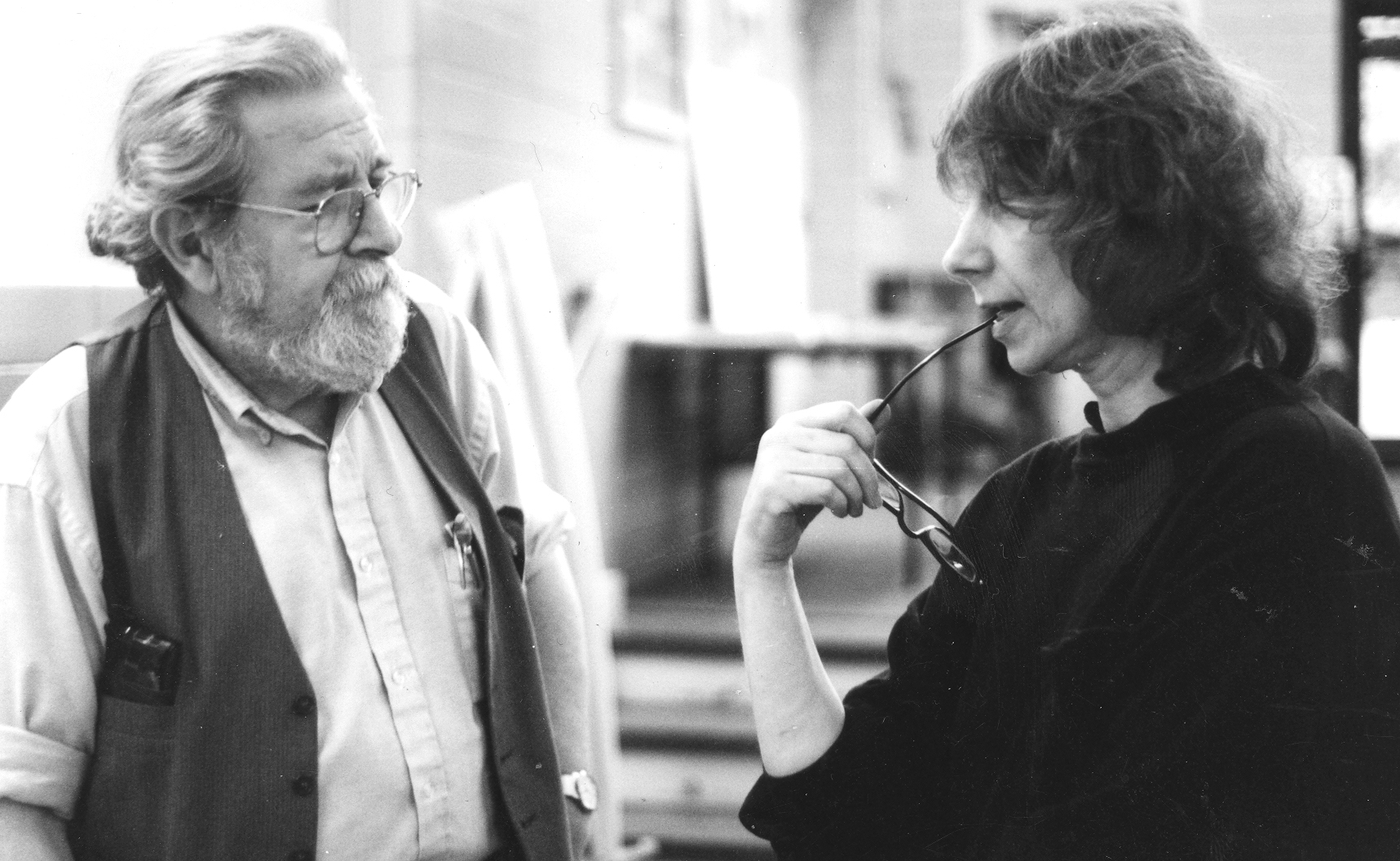
Cinema Arts Centre founders Vic Skolnick and Charlotte Sky.

Vic Skolnick and Charlotte Sky founded the cinema in 1973 after moving to Long Island and being unhappy with the film choices provided by their local multiplex. Sky rented a local dance studio on Saturday nights, where she and Skolnick projected movies onto a bed sheet. Patrons would bring their own chairs. Skolnick would give lectures before every screening. They called it New Circle Cinema, named after the dance studio they were in.

In 1974, the theater switched venues to a nearby firehouse, while also changing its name to New Community Cinema Club. Due to the theater's small-scale nature, both Skolnick and Sky kept working part-time jobs to keep it open. In 1977, the Cinema moved a third and final time to a former elementary school. In 1991, a $1 million donation from the Hoffman Foundation, a local philanthropic organization, contributed to a massive renovation and expansion of the theater. That same year, it changed its name again to Cinema Arts Centre. According to Sky, the new name looked better on paper when applying for grants.

In 2010, Vic Skolnick passed away. The Cinema held a public memorial service, which drew over six hundred people, including celebrities like Isabella Rossellini. In his place, Skolnick and Sky's son Dylan took the reins as co-director of the Cinema alongside his mother.

The Cinema temporarily closed in 2020 as a result of the COVID-19 pandemic. Cinema offered drive-in screenings and virtual programming for members stuck at home. A virtual fundraiser hosted by Elliot Gould also contributed to keeping the theater open. The Cinema reopened its doors to the public in May 2022.

In 2026, the Cinema brought on Kelsie Greene as co-director alongside Dylan.

=== 2026 Leadership Change Controversy ===
On September 1, 2026, the Cinema Arts Centre's board of directors fired Dylan Skolnick, subsequently asserting in a public statement that it had discovered what it believed was "serious misconduct," but declined to disclose further details, citing legal and privacy reasons. Michael Kornfeld, co-chair of the board, stepped down from the board and was appointed interim co-director alongside Kelsie Greene.

Skolnick's firing prompted immediate criticism from members of the local community and many industry professionals. Many of the Cinema's presenters announced that they would boycott the theater unless Skolnick was reinstated, with some members requesting refunds. Magnolia Pictures also pulled its film, Late Fame, from the Cinema in support of Skolnick.

In a September 14 interview with Newsday, Skolnick disclosed that the board had accused him of operating a competing film-booking business while employed by the Cinema Arts Centre, and of using the Cinema's time and resources in connection with that work. Skolnick acknowledged booking films for other theaters, but disputed that the work constituted serious misconduct, saying that a previous board has approved of the arrangement a decade ago. He also said that he intended to pursue legal action against the organization and called for his reinstatement and the resignation of the board.

On October 3, a crowd of about 250 people protested Skolnick's firing outside the Cinema Arts Centre. An online petition demanding the board's resignation and Skolnick's reinstatement has received over 3,000 signatures, while a GoFundMe to support his legal fees had reached over $10,000.

== Programming ==
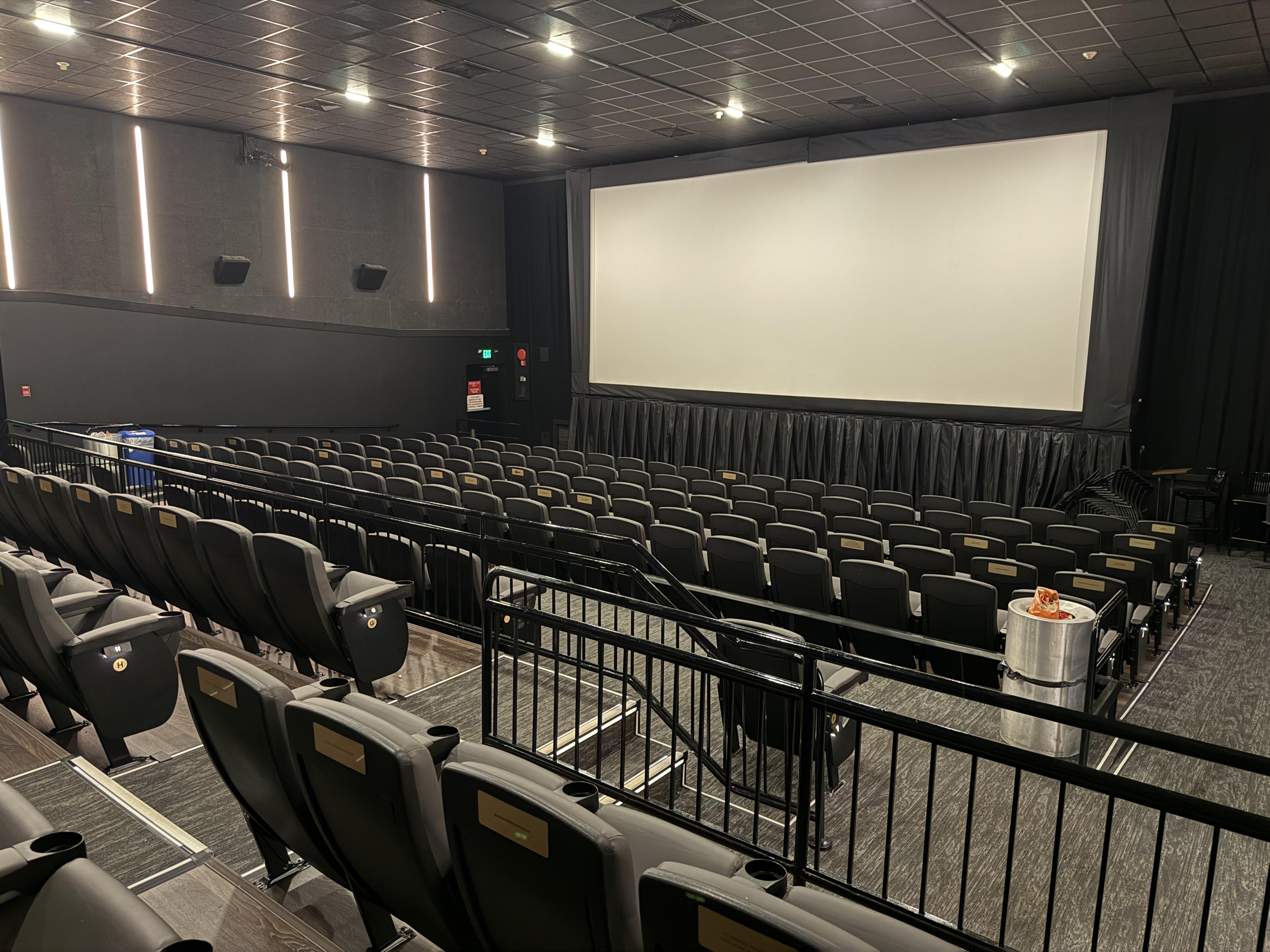
Cinema Arts Centre's main 189 seat theater in 2025.

Cinema Arts Centre presents daily screenings of first-run American and international independent films, as well as over 500 annual special events. Its educational screening program, Film Arts in Education, makes film-centered learning opportunities available to schools in Nassau and Suffolk counties. Popular programs include their monthly Sunday Schmooze, which pairs early morning screenings with a complimentary bagel brunch, and Preview Club, which allows moviegoers to watch upcoming films before their release date.

The Cinema is well-known for its repertory programming. Their Anything But Silent series features silent films with live accompaniment by musician and film historian Ben Model, while their monthly movie trivia night invites film-lovers to test their knowledge for a chance to win a $100 cash prize. Families can enjoy weekly screenings of children's films every Sunday, and horror fans can attend a yearly All-Night Horror Movie Marathon, featuring a mix of classics and new titles, with some shown on 35 mm film prints. Notable film professor Foster Hirsch also hosts a monthly film noir series.

Beyond their regular programming, the Cinema also supports local filmmakers and creatives through many different initiatives. They host the Made in Huntington Film & TV Festival, a festival launched by the Town of Huntington to support emerging local filmmakers. They also host and curate the Long Island Youth Film Festival, an annual festival that showcases films made by local filmmakers ages 25 and under. The Cinema also maintains a youth advisory board, made up of local students and young adults ages 15 to 25, who help shape select programming, organize special events, and encourage youth engagement with film and the arts.

== Reputation ==
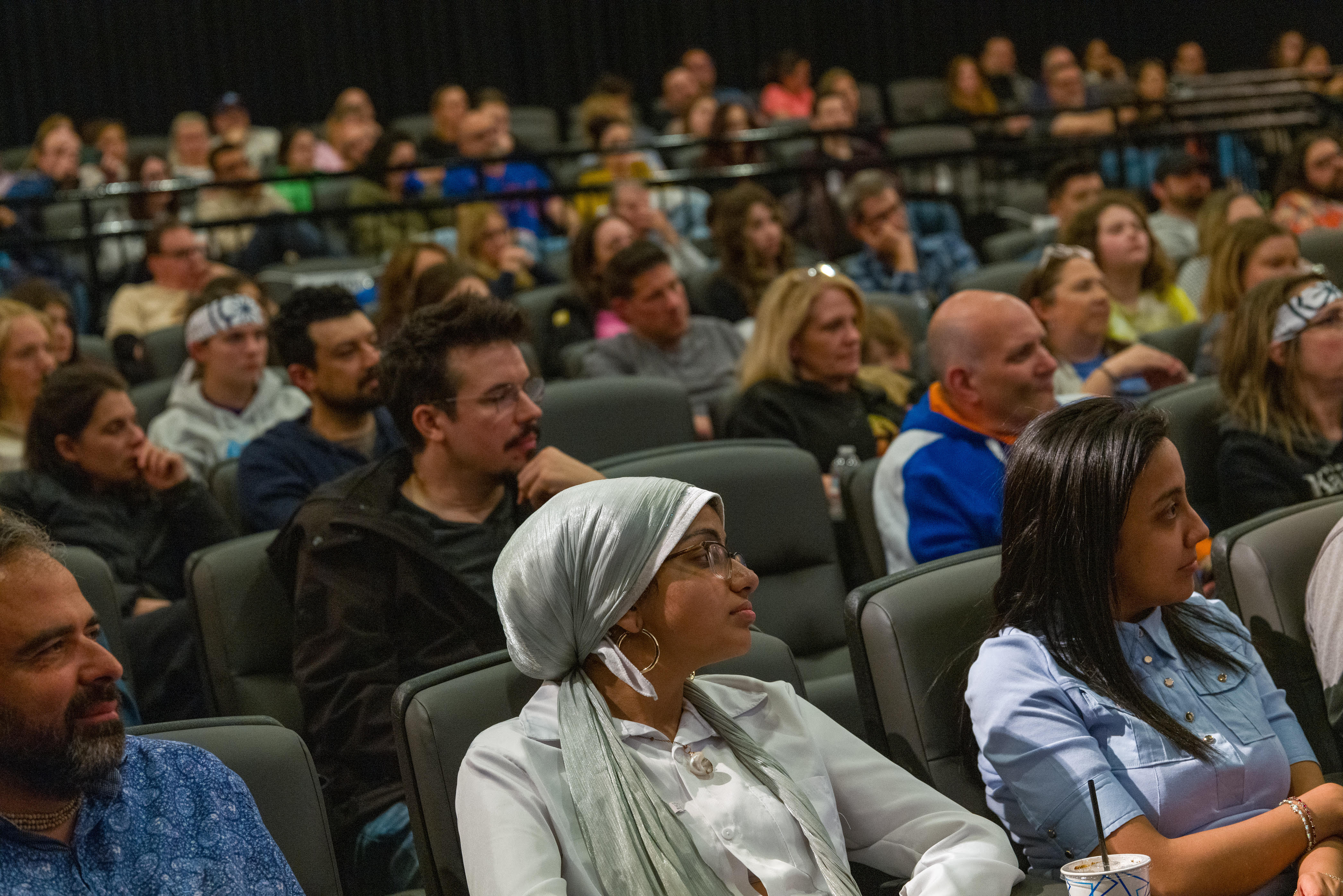
Cinema Arts Centre audience in May 2026.

Cinema Arts Centre has been described as one of Long Island's major cultural institutions. Since its founding, the Cinema has been known for platforming local talent and educating audiences through film. It has been estimated that the Cinema generates approximately $7 million in annual spending in the local economy.

In 2023, Cinema Arts Centre was inducted into the New York State Historic Business Preservation Registry after being nominated by New York State Assembly member Steve Stern. They were also presented with a $125,000 legislative grant.

Over the years, many filmmakers, actors, and cultural leaders have publicly praised Cinema Arts Centre. Actor and filmmaker Ed Burns has attributed its longevity to it being a primarily family-run business, stating, "They have that kind of love for it. And that's maybe why they're still here and so many of the other theaters are gone." Long Island native Hal Hartley has described Cinema Arts Centre as "indispensable to [his] filmmaking career" and "almost mythic." Actor Ralph Macchio has praised Cinema Arts Centre's commitment to the theatrical moviegoing experience, remarking, "It's great [to support] seeing real movies in real theaters... what they do at the Cinema Arts Centre is a dying art." Actress Isabella Rossellini has thanked the Cinema for providing “a fantastic safe harbor where we can show our work." Former US Congressman Steve Israel has sponsored political film events through the Cornell Institute of Politics and Global Affairs.

== Notable Guests ==
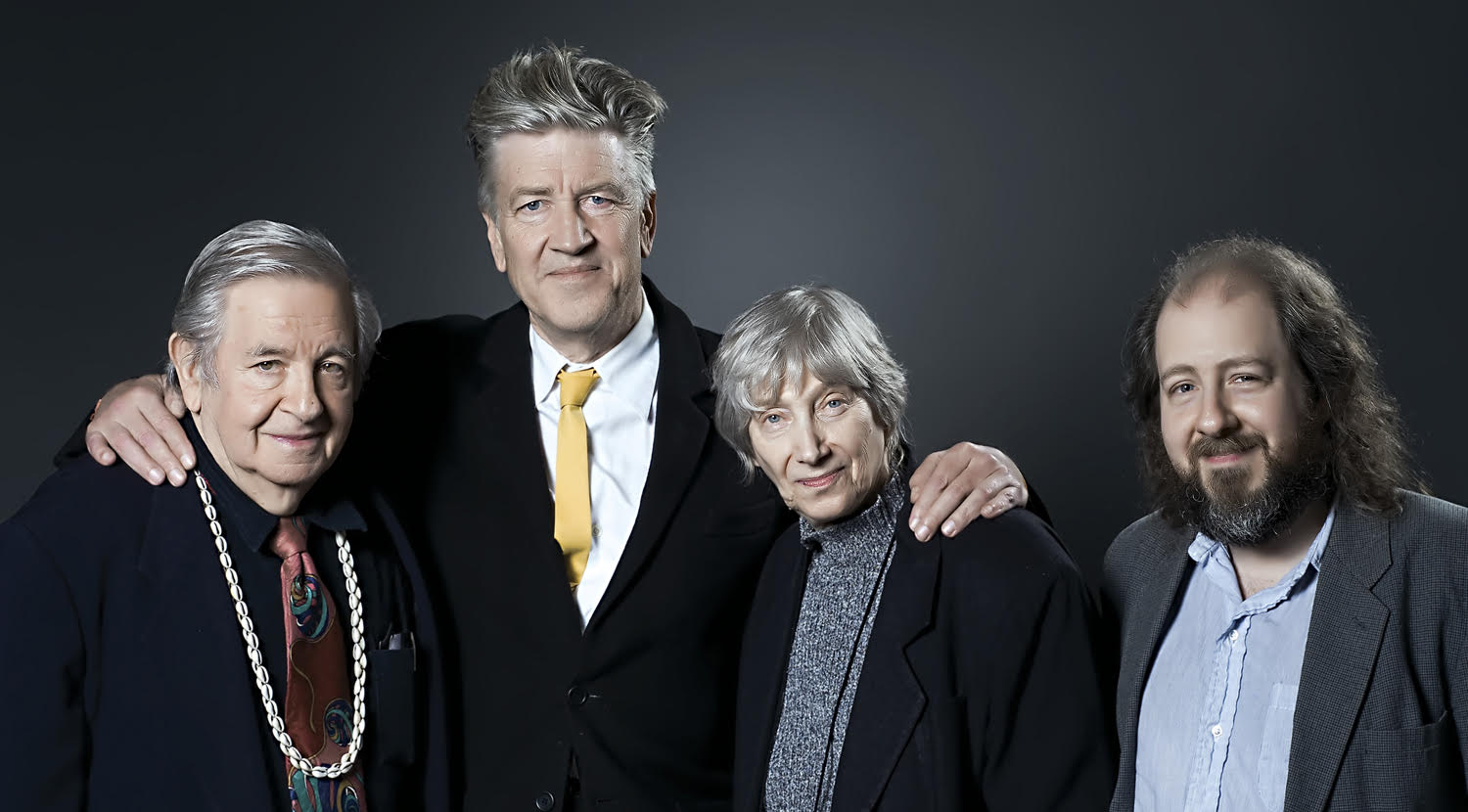
Filmmaker David Lynch with CAC founders Vic Skolnick and Charlotte Sky, and current CAC co-director Dylan Skolnick, at Cinema Arts Centre in 2008.

Cinema Arts Centre has regularly hosted filmmakers, actors, musicians, authors, and other cultural figures for screenings, discussions, and audience Q&As.

Among those who have visited are F. Murray Abraham, Alan Alda, Robert Altman, Christie Brinkley, Carol Burnett, Ed Burns, Steve Buscemi, Dick Cavett, Harry Chapin, Alan Cumming, Tony Curtis, Giancarlo Esposito, Edie Falco, Danny Glover, Debra Granik, Joel Grey, Steve Guttenberg, Hal Hartley, Tab Hunter, DJ Kool Herc, Lloyd Kaufman, Norman Lear, Fran Lebowitz, Ang Lee, Spike Lee, Patti Lupone, David Lynch, Ralph Macchio, Tim Matheson, Anne Meara, Rita Moreno, Adam Nimoy, Christopher Plummer, Bill Plympton, Paulina Porizkova, Eric Roberts, George Romero, Isabella Rossellini, Julian Schlossberg, Paul Schrader, Greg Sestero, Marc Shaiman, Tony Shalhoub, Barry Sonnenfeld, Jerry Stiller, Susan Stroman, George Takei, Colm Tóibín, John Turturro, and Bruce Vilanch.

== See also ==
- Cinemas and movie theaters in New York (state)
- Film Portal
- List of art cinemas in New York City
- List of films shot on Long Island
- List of Long Islanders
