= List of films shot on Long Island =

The following is a list of films shot fully or partially on Long Island.

Film	Year	References
3 Backyards	2010	
8mm	1999	
A New Leaf	1971	
A Perfect Murder	1998	
A Sainted Devil	1924	
Abigail	2019	
American Gangster	2007	
Annie Hall	1977	
Arthur	1981	
Bernard and Doris	2008	
Blue Vinyl	2002	
Bridge and Tunnel	2014	
Captain Valedor	2006	
Closer to Home	1995	
Compromising Positions	1985	
Cruel Intentions	1999	
Dark Was the Night	2014	
Desperate Endeavors	2012	
Eternal Sunshine of the Spotless Mind	2004	
From the Terrace	1960	
Funny Games	2007	
He Got Game	1998	
Henry's Crime	2010	
Her Indiscretion	1927	
Hitch	2005	
In & Out	1997	
Just Tell Me What You Want	1980	
Leave the World Behind	2023	
Let the Good Times Roll	1973	
L.I.E.	2001	
Lovesick	1983	
Married to the Mob	1988	
Men in Black 3	2012	
Morning Glory	2010	
Music and Lyrics	2007	
No Hard Feelings	2023	
Noah	2014	
North by Northwest	1959	
Oliver's Story	1978	
Pieces of April	2003	
Pollock	2000	
Reversal of Fortune	1990	
Rocket Gibraltar	1988	
Salt	2010	
September 12th	2005	
Side Effects	2013	
Sinister	2012	
Sisters	2015	
Solitary Man	2010	
Something Borrowed	2011	
The Age of Innocence	1993	
The Associate	1996	
The Avengers	2012	
The Bourne Legacy	2012	
The Bounty Hunter	2010	
The Brothers McMullen	1995	
The Comedian	2016	
The Curse of the Jade Scorpion	2001	
The Godfather	1972	
The Hot Rock	1972	
The Instigators	2024	
The Irishman	2019	
The Long Island Serial Killer	2013	
The Manchurian Candidate	2004	
The Out-of-Towners	1970	
The Outcasts	2017	
The Smurfs	2011	
The Swimmer	1968	
The Wolf of Wall Street	2013	
Trees Lounge	1996	
Win Win	2011	
Wolf	1994	
Young Adult	2011	
