= Oak Beach–Captree, New York =

- Former Census-designated place
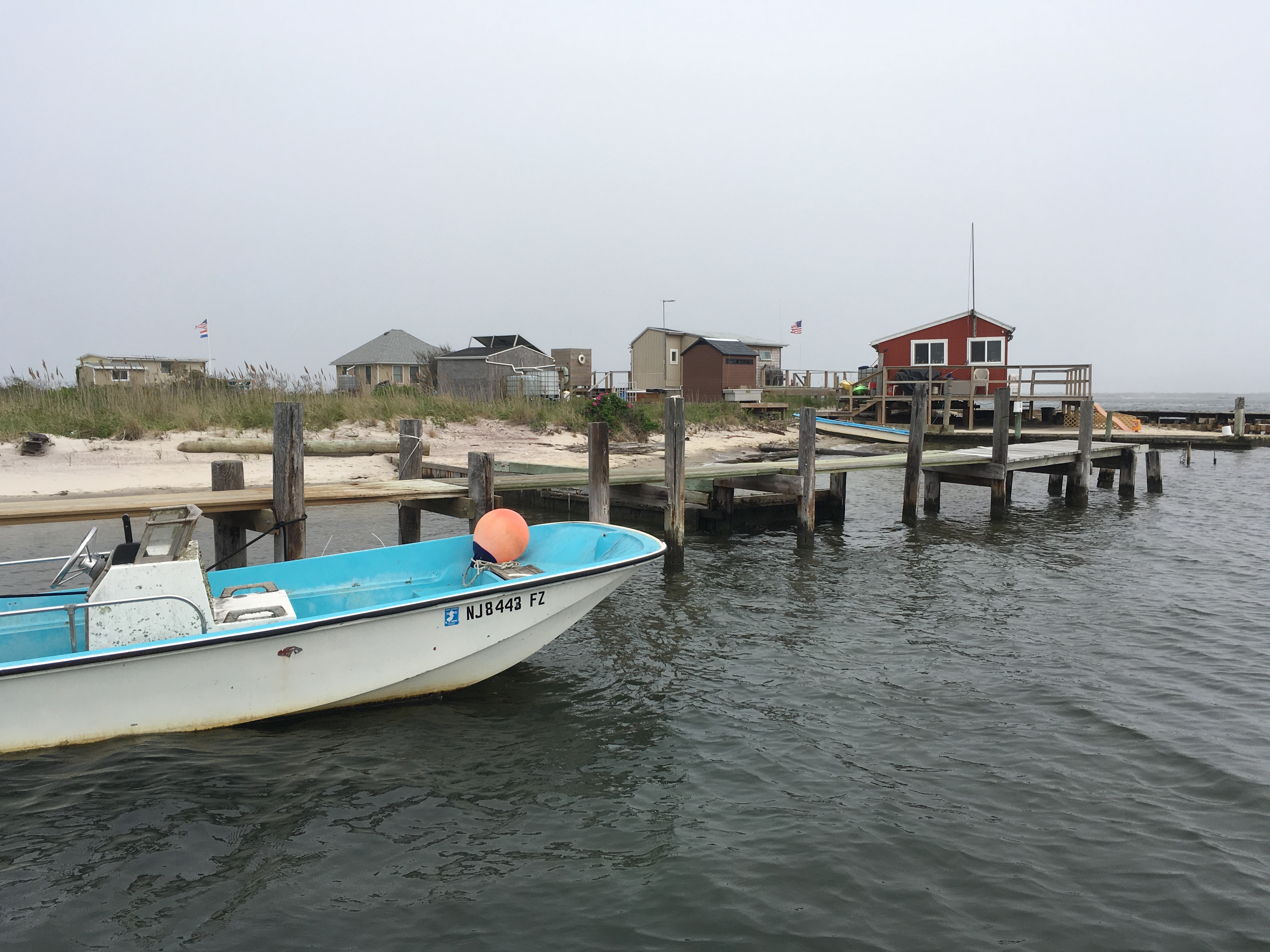
- Cottages at Captree Island

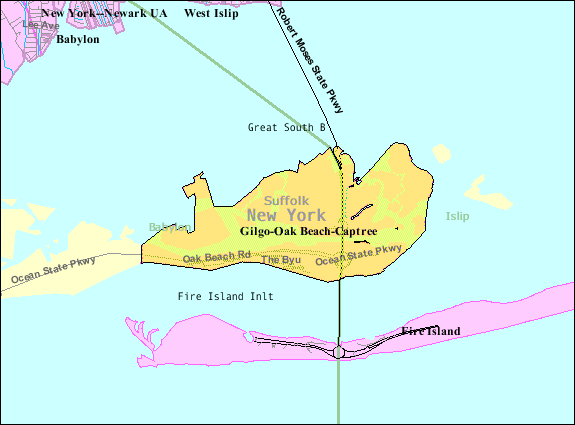
- U.S. Census map

- Location within the state of New York
- Coordinates: 40°38′21″N 73°17′35″W
- Country: United States
- State: New York
- County: Suffolk
- Towns: Babylon; Islip

Area
  - Total: 3.7 sq mi (9.5 km^{2})
  - Land: 2.7 sq mi (7.1 km^{2})
  - Water: 0.93 sq mi (2.4 km^{2})
- Elevation: 6 ft (1.8 m)

Population (2010)
  - Total: 286
  - Density: 100/sq mi (40/km^{2})
- Time zone: UTC-5 (Eastern (EST))
  - Summer (DST): UTC-4 (EDT)
- Area codes: 631, 934
- FIPS code: 36-54112

Oak Beach–Captree, frequently just called Oak Beach, was a census-designated place (CDP) in the towns of Babylon and Islip in Suffolk County, New York, United States. The population was 286 at the time of the 2010 census.

It was split into the Oak Beach and Captree CDPs for the 2020 census.

== History ==
Prior to the 2010 census, the area was part of a larger CDP called Gilgo-Oak Beach-Captree, New York. The Oak Beach–Captree CDP was created for the 2010 census and consisted of some small beach communities on a barrier island along the southern edge of Long Island – including Oak Beach, Oak Island, and Captree Island.

For the 2020 census, Oak Beach–Captree was split into two separate CDPs, called Oak Beach and Captree.

== Geography ==
According to the United States Census Bureau, the CDP had a total area of 3.7 square miles (9.5 km^{2}), of which 2.7 square miles (7.1 km^{2}) was land and 0.93 square miles (2.4 km^{2}), or 25.03%, was water.

== Demographics ==
The census numbers are presumably for full-time inhabitants; many of these houses are second homes and not primary residences, although the proportion of seasonal residents is decreasing.

The land for these communities is not privately owned, but leased from the Town of Babylon through the year 2065. However, the residences on the property are owned. If the leases are not renewed at some point in the future, the owners will have to move the houses elsewhere, similar to what happened at High Hill Beach when Jones Beach State Park was created.

== See also ==
- Gilgo-Oak Beach-Captree, New York
- Setauket-East Setauket, New York
