= Janetka v. Dabe =

American legal case

- Court: United States Court of Appeals for the Second Circuit
- Full case name: Janetka v. Dabe
- Argued: November 2, 1989
- Decided: December 15, 1989
- Citations: 892 F.2d 187; 29 Fed. R. Evid. Serv. 612

Court membership
- Judges sitting: Roger Miner, John Daniel Mahoney, Gregory W. Carman (Ct. Int. Trade)

Case opinions
- Majority: Miner, joined by a unanimous court

In Janetka v. Dabe, 892 F.2d 187 (2d Cir. 1989), the Second Circuit considered whether, under New York law, a plaintiff could satisfy the element of "favorable termination" requisite to a malicious prosecution claim when he had been acquitted on a misdemeanor charge (resisting arrest) but convicted of a less serious charge (disorderly conduct, a violation).

== Background ==
In 1986, Andrew F. Janetka, Jr. was arrested by Darrell Dabe of the Suffolk County Police Department for resisting arrest. Janetka was found guilty of a lesser charge, disorderly conduct, and Dabe was reprimanded for how he documented the incident. Janetka later filed suit against the county under the concept of respondeat superior. The court reiterated that, under New York law,

- A "favorable termination" is a termination indicating that the accused is not guilty.
- When the termination is indecisive, the surrounding facts must be examined to determine "whether the failure to proceed implies a lack of reasonable grounds for the prosecution."

== Holding ==
The court held that this acquittal constituted "favorable termination".

=== Reasoning ===
1) the multiple criminal charges were "distinct," i.e.

(a) their elements are distinct,
(b) neither is a lesser included offense of the other, and
(c) (most importantly) the underlying acts were committed against different people (the disorderly conduct charge involved Janetka's actions directed at the unidentified Hispanic man; the resisting arrest charge involved his actions directed at the officers' attempts to arrest him).

2) to reject a malicious prosecution claim would be "particularly inappropriate" where the acquitted charge was the more serious one, because then police officers could add unsupported, serious charges to legitimate, minor ones with impunity.

== Analysis ==
The holding of Janetka is overcome by arguing that all the charges for which plaintiff was prosecuted stem from the same criminal activity and substantially overlap.
