= Oak Beach, New York =

Census-designated place on Jones Beach Island

Coordinates: 40°38′21″N 73°17′18″W

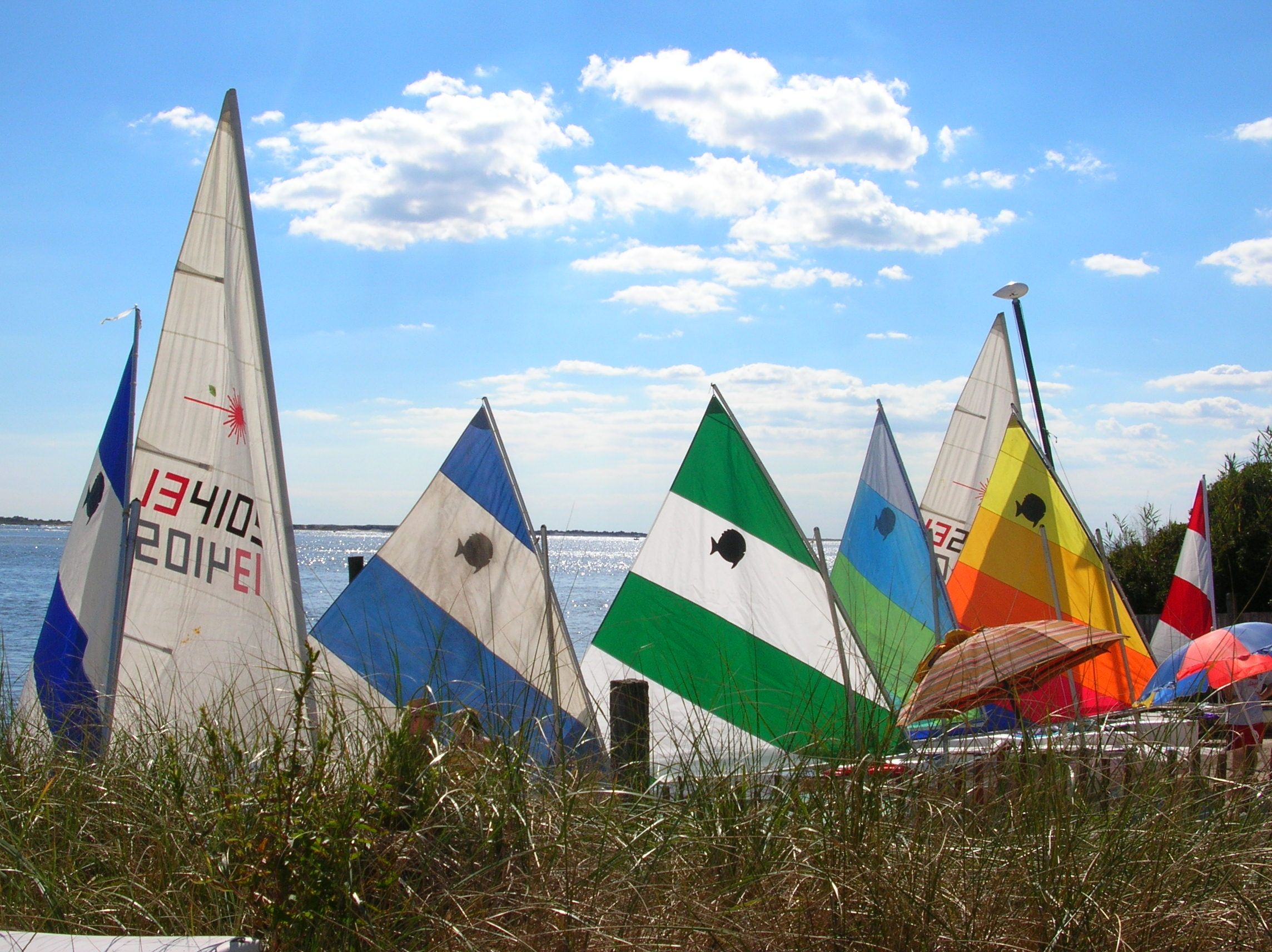
Sails on the community beach at Oak Beach

Oak Beach is a small community and census-designated place located near the eastern end of Jones Beach Island, a barrier island between the Atlantic Ocean and the Great South Bay of Long Island. The community is part of the village of Babylon in Suffolk County, New York, United States. As of the 2020 census, Oak Beach had a population of 268. The eastern part, the Oak Island Beach Association, is gated, whereas the western part is not. The Oak Beach CDP was first listed prior to the 2020 census. Prior to that the community was part of the Oak Beach–Captree census-designated place.

== History and amenities ==
Oak Beach has been inhabited since at least the first decade of the twentieth century, when a U.S. Coast Guard lifesaving station was located there, although it could not be reached overland at that time. Prior to that, marsh bird hunters had kept shacks in the area. Ferry access from Babylon enabled cottages to be built and made more accessible by car after construction of Ocean Parkway; it was largely a summer community until the completion of the Robert Moses Causeway in 1951, which allowed much faster travel from the main part of Long Island. It has gradually evolved since then to become a location where most residents live year-round.

== Geography ==
Oak Beach is in southwestern Suffolk County, in the southeast part of the village of Babylon. The census-designated place includes the community of Oak Beach on Jones Beach Island, as well as the community of Oak Island, directly to the north. The CDP is bordered to the east by Captree State Park and to the west by Gilgo State Park. To the south is the west end of Fire Island.

== Ownership ==
The land is not owned by the residents but is on long-term lease from the Village of Babylon. In the early 1990s, New York State litigated against extension of the lease. After much negotiation, including detailed environmental impact statements, the lease was renewed (currently through 2050), although with a ramp up in costs. In 2012, the Village of Babylon agreed to extend the current leases through 2065.

== Shannan Gilbert ==
On May 1, 2010, Shannan Gilbert, an aspiring actress from Jersey City, N.J., who worked as an escort, disappeared after a job in Oak Beach’s gated community. While searching for Gilbert, the police found the remains of 10 bodies miles away near Gilgo Beach—some in December 2010 and others in April 2011—and approximately nine miles from where Gilbert's body was eventually discovered. Authorities believe Gilbert got lost within the marsh land and died from either exposure or accidental drowning.

On November 29, 2011, the police announced their belief that one person is responsible for all 10 deaths (whom the press refers to at various times as: "the Long Island serial killer", "LISK", "the Gilgo Beach Killer", or "the Craigslist Ripper"), and that they did not believe the case of Gilbert, who went missing before the first set of bodies was found, was related. "It is clear that the area in and around Gilgo Beach has been used to discard human remains for some period of time," said Suffolk County District Attorney Thomas Spota.

On December 10, 2015, Suffolk County Police announced that the FBI had officially joined the investigation. A spokesperson for the FBI confirmed the announcement. The FBI had previously assisted in the search for victims, but was never officially part of the investigation until this announcement. A crucial break in this case came in January 2023, and in July 2023 police arrested Rex Heuermann, a Manhattan architect—whose clients included Catholic Charities, American Airlines, and other tenants at John F. Kennedy, Jr. International Airport—who resided in Massapequa Park. In 2026, Heuermann pleaded guilty to the killing of seven women and confessed to an eighth murder for which he had not been charged; however, Shannan Gilbert was not among these victims.

The Gilbert Family’s attorney stated that Shannan Gilbert will be remembered as the woman who by her death exposed this killer and the truth.

== Education ==
It is in the Babylon Union Free School District.
