= The Long Island Serial Killer =

- Film poster
- Directed by: Joseph DiPietro
- Written by: Joseph DiPietro; Michael Eimicke
- Produced by: Joseph DiPietro; Adam Ginsberg; Howard Simon
- Starring: Jennifer Polanksy; Adam Ginsberg; Dewey Wynn; Renne Kay; Ryan Kaiser; Lindsay DeLuca; Matthew Smolko; Josephine Pizzino; Stav Livne; Joe Mankowski; Guy Balotine
- Cinematography: J. Poisson
- Edited by: Dave Campfield; Joseph DiPietro
- Production companies: LISKmovie; TwitchTwitch Productions
- Distributed by: WildEye Releasing
- Release date: November 12, 2013
- Running time: 81 minutes
- Country: United States
- Language: English

The Long Island Serial Killer (also known as The Gilgo Beach Murders) is a 2013 American true crime horror film loosely based on the victims of the unidentified Long Island serial killer. He is believed to have murdered ten to seventeen women on Long Island between 1996 and 2010. The film is written by Joseph DiPietro and Michael Eimicke, and directed by DiPietro.

== Plot ==
A serial killer is at large in New York, murdering prostitutes and disposing their bodies on the beaches of Long Island. A virtuous college student turns to escorting for noble reasons, unknowingly putting herself directly in his path.

== Cast ==
- Jennifer Polansky as Tina Everett
- Adam Ginsberg as The Killer
- Dewey Wynn as Mark
- Renee Kay as Sheryl Graham
- Ryan Kaiser as Jimmy
- Lindsay DeLuca as Elizabeth Stark
- Matthew Smolko as Rick
- Josephine Pizzino as Jane Everett
- Stav Livne as Sarah Coleman
- Joe Mankowski as Benjamin Harvey
- Guy Balotine as Jude
- Chrissy Laboy as Michelle Coleman
- Sara Antkowiak as Colette
- Patrick Devaney as Detective Kaplan
- Jeffrey Alan Solomon as Tyler

== Production ==
The film was shot over the course of ten consecutive days, primarily in Nassau County and Manhattan, with additional scenes shot in Suffolk County, the boroughs of Queens and Brooklyn, as well as the city of Yonkers, and parts of Fairfield County, Connecticut. The film was scored using archival Production music from the KPM music library. DiPietro said the movie is "a work of fiction inspired by actual events". He did not want to make a documentary, and he explores "the lost girls" rather than focus on the killer.

== Reception ==
The film premiered at Anthology Film Archives in New York City on November 12, 2013. The Huffington Post described the independent feature as a "compelling thriller about unsolved murder, the underside of the Internet, and the compulsive nature of guarding secrets."
