= Suffolk County Police Department =

Police agency in New York state

Coordinates: 40.82078°N 72.91818°W

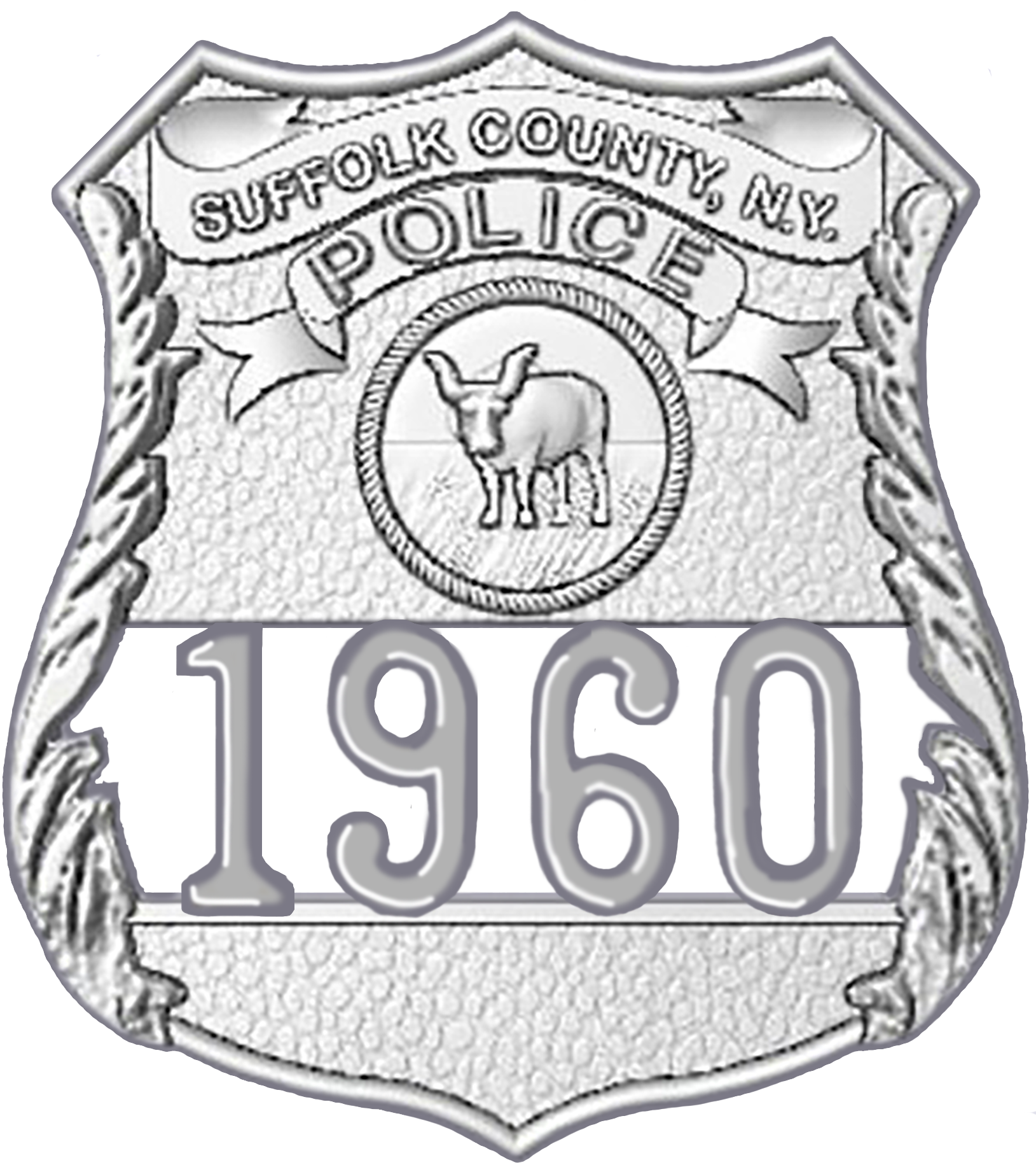
- Common name: Suffolk County Police
- Abbreviation: SCPD

Agency overview
- Formed: 1960

Jurisdictional structure
- Operations jurisdiction: Suffolk County, New York, United States
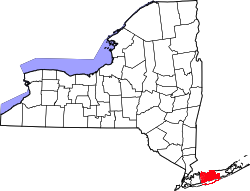
- Map of Suffolk County Police Department's jurisdiction
- Area: 911 square miles (2,400 km^{2})
- Population: 1.5 Million
- Legal jurisdiction: Suffolk County, New York
- General nature: Local civilian police

Operational structure
- Headquarters: Yaphank, New York
- Police Officers: 2,349 Police Officers
- Civilian Members: 900 Civilian Members
- Agency executive: Kevin Catalina, Police Commissioner
- Units: List: Emergency Services Unit; Aviation; Marine; Arson; Highway Patrol; Airport Operations Section; Community Oriented Police Enforcement; Auxiliary Police

Facilities
- Precincts: 7 Precincts List: 1st Precinct - Town of Babylon, including the incorporated villages of Lindenhurst and Babylon. 2nd Precinct - Town of Huntington. 3rd Precinct - Town of Islip (West), including the incorporated village of Brightwaters. 4th Precinct - Town of Smithtown and the incorporated villages of the Branch, Islandia, and Lake Grove, and certain border areas of the Towns of Huntington, Islip and Brookhaven. 5th Precinct - Towns of Brookhaven (South) and Islip (East) and the incorporated villages of Patchogue and Bellport. 6th Precinct - Town of Brookhaven (North) and the incorporated villages of Old Field, Poquott, Belle Terre, Shoreham and Port Jefferson. 7th Precinct - Town of Brookhaven (east).
- Helicopters: 4

Website
- Official Site

The Suffolk County Police Department (SCPD) provides police services to 5 of the 10 Towns in Suffolk County, New York. It is the second largest county police agency in the United States, with approximately 2500 sworn officers.

== History ==
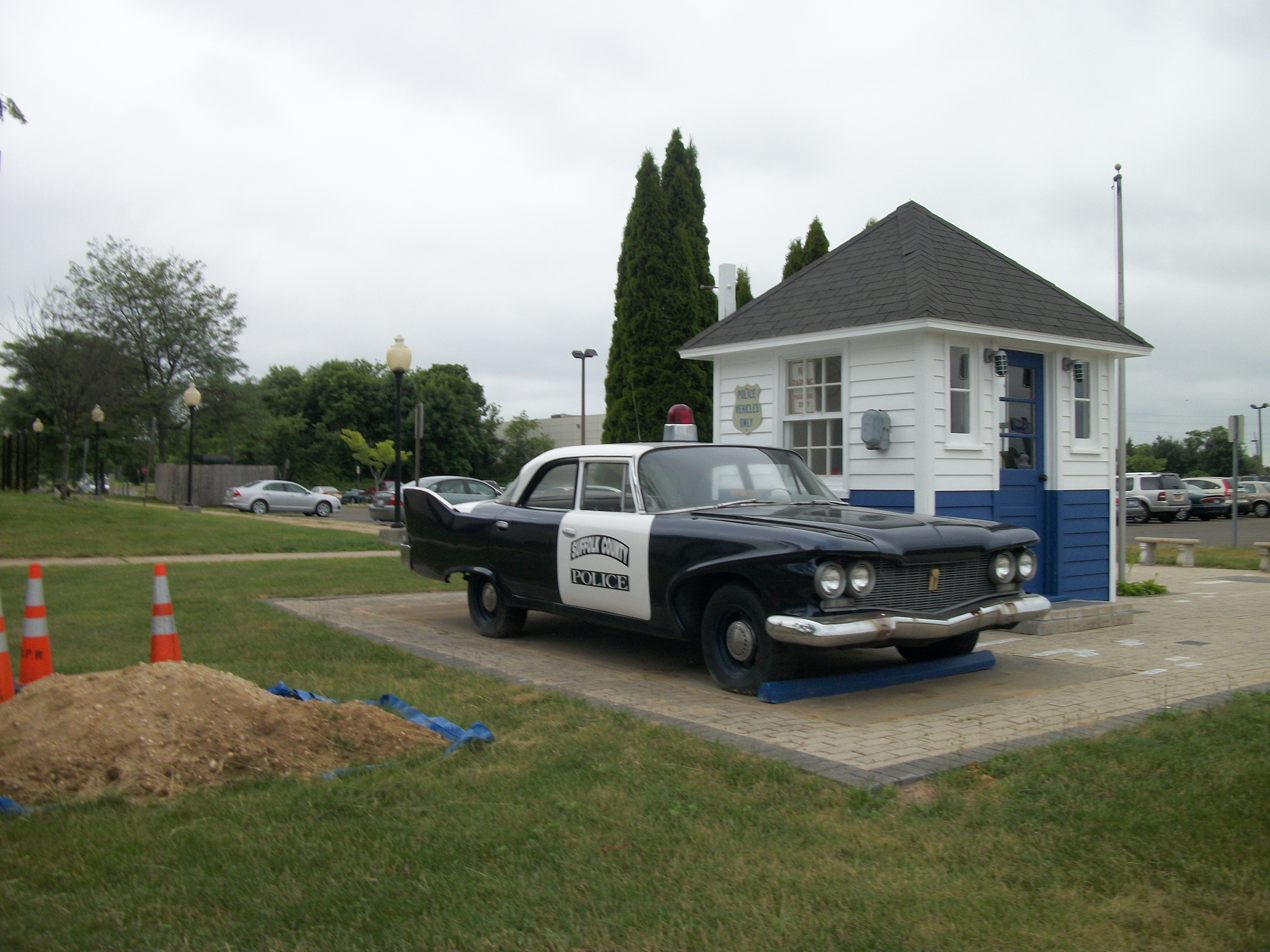
A 1960 Plymouth Suffolk County Police car at the Police Headquarters and Museum in Yaphank, New York. SCPD painted their cars this way from 1960 to 1972.

Prior to 1960, law enforcement in Suffolk County was the responsibility of local towns and villages as well as the New York State Police. From the 17th century until well into the 20th century, many of these jurisdictions employed only part-time constables, who were usually appointed by local communities and paid to enforce court orders. Additional fees were paid for making arrests, serving warrants and transporting prisoners. Few of these constables had any formal law enforcement training, hours were often long and pay was low.

The New York State Police arrived on Long Island in 1917, and many towns and villages began forming their own small police forces soon thereafter. Following World War II, there was a push to unite the 33 separate law enforcement agencies then operating within Suffolk County.

Following the passage, in 1958, of state legislation creating the county executive form of government, a referendum was held on the creation of a county police force. The five western towns—Babylon, Huntington, Islip, Smithtown and Brookhaven—voted in favor. The five eastern towns—Riverhead, Southold, Shelter Island, East Hampton, and Southampton—opted to retain their own police forces, and do so to this day, with the Suffolk County Police Department providing support and specialized services.

The towns that voted in favor thus agreed to turn over all their police functions to the new agency. In addition to traditional uniformed patrol services, the new agency agreed to provide: a Detective Bureau, a Communications Bureau, an Identification Bureau, a Central Records Bureau, and a police academy for training new officers.

All incumbent town and village police officers serving in those areas that voted to join the police district became members of the new department without further examination or qualification. In addition, state troopers serving on Long Island who so desired could request appointment to the new force. Criminal investigators in the district attorney's office were appointed the new detectives. The serving town and village police chiefs were typically appointed inspectors, deputy chiefs or assistant chiefs in the new department. The remaining positions were filled by competitive civil service examinations. The Suffolk County Police Department officially came into being on January 1, 1960, with 619 sworn members.

In recent years, Suffolk officers (along with the Nassau County Police Department) have become well known in the New York area for their rate of pay, especially as compared with the nearby New York City Police Department. In 2010, starting pay for a Suffolk patrol officer was approximately $59,000 annually. After five years of service, pay rose to $108,608, not including overtime, night differential and benefits. In 2019, starting pay was reduced to $41,000, but rose to $155,693 after 11.5 years. By 2021, nearly half of the Suffolk County Police Department earned more than $200,000.

In 2011, the Suffolk County Police Department union formed a Super PAC called the Long Island Law Enforcement Foundation. It spent hundreds of thousands of dollars in local elections each following year.

In April 2016, county police officer Christopher McCoy pressured a female prisoner to have sex with him in an interrogation room. He was convicted in 2019 and sentenced to a year in confinement.

=== History of sex and race discrimination ===
The US Justice Department sued Suffolk in 1983 for discriminating against women and people with minority racial identities in police hiring. The county signed a consent decree three years later committing itself to increased minority hiring while denying any intentional discrimination.

The number of officers with minority racial identities has remained small. A well-publicized cheating scandal on the 1996 police exam further undermined confidence in the fairness of the hiring process. A program aimed at increasing the number of Black and Hispanic cadets was struck down in 1997 as unconstitutional.

In 2003, six female officers sued the department for sex discrimination over its pregnancy policy and won a judgment from the federal Equal Employment Opportunity Commission (EEOC). In 2006, a federal jury found that the Suffolk County Police Department had discriminated against female officers by denying them access to limited duty positions, for example, working the precinct desk, during their pregnancies.

In 2006 Police Commissioner Richard Dormer announced that highway patrol and certain other units would undertake a pilot program whereby officers would record the race and/or ethnicity of drivers stopped for traffic violations. The purpose of the program, according to the commissioner, was to demonstrate that the department was not engaging in "racial profiling." While Dormer denied any racial profiling by the department, he refused to disclose the results of the program.

In February 2021, WSHU reported that 90% of county police officers with the rank of "detective" or above were White. The county has a population that is about 80% White. It was reported that White candidates had been given examination answers before their promotion tests. An officer from outside the department was brought in to review the process.

=== Wrongful conviction of Marty Tankleff ===
Suffolk County Police and their interrogation methods came under scrutiny due to the handling of the 1988 murder case of Seymour and Arlene Tankleff. The Tankleffs' only son, Martin Tankleff, was wrongfully convicted of the crime after police coerced a confession using deception. Lead Detective Kevin James (Jim) McCready used a ruse in which he claimed that Seymour Tankleff had regained consciousness and had indicated that his son Martin was responsible for the crime. Tankleff was tried, found guilty, and sentenced to 50 years to life for the murder of his parents. After serving more than 17 years of imprisonment, his conviction was vacated and he was released from prison in 2007. In 2017 Tankleff sued Suffolk County, in addition to individuals who were police officers and county employees at the time of his arrest and trial. Tankleff was represented by Barry Scheck of Innocence Project in Manhattan. In 2018, Tankleff reached a settlement with Suffolk County for $10 million.

=== False arrest of reporter ===
In July 2011, a news reporter, Philip Datz, was arrested by an officer of the Suffolk County Police Department and charged with 'obstruction of governmental administration'. According to the raw footage posted on YouTube, the credentialed cameraman had been recording the aftermath of a police chase from the opposite side of the street while in a public area when he was approached by the officer and told to "go away" without revealing any cause or reason. After departing and calling the department's Public Information Office, the videographer relocated a block away and began recording again. The officer pulled up in his cruiser and then arrested the videographer. Charges were later dropped, with the department's claim that officers would undergo 'retraining', but no other assertions have been made or promised. When the story was widely shared, many members of the public used the department's Facebook page to air their grievances, only to have their comments deleted and the page later closed to any new comments. The Police Department's Internal Affairs Bureau subsequently found that the officer made a false arrest and violated department rules and procedures.

In a settlement approved in 2014 by the Suffolk County Legislature, the Suffolk County Police Department agreed to annually train and test all police officers on the First Amendment right of the public and the media to observe, photograph and record police activity in public locations. The settlement also requires the SCPD to pay Datz $200,000 and create a Police-Media Relations Committee to address problems between the press and the Police Department. After public outcry over Datz's arrest, the SCPD also revised its rules and procedures to instruct officers that "members of the media cannot be restricted from entering and/or producing recorded media from areas that are open to the public, regardless of subject matter."

=== Criminal conviction of former Suffolk County Police Chief James Burke ===
In November 2016, former Suffolk County Police Chief James Burke was sentenced to 46 months in federal custody. He was convicted of assaulting a man in 2012 during an interrogation and obstructing a federal investigation.

Burke violently assaulted a man in custody who had stolen a duffel bag from Burke's police vehicle. The duffel bag contained sex toys, a pornographic DVD and Viagra. Burke pleaded guilty in February 2016 to charges of a civil rights violation and conspiracy to obstruct justice. Thomas Spota, the then-district attorney in Suffolk County, was convicted in December 2019 of conspiracy to cover up Burke's violent assault. Christopher McPartland, who had been Suffolk County's top anti-corruption prosecutor, was also convicted in the conspiracy.

In December 2016, an attorney for the family of Shannan Gilbert, who disappeared and was found dead in Oak Beach, reported that an escort had stated that she suspected that Burke might be connected to the Long Island serial killer cases. The escort, who identified herself as "Leanne," stated that at one party she had attended in April 2011 in Oak Beach she had seen Burke drag a woman of Asian appearance by the hair to the ground. Leanne said that when she saw Burke at a later party in August 2011, she decided to engage in sexual activity with him. She described an experience in which Burke violently yanked her head during oral sex to the point where she began to tear up. Burke was unable to reach orgasm and proceeded to throw $300–400 at her afterwards. At the time she was not a professional sex worker and she states that this was the first time she was paid for sex.

Rex Heuermann was charged as a main suspect in the Gilgo Beach killer case in 2023. Burke was reported to have blocked an FBI probe of the Long Island serial killer case during his time as police chief.

=== Mafia brothels ===
In October of 2024, 18-year Officer George Trimigliozzi was arrested as part of an organized crime syndicate running several brothels.

== Size and organization ==
Today, the department has a strength of around 2,500 sworn officers, making it one of the largest police agencies in the country. In addition to officers, the department also employs 500 civilian members, as well as nearly 400 school crossing guards. In 2006, the department announced it would be staffing its public information unit entirely with civilians, thus freeing more officers to return to patrol duty. In October, 2021, Suffolk County announced plans to hire 462 new SCPD officers.

The department is headed by a civilian police commissioner, appointed by the county executive, and police headquarters are located in Yaphank. On April 9, 2018, Geraldine Hart was sworn in as the first female commissioner. She resigned in 2021, and Stuart Cameron was appointed Acting Commissioner.

The department has a total of seven precincts. Four of the five towns are served by their own precinct, with odd-numbered precincts covering the south shore towns and even-numbered ones covering the north shore. The exception is the town of Brookhaven, whose sheer size (sprawling from Long Island Sound to the Atlantic Ocean) necessitated the establishment of two precincts, the 5th in Patchogue and the 6th in Selden (formerly Coram). Due to population growth in the eastern part of Brookhaven, and deployment problems from the existing station houses caused by Long Island's perpetually traffic-choked roads and highways, another precinct (the 7th) was established in Shirley in the late 1990s.

=== Park Police ===
Park Police Officer patch

The Suffolk County Park Police was formerly a distinct law enforcement agency. The department was responsible for policing the largest local government park system in the United States - 46,000 acres (190 km^{2}) of parkland. The department covered 14 major parks, four golf courses, four marinas, seven camping facilities, more than 200 historic structures, two equestrian centers, four lifeguard protected beaches with 15 miles (24 km) of ocean front, picnic facilities for 20,000 people, and more than 600 miles (970 km) of nature trails. On October 7, 2014, the Suffolk County Park Police was absorbed into the Suffolk County Police Department. All personnel from the Parks Police are now employed with the County Police.

== Recruitment ==
The Suffolk County Police Department (SCPD) administers applications for Police Officer positions utilizing the Suffolk County Civil Service system. Candidates interested in employment must pass the written civil service exam in order to begin the selection process.

=== Police Departments of Towns & Villages within Suffolk ===
The Suffolk County Police Department (SCPD) also serves as the recruitment and appointing authority for law enforcement positions in certain towns and villages within Suffolk County that have their own independent police forces, which include, but are not limited to:

1. Asharoken
2. Amityville
3. Brookhaven
4. East Hampton
5. Head of the Harbor
6. Lloyd Harbor
7. Nissequogue
8. Northport
9. Ocean Beach
10. Quogue
11. Riverhead
12. Sag Harbor
13. Saltaire
14. Shelter Island
15. Southampton
16. Southold
17. Westhampton
18. Westhampton Beach

Candidates must be applicants for the Suffolk County Police Department in order to be considered. Typically, positions are first offered to those who are residents of the town that is hiring. If there are more positions to be filled than resident applicants, non-residents will then be considered. (Though some towns and villages require applicants to become residents upon being hired.) Those who are selected train at the Suffolk County Police Academy in the same recruit class with SCPD and other Suffolk County town and village agencies. (Though some jurisdictions exempt from academy training applicants with prior service as police officers elsewhere in New York State.)

== Famous cases ==
The Suffolk County Police have investigated several well-known and notorious crimes and incidents, including the Amityville Horror murder case; the 1987 case of Richard Angelo, the so-called "Angel of Death;" the 1993 Katie Beers kidnapping; the 1994 "Suffolk County Sniper" case and the Ted Ammon murder case. Suffolk ESU, K-9, Crime Scene and Aviation officers also participated in the recovery effort at the World Trade Center site in September 2001.

=== Long Island serial killer ===
Between December 2010 and April 2011, eight bodies, four wrapped in burlap sacks, were found dumped on Jones Beach Island near Gilgo Beach, and two more were found in neighbouring Nassau County. The remains were located near Ocean Parkway. Several of the victims who have been identified were sex workers who advertised on Craigslist. One of the victims was reported missing in 2007. Police suspect a serial killer may be responsible for all ten murders. In an interview with Newsday, Robert Creighton, a former Suffolk County Police commissioner, said, "I have no recollection of anything as complex as this or as large as this." Creighton also said the nearest comparison to the case was the Ronald DeFeo murders. He said, "The difference was, that was all in one place and all at one time." As of July, 2023, a Manhattan architect named Rex Heuermann has been in custody suspected of at least 6 of the Gilgo Beach killings, as well as, at least 1 unrelated murder from the 1990's.

== Rank structure ==
Promotion to the ranks of sergeant, lieutenant, and captain are made via competitive civil service examinations. Promotion to the ranks of detective, detective sergeant, detective lieutenant, detective captain, deputy inspector, inspector and chief are made at the discretion of the police commissioner, though an individual must already have attained the rank of sergeant, lieutenant or captain prior to being designated detective in that grade.

Title	Insignia
Police Commissioner	
Chief of Department	
Chief of Division	
Assistant Chief	
Deputy Chief	
Inspector	
Deputy Inspector	
Captain/Detective Captain	
Lieutenant/Detective Lieutenant	
Sergeant/Detective Sergeant	
Police Officer/Detective	No Insignia

== Specialized units ==
Along with the services it provided at the beginning, the police department now also provides specialized services, similar to those usually found in the police departments of large cities:

=== Aviation ===

The Aviation Section is equipped with four helicopters, providing law enforcement, search and rescue, and medevac service to the entire county: two twin-engine Eurocopter EC 145 and two single-engine Eurocopter AS-350B2 patrol helicopters. The SCPD was the first program in the country to operate the EC145. The aircraft is large enough and powerful enough to accommodate all of the LE, EMS and SAR mission equipment at once. The SCPD's AS350 B2s primarily operate in the department's law enforcement missions, but due to the aircraft's cabin-size and flexibility, they are also able to fulfill EMS missions in a backup role. The Aviation Section maintains a base 24 hours per day at Long Island MacArthur Airport in Ronkonkoma and 16 hours per day at Gabreski Airport in Westhampton Beach.

=== Arson ===
Arson Squad detectives investigate suspicious fires, bombings, and WMD threats.

=== Highway Patrol ===
The Highway Patrol Bureau, which features marked and unmarked patrol cars as well as motorcycles, patrols the Long Island Expressway and Sunrise Highway within the police district. In addition to speed enforcement, it enforces drunk driving laws, motor carrier regulations governing large trucks and buses, and investigates all auto-related fatalities in the police district, regardless of whether or not they occurred on the highway.

The Highway Patrol Bureau was removed from Sunrise Highway and the Long Island Expressway by County Executive Steve Levy on September 15, 2008, and its members transferred to other commands. Levy justified the move on the grounds that the New York State Police ought to be primarily responsible for patrolling state highways. In the absence of more state troopers, highway patrol functions were transferred to the Suffolk County Sheriff's Office.

On August 4, 2012, a new police contract restored responsibility for patrolling the LIE and Sunrise Highway to the SCPD. On November 20, 2012, the Highway Patrol Bureau resumed patrolling and answering all 911 calls for service on the Long Island Expressway and Sunrise Highway.

=== Emergency Service Section ===

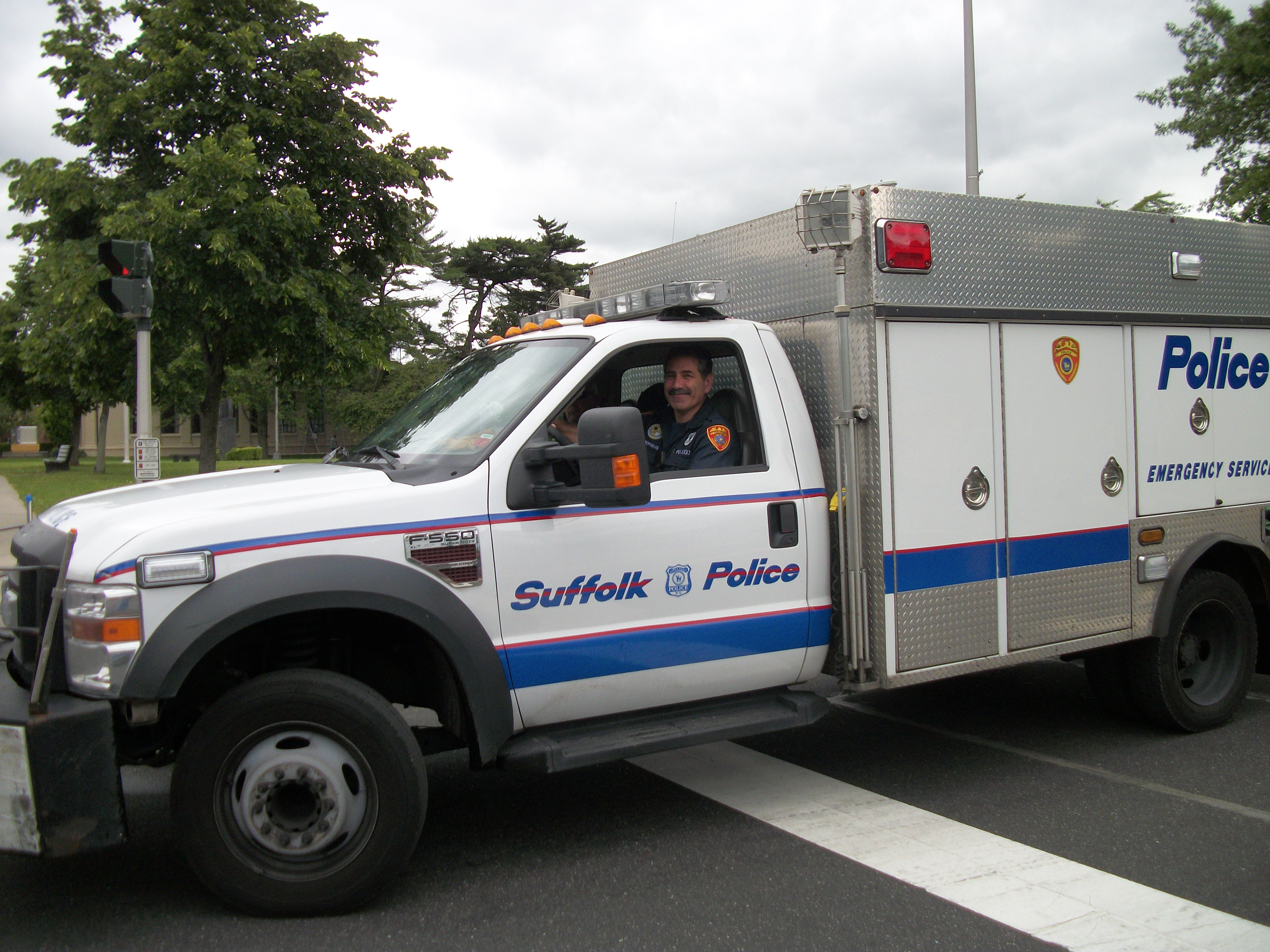
A Ford F-550 Suffolk County Police ESS Truck.

On October 1, 1973, the Emergency Service (ES) Section of the Suffolk County Police Department was formed. The unit is composed of highly trained officers using specialized equipment in a variety of vehicles. The Emergency Service Section primarily handles Explosives, Haz-Mat, S.W.A.T., and Rescue calls.

=== Airport Operations Section ===
After September 11, 2001, the department established an Airport Operations Section to enhance security at Long Island MacArthur Airport in Ronkonkoma. These officers work alongside the Town of Islip's Long Island MacArthur Airport Police Department to protect and secure the airport, staff and passengers.

=== Community Oriented Police Enforcement (COPE) ===
Each of the seven patrol precincts includes a Community Oriented Police Enforcement (COPE) section, which includes a Mountain Bike Unit.

=== Marine Bureau ===
The Suffolk Police Marine Bureau patrols the 500 square miles (1,000 km^{2}) of navigable waterways within the police district, from the Connecticut and Rhode Island state line which bisects the Long Island Sound, to the New York state line 3 miles (5 km) south of Fire Island in the Atlantic Ocean. The Bureau is also responsible for patrol of the barrier beach communities of Fire Island, including EMS services in the eastern communities. The Bureau operates 27' and 31' twin outboard SAFE Boats, which are also certified for patient transport, as well as 40' twin diesel Thomas Marine patrol boats, as well as a variety of other craft for special missions and flood water rescue. On the barrier beach, the Bureau operates four-wheel drive SUVs, pickups, ATVs and John Deere Gators for patrol and medical response.

=== Auxiliary Police ===

The Auxiliary Police is a volunteer police force in the Suffolk County Police Department. Auxiliary officers are civic-minded men and women who volunteer to help their community and the Suffolk County Police Department by performing uniformed patrols throughout Suffolk County to help deter crime. Up until 2010 Auxiliary officers had to go through a 40-hour training course, but due to changes in state legislation, are now required to go through a full 120-hour Peace Officer training program, and are recognized by NY State as full-time Peace Officers. Auxiliary officers, are uniformed, and are equipped with batons, handcuffs, and pepper spray. Auxiliary officers who want to carry a firearm on patrol must go through extra training in order to do so. Auxiliary officers patrol on foot and in fully marked patrol cars. Auxiliary officers have always had no power beyond a citizen while on duty, although with the new "Peace Officer" designation, that has changed. Even though they hold Peace Officer status, SCPD rules do limit their authority while on duty and a full-time Police Officer is usually called to assist Auxiliaries with police related actions like arrests.

== See also ==
- Janetka v. Dabe
- List of law enforcement agencies in New York
- List of law enforcement agencies on Long Island
- Suffolk County Sheriff's Office
- Park police
