= James Burke (police officer) =

American police chief

James Charles Burke (born Queens, 1965) -- known as Jimmy Burke -- is a former New York law enforcement officer and ex-convict. He served as Suffolk County’s highest ranking police official from 2012 until 2015 when he was arrested, indicted and convicted on federal charges including obstruction of justice and violating civil rights.

== Career ==
Burke was an officer of the New York City Police Department in the 1980s. He later worked for the Suffolk County Police Department in Suffolk County, New York. In 1995, a Suffolk County Police Department internal probe found that Burke had "had a relationship with a woman engaged in prostitution and drug dealing, and had engaged in sex acts in police vehicles while on duty and in uniform".

Burke was appointed chief of the Suffolk County Police Department by Suffolk County Executive Steve Bellone in 2012 and served in that capacity until 2015. During his tenure as chief, Burke supervised the investigation of the Gilgo Beach serial killings. Burke's work on the Gilgo Beach case, "including a decision to end cooperation with the FBI", drew criticism from other law enforcement officials.

== Legal issues ==
In May 2013, the FBI and the US Attorney's Office opened an investigation into Burke's alleged beating of a suspect in police custody, a subsequent cover-up, and coercion of witnesses. Burke was charged with assaulting Christopher Loeb after Loeb was arrested for allegedly breaking into Burke's unlocked vehicle and stealing a "gun belt, ammunition, a box of cigars and a bag containing sex toys and pornography". Burke was arrested at his home in St. James, New York in December 2013.

Burke pleaded guilty to reduced charges in February 2016, as per a plea bargain offered by United States District Court for the Eastern District of New York prosecutor Lara Gatz and co-counsel John Durham. Following Burke's guilty plea, Suffolk County Executive Steve Bellone commented, "'Jim Burke, someone I entrusted with great responsibility, lied to my face for nearly three years and orchestrated a cover-up to perpetuate that lie'". In November 2016, Burke was sentenced to 46 months in federal prison for assault and obstruction of justice. In January 2017, Burke began serving his sentence at Federal Correctional Institution, Allenwood Low. He was released to house arrest in November 2018. His sentence was completed in April 2019.

On August 22, 2023, Burke was arrested for indecent exposure, public lewdness, offering a sex act, and unlawful solicitation after allegedly exposing himself to a male plainclothes park ranger at Vietnam Veterans Memorial Park in Farmingville and propositioning him. On August 31, 2023, the latter two charges were dropped.

On April 29, 2026, prosecutors said they could not meet their burden at trial and asked for an adjournment that would see the case dismissed in roughly six months due to the fact that three park police officers tied to the arrest resigned or were discharged, including the officer alleged to have observed the conduct. If Burke avoids new legal trouble during the adjournment period, the case is expected to be dismissed.

== See also ==
- Gilgo Beach serial killings, investigated by Burke
