= North Sea, New York =

- Hamlet and census-designated place
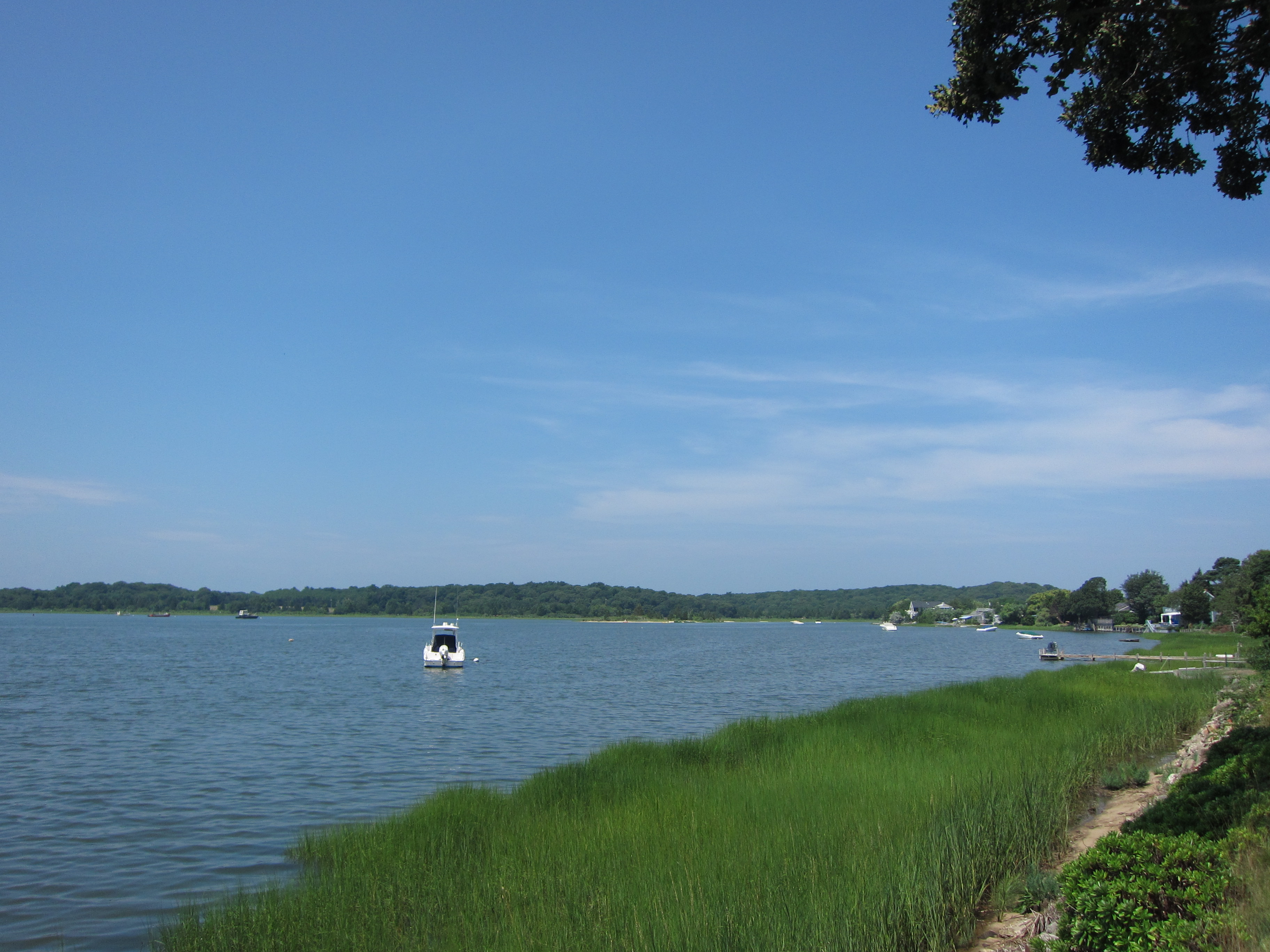
- The harbor of North Sea, New York.

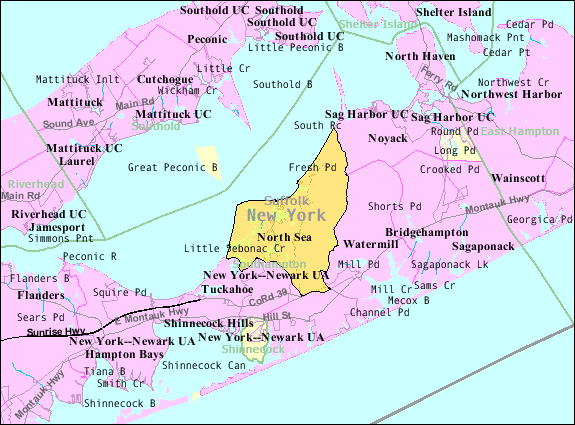
- U.S. Census map of North Sea.

- Location within the state of New York
- Coordinates: 40°56′26″N 72°24′11″W
- Country: United States
- State: New York
- County: Suffolk
- Town: Southampton

Area
  - Total: 12.10 sq mi (31.33 km^{2})
  - Land: 11.05 sq mi (28.63 km^{2})
  - Water: 1.04 sq mi (2.70 km^{2})
- Elevation: 16 ft (5 m)

Population (2020)
  - Total: 5,461
  - Density: 494.0/sq mi (190.74/km^{2})
- Time zone: UTC-5 (Eastern (EST))
  - Summer (DST): UTC-4 (EDT)
- ZIP code: 11968
- Area code: 631
- FIPS code: 36-53561
- GNIS feature ID: 0958911

North Sea is a hamlet and census-designated place (CDP) in the Town of Southampton in Suffolk County, on the South Fork of Long Island, in New York, United States. As of the 2020 census, North Sea had a population of 5,461.

It is served by the North Sea Fire District, which operates in adjacent areas as well.

== Geography ==
According to the United States Census Bureau, North Sea has a total area of 12.1 square miles (31.3 km^{2}), of which 11.0 square miles (28.6 km^{2}) is land and 1.0 square mile (2.7 km^{2}), or 8.61%, is water.

Historical population
Census	Pop.	Note	%±
2020	5,461		—
U.S. Decennial Census

== Demographics ==
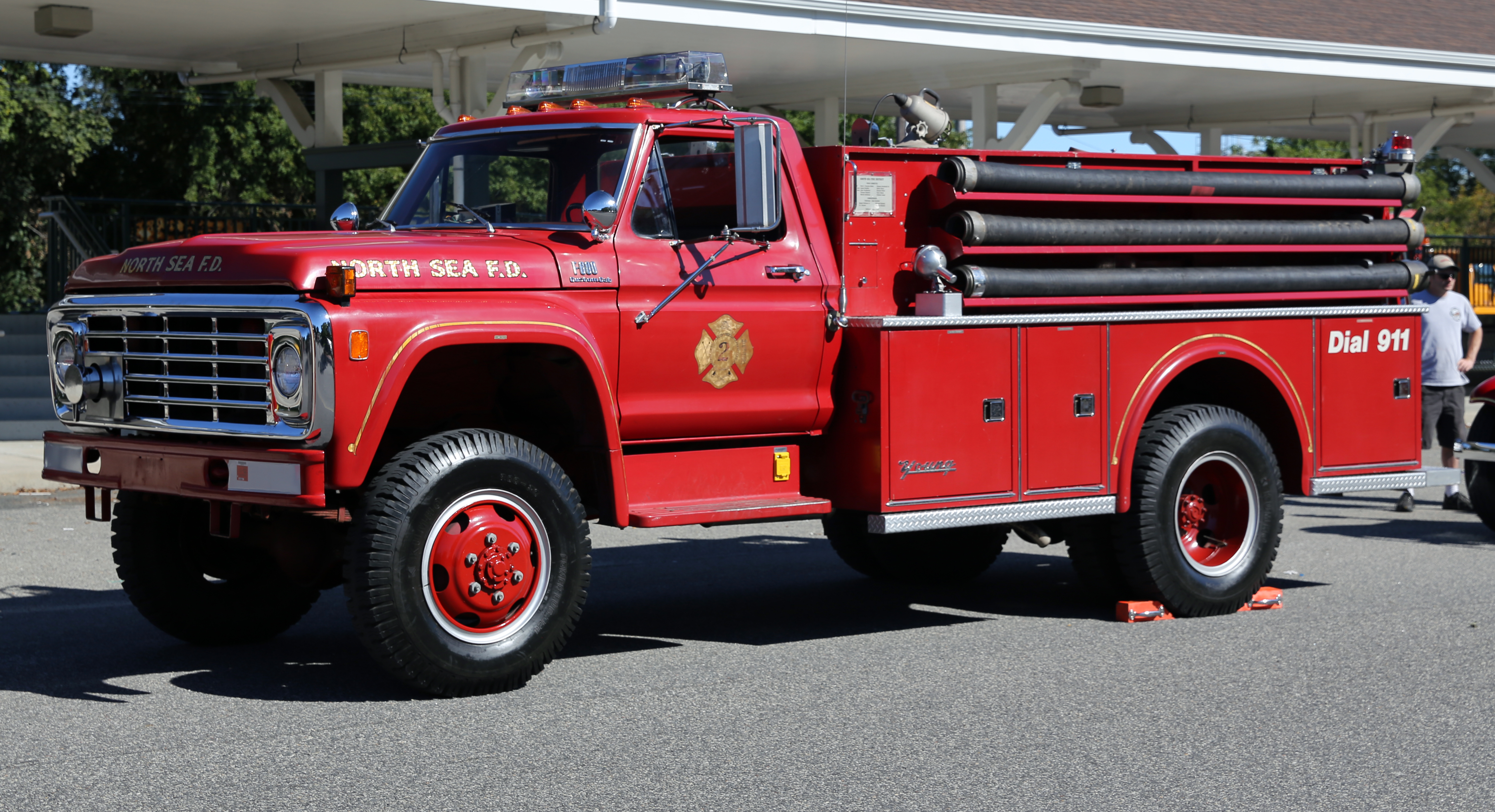
A Ford fire engine of the North Sea Fire Department in a parade at the Southampton LIRR station.

As of the census of 2000, there were 4,493 people, 1,880 households, and 1,210 families residing in the CDP. The population density was 364.9 inhabitants per square mile (140.9/km^{2}). There were 3,265 housing units at an average density of 265.2 per square mile (102.4/km^{2}). The racial makeup of the CDP was 94.70% White, 1.40% African American, 0.18% Native American, 0.96% Asian, 0.22% Pacific Islander, 1.65% from other races, and 0.89% from two or more races. Hispanic or Latino of any race were 5.30% of the population.

There were 1,880 households, out of which 26.3% had children under the age of 18 living with them, 52.4% were married couples living together, 8.7% had a female householder with no husband present, and 35.6% were non-families. 28.2% of all households were made up of individuals, and 10.0% had someone living alone who was 65 years of age or older. The average household size was 2.39 and the average family size was 2.92.

In the CDP, the population was spread out, with 20.5% under the age of 18, 5.3% from 18 to 24, 28.4% from 25 to 44, 30.0% from 45 to 64, and 15.8% who were 65 years of age or older. The median age was 43 years. For every 100 females, there were 96.6 males. For every 100 females age 18 and over, there were 94.9 males.

The median income for a household in the CDP was $62,684, and the median income for a family was $71,168. Males had a median income of $53,879 versus $38,219 for females. The per capita income for the CDP was $34,668. About 4.5% of families and 7.2% of the population were below the poverty line, including 11.3% of those under age 18 and 7.7% of those age 65 or over.
