= Murder in New York law =

Aspect of New York criminal law

Murder in New York law constitutes the unlawful killing, under circumstances defined by law, of people within or under the jurisdiction of the U.S. state of New York. Because the criminal law of the state also governs the City of New York, there is not a separate law applicable to murders committed in the city.

The United States Centers for Disease Control and Prevention reported that in the year 2021, the state had a murder rate somewhat below the median for the entire country.

== Definitions ==
=== First-degree murder ===
First-degree murder or aggravated murder is the most serious homicide offense in New York state. It is defined as the intentional killing of a person without justification with one of the following aggravating factors:

- The victim was a police officer, peace officer, correctional employee, judge, or a criminal case witness
- The murder was committed while the perpetrator was serving a life sentence
- The murder was committed with torture of the victim
- The murder was committed as an act of terrorism, as defined in the Anti-Terrorism Act of 2001
- The murder was committed during the commission or attempted commission of one of the felonies under New York's felony murder laws.
- Murder committed for hire (with the charge applying to both the murderer and the person who paid the murderer)

A defendant under the age of 18 cannot be charged with first-degree murder. First-degree murder is punishable by 20 to 40 years in prison, or life imprisonment without the possibility of parole. The death penalty was ruled unconstitutional in New York under People v. LaValle in 2004.

=== Second-degree murder ===
Second-degree murder is the second most serious homicide offense in New York. It is defined as when someone commits an intentional killing without a felony under New York's felony murder rule, or an unintentional killing which either exhibits a "depraved indifference to human life" or an unintentional killing caused by the commission or attempted commission of a felony under New York's felony murder rule.

Second-degree murder is punishable by a minimum of 15 years in prison to a maximum of life in prison with the possibility of parole after 25 years. However, if the victim was under the age of 14, the maximum sentence is life in prison without the possibility of parole.

=== Felony murder rule ===
In the state of New York, the common law felony murder rule has been codified in New York Penal Law § 125.25. The New York version of the rule provides that a death occurring during the commission of certain felonies, without the intent to kill, becomes second degree murder, and with intent to kill, becomes first degree murder.

==== Felonies that warrant the felony murder rule ====
A defendant can be charged with second-degree murder when they committed or attempted to commit one of the following felonies, regardless of intent to kill, causing someone's death, and they can be charged with first-degree murder when the defendant had intent to kill:

- Robbery
- Burglary
- Kidnapping
- Arson
- First-degree rape
- First-degree criminal sexual act
- First-degree sexual abuse
- Aggravated sexual abuse
- First-degree escape
- Second-degree escape

==== Affirmative defenses ====
The rule also provides an affirmative defense. The defendant has an affirmative defense if the crime was committed in a group and they:

- Did not actually commit, solicit, or aid the homicide
- Were not armed with a deadly weapon
- Had no reason to believe that another participant carried a deadly weapon
- Had no reason to believe that another participant intended to engage in conduct likely to cause death or serious bodily injury

== Penalties ==
The sentences for homicide offenses in New York are listed below.

Offense	Mandatory sentence
Criminally negligent homicide	1 to 5 years in prison
Second-degree vehicular manslaughter	2 to 7 years in prison
Aggravated criminally negligent homicide	3 1/2 to 15 years in prison
First-degree vehicular manslaughter	3 1/2 to 15 years in prison
Second-degree manslaughter	3 1/2 to 15 years in prison
Aggravated vehicular manslaughter	5 to 25 years in prison
First-degree manslaughter	5 to 25 years in prison
Second-degree murder	15 years to life Imprisonment
First-degree murder	Life imprisonment; Or; 20 to 40 years in prison
